= Pedlar (fur trade) =

Fur traders in colonial North America

Pedlar is a term used in Canadian history to refer to English-speaking independent fur traders from Montreal who competed with the Hudson's Bay Company in western Canada from about 1770 to 1803. After 1779 they were mostly absorbed by the North West Company. The name was first used by the Hudson's Bay Company to refer to French coureurs des bois, who travelled inland to trade with the Indians in their villages and camps. This was in contrast to the HBC policy of building posts on Hudson Bay, to where the Indians would bring furs to trade with them.

The pedlars were important for three reasons: they helped transfer woodland skills from French-Canadians to the English-speakers who dominated the trade in the nineteenth century. Although English and Scots men had the capital to become traders for the HBC, most of the voyageurs, guides, and interpreters were French-Canadian or Métis people. They helped transfer knowledge of the country from the Indigenous peoples. Second, the pedlar competition forced the HBC to build posts inland. After 1821, the HBC monopoly became an informal government for western Canada. It is credited with contributing to the confederation of western and eastern Canada. Third, the pedlars opened up much of the country west of Lake Winnipeg. By the time the Canadian trade approached the Rocky Mountains, most pedlars had been absorbed into the North West Company.

== Arrivals ==
The first dates some of the major English-speaking fur traders arrived in Canada are as follows, concentrated near the ends of the two wars.

- 1759: Quebec falls, William Grant (seigneur, Scotland)
- 1760: Montreal falls, Richard Dobie (Scotland), George McBeath (Scotland)
- 1761: Alexander Henry the elder (New Jersey)
- 1763: Benjamin Frobisher and Joseph Frobisher (England)
- 1765: Peter Pond (Connecticut)
- 1766: James McGill (Scotland)
- 1767: Peter Pangman (New Jersey)
- 1769: Simon McTavish (Scotland)
- 1774: Nicholas Montour (New York), John Finlay (fur trader, Canada)
- 1783: Angus Bethune (fur trader, Canada)
- 1783?: Alexander MacKay (fur trader, New York)
- 1784: Simon Fraser (explorer, New York), David Thompson (explorer, London), William McGillivray (Scotland)
- 1785: Francis Badgley (merchant, London)
- 1786: Angus Shaw (Scotland)
- 1788: Peter Fidler (explorer, England)
- 1790: Peter Skene Ogden (Quebec)
- 1799: Daniel Williams Harmon (Vermont)

== Re-establishment of the fur trade and westward expansion ==
=== French trade destroyed ===
During the French and Indian War, French officers were withdrawn to Quebec, trade goods became scarce, and by 1760 all the French forts on the Saskatchewan were closed. Some French colonists remained in the upper country and carried on trade as best they could. Some, like Louis Primeau gave up and joined the Hudson's Bay Company. After the British conquest of New France, the Royal Proclamation of 1763 attempted to regulate the fur trade, but there was no practical way to control the western traders. In 1768 control of Indian trade was shifted to the individual colonies and thus to the Governor of Quebec.

=== Trade re-established ===
Montreal fell in 1760. In 1761 William Grant made a deal with a French-Canadian to carry goods to Michilimackinac. In the same year Alexander Henry the elder carried goods from Albany, New York to Michilimackinac. In 1763 he was caught up in Pontiac's Rebellion and spent a year as a captive. In 1765 William Howard, in command of Michilimackinac, gave Henry a monopoly on the Lake Superior trade. French-Canadians who had remained in the interior, such as Blondeau and François le Blanc, continued to come and go. The first (unnamed) Englishman west of the lakes had his canoes plundered on Rainy Lake in 1765 and 1766, but he reached Lake Winnipeg in 1767. By 1767 the western trade seems to have been re-established. In that year 100 canoes traveled from Grand Portage to Michilimackinac where Robert Rogers was in charge. The returns for that year show mostly French traders backed by English capitalists, along with a few English. They were trading in such places as Fort Dauphin, Manitoba, and Fort La Reine. In 1768 James Finlay was at Nipawin, Saskatchewan, and in 1770 B&T Frobisher were on Cedar Lake.

=== West up the Saskatchewan ===
In 1773/74 Louis Primeau and Joseph Frobisher wintered on Cumberland Lake. In 1774 Samuel Hearne built Cumberland House, Saskatchewan, the "first" interior post of the Hudson's Bay Company. In 1775 there were a number of pedlars upriver on the lower Saskatchewan near the old Fort de la Corne. Some appeared on Cumberland Lake, including Peter Pangman, the Frobishers, and Alexander Henry the elder. In 1776 the pedlars built Fort Sturgeon, the first post on the North Saskatchewan. In 1778 the pedlars built a post called Middle Settlement, upriver near Silver Grove (52°59′N 106°27′W). Beyond the "elbow", they had a place called "Pidgeon's House" near Ruddell, Saskatchewan, and another called "Upper Settlement", nine miles downriver from Battleford, Saskatchewan. (In 1780 an Indian was killed at the Upper Settlement by being given an overdose of laudanum. The Indians captured the fort but allowed the traders to leave.)

In 1779 the North West Company was established. Around 1780 a major smallpox epidemic struck the middle Saskatchewan and resulted in the deaths of many of the native trappers, resulting in a large economic loss for the North West Company in 1782. In 1782 the French captured York Factory, Manitoba, which disrupted the HBC trade. In 1786 Pine Island Fort was built 40 miles east of the Alberta border. One of its founders was Donald McKay, who was still a "pedlar" independent of the North West Company. For subsequent history see Saskatchewan River fur trade.

=== Northwest to Lake Athabasca ===
In the spring of 1775 Primeau and Joseph Frobisher went north from Cumberland Lake to Frog Portage, where they intercepted a large number of furs destined for Hudson Bay. In the winter of 1776/77, Peter Pond and Thomas Frobisher were on Lac Île-à-la-Crosse. In 1778 Pond crossed the Methye Portage and wintered about 40 miles below Lake Athabasca. In 1781 the HBC decided to enter the Athabasca trade.

== See also ==
- Athabasca Country
