= Red River cart =

Two-wheeled cart

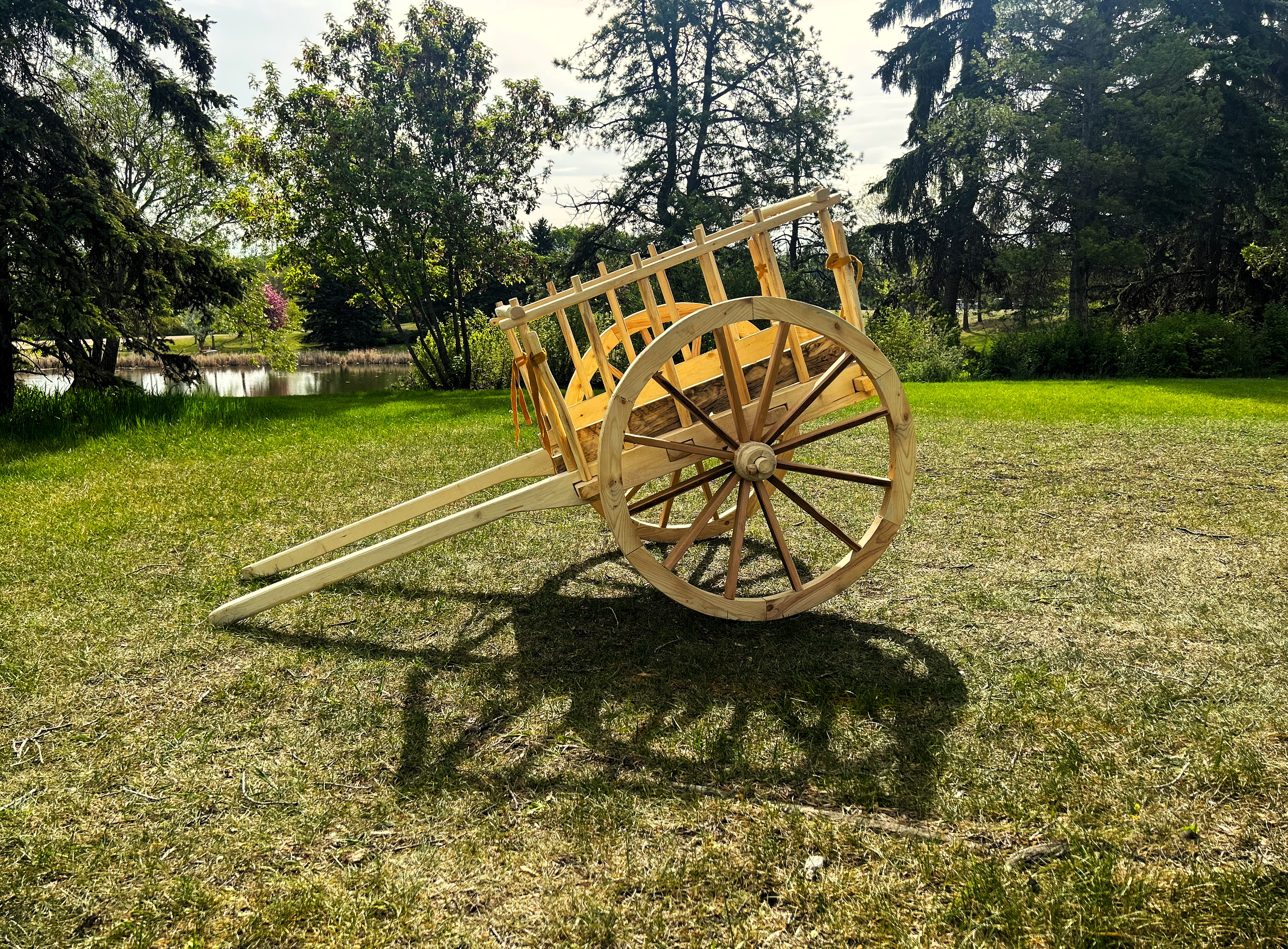
A Red River cart (2025)

The Red River cart is a large two-wheeled cart made entirely of non-metallic materials. Often drawn by oxen, though also by horses or mules, these carts were used throughout most of the 19th century in the fur trade and in westward expansion in Canada and the United States, in the area of the Red River and on the plains west of the Red River Colony. The cart is a simple conveyance developed by Métis for use in their settlement on the Red River in what later became Manitoba. With carts, the Metis were not restricted to river travel to hunt bison. The Red River cart was largely responsible for commercializing the buffalo hunt.

== Description ==
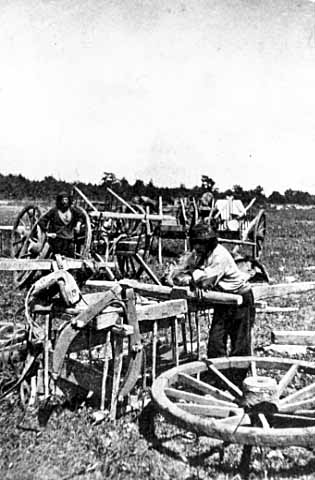
Red River cart being repaired (1856)

According to the journal of North West Company fur-trader Alexander Henry the younger, the carts made their first appearance in 1801 at Fort Pembina, just south of what is now the Canada–United States border. Derived either from the two-wheeled charettes used in French Canada or from Scottish carts, it was adapted to use only local materials.

Because nails were unavailable or very expensive in the early West, these carts contain no iron at all, being entirely constructed of wood and animal hide. The cart can be dismantled, the wheels covered with bison hides to make floats and the box placed on top. Thus the cart can be floated across streams. Red River carts are strong enough to carry loads as heavy as 1,000 pounds (450 kg). A pair of oak shafts, 12-foot-long (3.7 m), also form the frame of the cart. Crosspieces hold the floorboards, and front, side and rear boards or rails made of willows or dimensional lumber enclose the box. These wooden pieces are joined by mortices and tenons. The axle is made of seasoned oak, lashed to the cart with strips of bison hide or shaganappi, (Note: Shaganappi means a thin-narrow cord for lacing made with bison hide.) that are attached when wet, but shrink and tighten as they dry. The axles connect two spoked wheels, 5 to 6 feet (1.5–1.8 m) in diameter, which are "dished", in the form of a shallow cone, for extra stability.

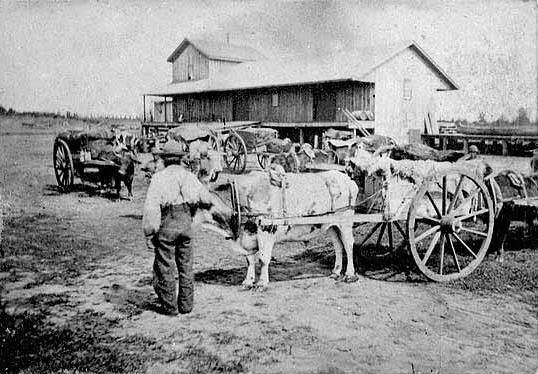
Red River ox cart at a railway station (1860s)

Motive power for the carts was originally supplied by small horses obtained from the First Nations. After cattle were brought to the Selkirk Settlement in the 1820s, oxen were used, preferred because of their strength, endurance, and cloven hooves, which spread their weight in swampy areas. The cart, constructed of native materials, can easily be repaired. A supply of shaganappi and wood are brought along, because a cart can break a half-dozen axles during a one-way trip. The axles are ungreased, as grease will capture dust, which acts as sandpaper and can immobilize the cart. The resultant squeal sounds like an untuned violin, giving it the sobriquet "the North West fiddle"; one visitor wrote that "a den of wild beasts cannot be compared with its hideousness."

== Uses ==
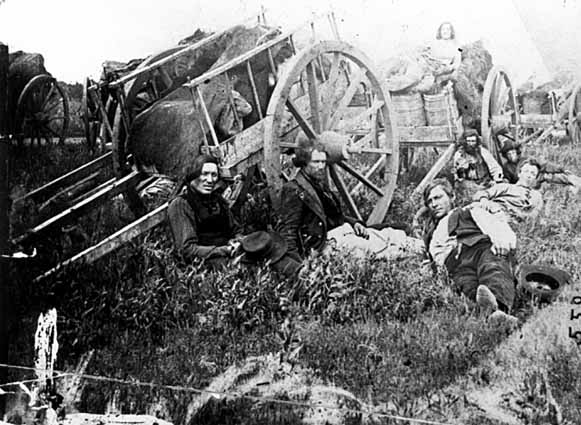
Métis trade caravan (1860)

The Red River Trails on which the carts were used extended from the Red River Colony via fur-trading posts, such as Pembina and St. Joseph in the Red River Valley, to Mendota and St. Paul, Minnesota. Furs were the usual cargo on the trip to St. Paul, and trade goods and supplies were carried on the trip back to the colony.

The Carlton Trail was also an important route for the carts, running from the Red River Colony west to Fort Carlton and Fort Edmonton in present-day Saskatchewan and Alberta, with branches such as the Fort à la Corne Trail. The carts were the primary conveyance in the Canadian West from early settlement until the coming of the Canadian Pacific Railway toward the end of the century. Carts could not be used west of Fort Edmonton because there were no roads or trails passable by wheeled vehicles over the Rocky Mountains.

The Hudson's Bay Company would use Red River carts as their main commercial cart in the 1860s. This was due to an increased success of the Minnesota cart route instead of the York Factory boat route.

Invented and developed by the Métis and Countryborn peoples the Red River cart became a symbol of their heritage rooted in mobility and social networks.

== Surviving examples, models and replicas ==
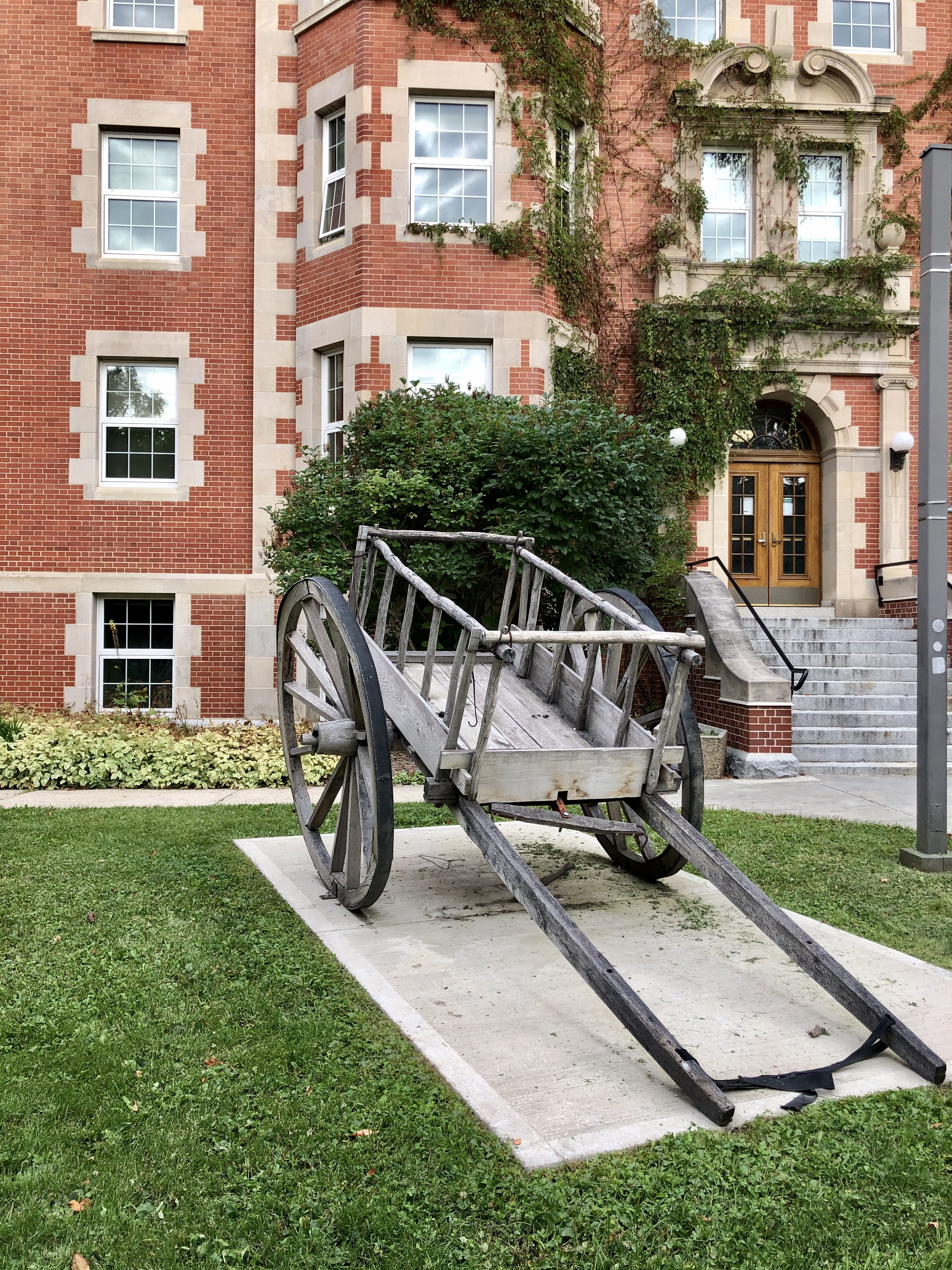
Red River cart replica in front of Pembina Hall at the University of Alberta

The National Museum of American History displays a Red River cart collected in the 1850s in its American Enterprise exhibition. Models may be found at St. Louis, Duck Lake and Prince Albert, Saskatchewan, and Selkirk, Manitoba. The Clay County Historical Society in Minnesota and Fort Vancouver National Historic Site in Vancouver, Washington, each have a full-scale replica cart. Fort Nisqually Living History Museum in Washington State has a half-scale replica.

Fort Snelling, a historic site near Saint Paul, Minnesota, operated by the Minnesota Historical Society, has a full-sized replica. The fort was an important early stop for traffic on what would become the Red River Trail.

The Remington Carriage Museum, Cardston, Alberta, and the Royal Alberta Museum, Edmonton, Alberta, also have full-size replicas of a Red River cart, as does Bent's Old Fort National Historic Site in La Junta, Colorado.

The Faculty of Native Studies at the University of Alberta displays a full-size replica of a Red River cart in front of their home in Pembina Hall. It was donated to the faculty by the Métis Nation of Alberta in November 2015. The Métis also donated an example to the Juno Beach Centre in France to commemorate their participation in the invasion of Normandy in 1944 and the liberation of Europe.

== See also ==
- Bullock cart – Vehicle pulled by oxen
- Oxbow – U-shaped ox collar for pulling loads
- York boat – Large, wide, all-wood cargo boat used in Canada
