= Asleep by the frozen sea =

Hudson's Bay Company policy

Asleep by the frozen sea is a phrase coined by Joseph Robson to describe the policy of the Hudson's Bay Company (HBC) from its foundation in 1670 until the establishment of its first inland post in 1774. Unlike the French who sent Coureurs des bois inland to trade, the HBC built posts on Hudson Bay and waited for the Indigenous inhabitants to bring furs to them. The decision to abandon this policy and move inland gradually turned the HBC into an informal government for western Canada and led ultimately to the confederation of western and eastern Canada.

The Robson quote seems to be "The Company have for eighty years slept at the edge of a frozen sea.... They have shewn no curiosity to penetrate farther themselves, and have exerted all their art and power to crush that spirit in others." In 1752 Joseph Robson: published "An Account of Six Years Residence in Hudson's-Bay". He worked as a stonemason on Prince of Wales Fort from 1733 to 1735 and returned to the Bay in 1744 as surveyor and Superintendent of Buildings. In 1747 he returned to England and became involved with Arthur Dobbs and his attack on the HBC.

The HBC did send some explorers inland. In 1690-92 Henry Kelsey reached the Saskatchewan River, but this was not followed up. In 1715 James Knight hearing reports of copper to the northwest sent William Stuart inland to somewhere southeast of the Great Slave Lake. In 1717 and 1721 Richard Norton went inland from Churchill. In 1754-55 Anthony Henday took Kelsey's route, passed some French forts and reached Alberta. In 1769 and 1770 Samuel Hearne travelled to the barren grounds northwest of Churchill. In 1771 he reached the Arctic Ocean at the mouth of the Coppermine River.

The HBC established six posts on Hudson Bay: on James Bay: Rupert House (1668, southeast), Moose Factory (1673, south) and Fort Albany (1679, west); and on the western shore of Hudson Bay proper: Fort Severn (1689), York Factory (1684) and Fort Churchill (1717). The French made a number of attempts to capture them (see Anglo-French conflicts on Hudson Bay). The three James Bay posts competed directly with the French to the south, while the two westernmost posts had a near monopoly. After 1731 the French pushed west from Lake Superior threatening the western monopoly and diverting part of the western trade to Montreal.

From 1731 La Vérendrye pushed French trade west from Lake Superior to beyond Lake Winnipeg, thereby diverting part of the western trade to Montreal. Morton found no reduction in the HBC trade before 1750 but claimed that the French were taking a larger share of a growing trade. About this time Arthur Dobbs began agitating to have the HBC move inland and find the northwest passage. By around 1740 the western posts were in contact with "French Indians" who traded with the French near Lake Winnipeg. In 1743 the HBC built its first inland post at Henley House west of James Bay. This was not a proper fur trading post but rather a kind of general store that made it easier for the western First Nations to reach James Bay.

The problem for the HBC was that they had always been coastal traders, their men had no woodland experience and the western Bay had no large birch trees to make proper canoes. English goods were usually cheaper than those of the French, but buying from inland traders saved the Native Americans weeks of travel. Two of the most important advocates of inland expansion were James Isham and later Andrew Graham. In 1743 Isham wrote to London advocating inland posts. In 1754 Anthony Henday went to Alberta. In 1756-64 Isham sent Joseph Smith on 5 journeys to the Swan River country. In 1758 Isham sent Isaac Batt inland from York Factory. Next year Batt returned leading 64 canoes of Native Americans. In 1760 the British capture of Montreal gave the HBC a brief monopoly. Frenchmen like Louis Primeau joined the HBC, and were important in transferring woodland skills to the company. For the period 1763-74 Morton counts 44 HBC journeys into the interior. Most of these travelled with so-called 'Leaders', that is, Indigenous men who were accustomed to lead large groups of canoes down to the Bay trading posts. Before 1764 Isbester and John Patterson deserted the company, somehow got trade goods and were trading in the interior. In 1766 Andrew Graham sent 6 parties inland. By 1768 Isaac Batt was travelling inland yearly. In 1768 Ferdinand Jacobs proposed a fort at the mouth of the Saskatchewan. This was approved by London but not acted upon. In 1767 and 1769 Graham sent William Tomison to the Saskatchewan where he reported many Montreal traders. By 1770 or a few years before the Montreal trade had been re-established by English-speaking "Pedlars" who were more aggressive than the French. In 1772 Isaac Batt and Louis Primeau were leading 160 canoes to the Bay when the Pedlars diverted 125 of them to their house on Cedar Lake. In 1772 John Cole deserted the "Pedlars" and advocated to Andrew Graham the construction of inland posts. In August 1772 Graham sent a memorandum to London advocating an inland post near The Pas. In the same year he sent Mathew Cocking inland to the South Saskatchewan. The London Committee approved inland posts on May 18, 1773. In 1774 Samuel Hearne established Cumberland House.

In 1773 Joseph Hansom went south from Fort Churchill, one of the few to leave from that northern post. In 1774 Pedlars at Frog Portage diverted a large quantity of furs destined for Churchill.

By about 1779 the Pedlars had merged themselves into the North West Company. The two companies competed until 1821. See, for example, Saskatchewan River fur trade and Assiniboine River fur trade. After the merger of the two companies the HBC dominated western Canada until its land claims were transferred to the new Canadian confederation in 1870.

== Bibliography ==
- Morton, Arthur Silver (n.d.). A history of the Canadian West to 1870-71. T. Nelson & Sons.
- Newman, Peter Charles (2000). Empire of the Bay: The Company of Adventurers that Seized a Continent. Penguin Books. ISBN 978-0-14-029987-8.
