= List of fur trading post and forts in North America =

By the early 19th century, several companies established strings of fur trading posts and forts across North America. As well, the North-West Mounted Police established local headquarters at various points such as Calgary where the HBC soon set up a store.

== Canada ==
=== Alberta ===
- Fort Assiniboine
- Beaver Lake Cree Nation
- Buckingham House
- Fort Chipewyan
- Fort Dunvegan
- Fort Edmonton
- Fort Calgary
- Fort Walsh
- Fort de l'Isle
- Jasper House
- Fort McMurray
- Rocky Mountain House
- Fort Vermilion
- Fort Victoria

=== British Columbia ===
- Alexandria
- Barkerville
- Fort Babine
- Fort Berens
- Fort Chilcotin
- Fort Connelly
- Fort Fraser
- Fort Halkett
- Henry's House
- Fort Kluskus
- Kootanae House
- Fort Langley
- Lower Post
- Fort McDame
- Fort McLoughlin
- Fort Nelson
- Fort Resolution
- Fort St. James
- Fort St. John
- Fort Simpson
- Trout Lake Fort
- Fort Victoria
- Fort Ware
- Fort Yale

=== Manitoba ===
- Fort Alexander
- Fort Bourbon
- Brandon House
- Brunswick House First Nation
- Fort Dauphin
- Fort Douglas
- Fort Ellice
- Fort Garry
- Lower Fort Garry
- Fort Gibraltar
- Fort La Reine
- Fort Maurepas
- Fort Paskoya
- Prince of Wales Fort
- Fort Rouge
- York Factory

==== Winnipeg ====
- Fort Garry
- Fort Gibraltar
- Fort Hailey

=== Newfoundland and Labrador ===
- Eyelich Trading Post

=== Northwest Territories ===
- Aklavik
- Baillie Island
- Fort Collinson
- Fort Franklin
- Fort Good Hope
- Fort Liard
- Fort MacLeod
- Fort McKay
- Fort McPherson
- Fort Providence
- Old Fort Providence
- Fort Simpson
- Fort Smith

=== Nova Scotia ===
- Fortress of Louisbourg

=== Nunavut ===
- Amadjuak
- Baker Lake
- Bathurst Inlet
- Port Burwell
- Gjoa Haven
- Killiniq
- Padlei
- Fort Ross

=== Ontario ===
- Allanwater Bridge railway station
- Asp House
- Asubpeeschoseewagong First Nation
- Attawapiskat First Nation
- Flying Post
- Fort Albany
- Fort Frances
- Fort Frontenac
- Fort Kaministiquia
- Fort Lac la Pluie
- Fort Matachewan
- Fort Rouillé
- Fort Saint Pierre
- Fort Severn First Nation
- Fort Toronto
- Fort William, Ontario
- Frederick House Post
- Henley House
- Lake Abitibi
- Magasin Royal
- Moose Factory
- Terryberry Trading Post, Barton twp

==== Ottawa ====
- Fort D. Smith

=== Quebec ===
- Vieux-Poste
- Fort-Coulonge
- Nabisipi Trading Post
- Fort Témiscamingue
- Rupert House
- Whapmagoostui
- (Maniwaki in the Outaouais region of Quebec, Canada. HBC established fur trading post)
- (17th century fur trade building located in Lachine, Montreal, Quebec, Canada.)
- (Nipising 1874 Hudson's Bay Company trading post)
- Fort George

=== Saskatchewan ===
- Battleford
- Beauval
- Fort Carlton
- Fort de la Corne
- Cumberland House
- Fort Espérance
- Île-à-la-Crosse
- Fort Pelly
- Fort Pitt
- Fort Qu'Appelle

=== Yukon ===
- Fort Selkirk
- Teslin Post

== United States ==
=== Alabama ===
- Massacre Isle

=== Arkansas ===
- Little Rock
- Arkansas Post

=== Alaska ===
- Fort Stikine
- Fort Yukon

=== Arizona ===
- Hubbell Trading Post

=== California ===
- Fort Ross
- Yerba Buena

=== Colorado ===
- Bent's Fort on the Santa Fe Trail, near present-day La Junta, Colorado
- Fort Uncompaghre, Alta California
- Fort Vasquez

=== Connecticut ===
- Fort Huys de Goede Hoop, New Netherland

=== Idaho ===
- Fort Boise
- Fort Hall, Oregon Country
- Kullyspell House

=== Indiana ===
- Fort Vincennes

=== Michigan ===
- Fort de Buade
- Fort Detroit
- Fort Mackinac
- Fort Michilimackinac
- Fort St. Joseph
- Sault Ste. Marie

=== Minnesota ===
- Fort Duquesne
- Fort Renville
- Fort St. Charles
- Fort Snelling Northfield
- Grand Portage
- Snake River Fur Post

=== Missouri ===
- Fort Carondelet
- Fort Osage

=== Montana ===
- Saleesh House
- Fort Union - located partially in North Dakota

=== Nebraska ===
- Fort Atkinson
- Cabanne's Trading Post, Nebraska Territory
- Fontenelle's Post, Nebraska Territory
- Fort Lisa, Nebraska Territory

=== New York ===
- Fort Nassau, New Netherland (present-day Albany)
- New Amsterdam, New Netherland
- Fort Orange, New Netherland (present-day Albany)

Fort Ontario (present-day Oswego, New York)

=== North Dakota ===
- Fort Berthold
- Fort Clark
- Grand Forks
- Fort Lisa, Dakota Territory
- Fort Union - located partially in Montana

=== Oregon ===
- Fort Astoria
- Fort Umpqua, Oregon Country
- Fort William, Oregon Country

=== Pennsylvania ===
- Fort Duquesne
- Fort de la Rivière au Bœuf

=== South Dakota ===
- Hazen Mooers' Post
- Lac Traverse Post
- Lake Traverse Post
- Sieche Hollow Post
- Spencer Fur Post
- Vermillion Post

=== Utah ===
- Fort Buenaventura
- Fort Robidoux, Alta California

=== Washington ===
- Fort Vancouver, Oregon Territory
- Fort Colville
- Fort Nez Percés
- Fort Nisqually
- Fort Okanogan
- Spokane
- Spokane House

=== Wyoming ===
- Fort Bonneville
- Fort Bridger, Nebraska Territory

== See also ==
- List of Hudson's Bay Company trading posts
