= Saskatchewan River fur trade =

Historic fur trade in Western Canada

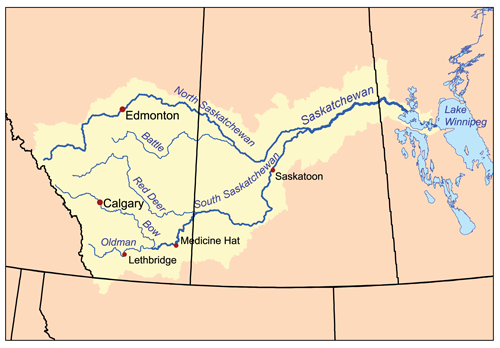
Saskatchewan River basin

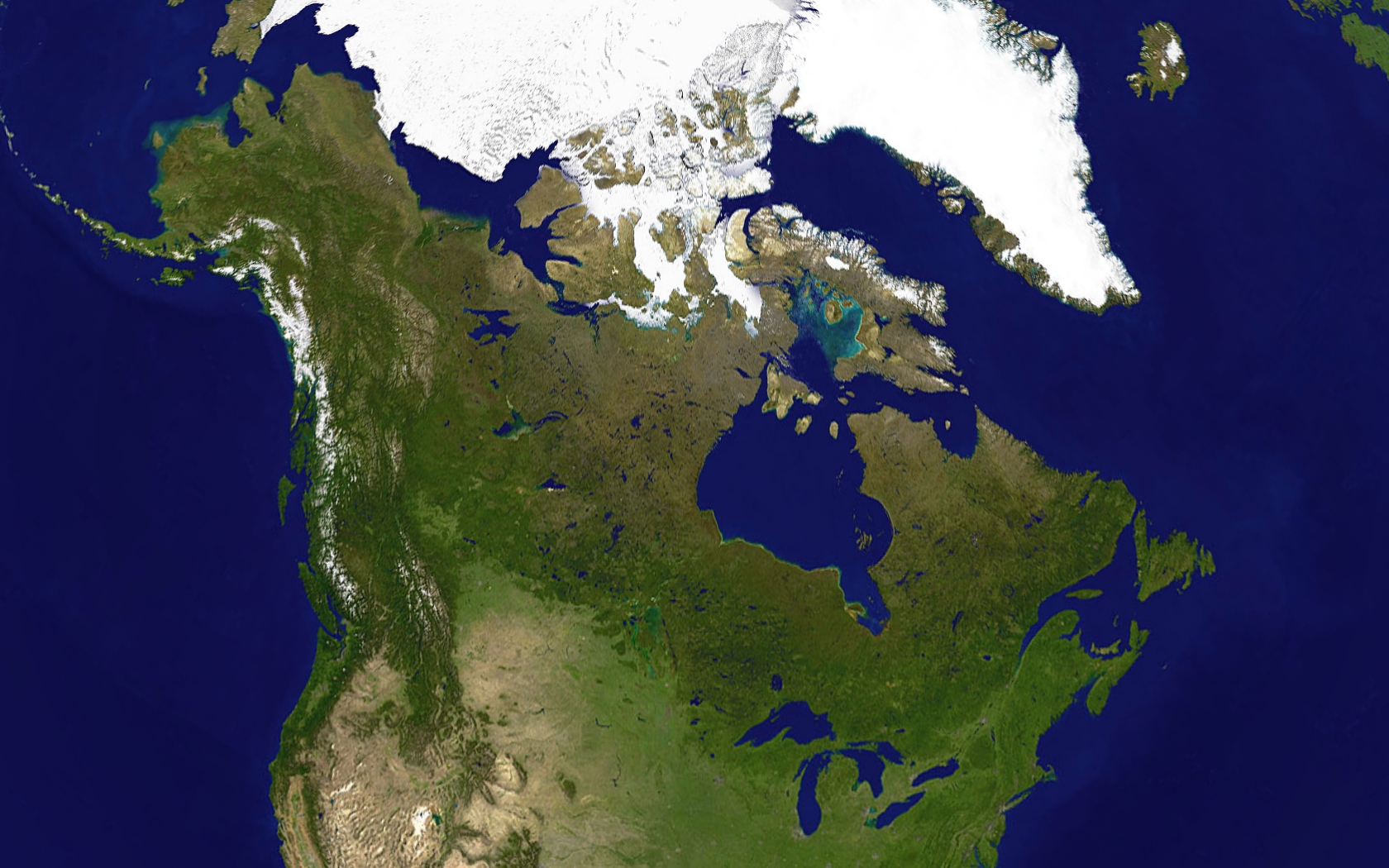
Dark green=forest, light green=prairie. Most of the Saskatchewan/North Saskatchewan flowed through the prairie just south of the forest

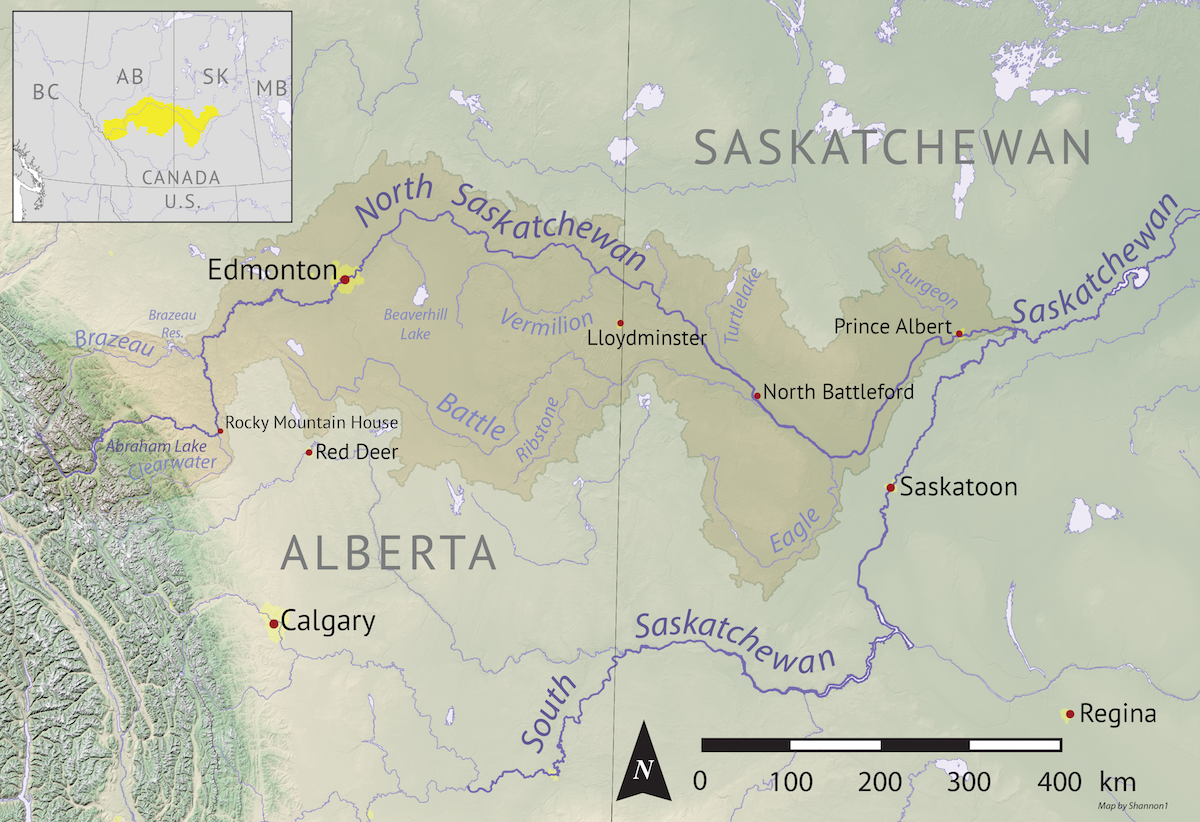
North Saskatchewan River

Saskatchewan River fur trade The Saskatchewan River was one of the two main axes of Canadian expansion west of Lake Winnipeg. The other and more important one was northwest to the Athabasca Country. For background see Canadian canoe routes (early). The main trade route followed the North Saskatchewan River and Saskatchewan River, which were just south of the forested beaver country. The South Saskatchewan River was a prairie river with few furs.

== Overview ==
The Saskatchewan River was a natural highway for furs going east and trade goods going west, to and from the Hudsons Bay. The forests north of the river provided beaver and other animal pelts. The prairies and parkland to the south provided buffalo for meat and pemmican to feed to voyageurs in the food-poor country to the north. Pemmican was often more important than beaver pelts. In 1700s most was sent downriver to Cumberland House, Saskatchewan then sent northward From 1790 some was sent overland to Green Lake, Saskatchewan and on to the Athabasca Country.

The Saskatchewan River has no significant portages between the rapids at Rocky Mountain House and its mouth at Lake Winnipeg. Eastbound canoes with that winter's catch had the advantage of the spring meltwater. Westbound trade goods in the summer and fall had to deal with low water. Poling and tracking was used on the upper river. The Hudson's Bay Company built the first proto-York boat on the river at Manchester House (located about 50 kms east of Lloydminster) in 1788, but the North West Company seems to have preferred north canoes. In the La Montee country west of Prince Albert, "bosses" would borrow horses and go buffalo hunting to feed the regular voyageurs who stayed with the canoes and rowed or paddled upstream. When speed was required, horses might be used on the trails that ran parallel to the river.

Fort Edmonton, established in the centre of today's City of Edmonton in 1812, became a hub of trails. Around 1825 a horse track was cut from Fort Assiniboine, Alberta on the Athabasca River to Edmonton. The easiest route from the Pacific was through Athabasca Pass to the Athabasca River. The transfer to the North Saskatchewan river at Edmonton meant a straighter route and the use of York boats, built at Fort Edmonton. The Athabasca River route, using the Methye portage, was indirect and required smaller north canoes for numerous portages to avoid rapids on the Athabasca River.)

From the 1870s the slaughter of buffalo, smallpox and the appearance of settlers disrupted Native life. In 1876 an ox-cart road was built from Fort Carlton north to Green Lake. In the mid-1800s, The Carlton Trail, running along the north bank of the Saskatchewan River, was gradually developed connecting Winnipeg (Red River) to Edmonton. The first steamboat on the river was the Northcote in 1874. In 1891 the Calgary & Edmonton Railway was completed to the Edmonton area. In 1905 the Canadian Northern Railway, following the route of the old Carleton Trail, reached Edmonton from Winnipeg.

The boreal forest region to the north was inhabited by Cree who had migrated northwest as middlemen in the fur trade and, in the early and middle 19th century, Saulteaux. Immediately south were the Plains Cree and Assiniboines with the Nakoda (Stoney) near the mountains. To the south were the Gens du large or Plains Indians or First Nations: Gros Ventre in Saskatchewan, Blackfeet in Alberta and Piegan Blackfeet near the Rocky Mountains. Across the mountains were Kootenays.

Since the Cree and Saulteaux had beaver-skins to trade and the First Nations on the prairies had little more than buffalo and wolf skins, the northern peoples got most of the guns. They used them to expand south. This made the plains Natives hostile to the traders since they seemed to be allies of the more northern tribes. Further, many of the voyageurs were part-Cree and knew the language. In the west the Blackfoot often hurt the fur trade. They did not trade where there were many Cree and tried to keep the Kootenays from getting guns.

Despite the antagonism of the Blackfoot and other prairie Natives, the trading posts were too well fortified to be easily attacked and were only destroyed when the traders were away. (The only exception was Fort Pitt in 1885 which by then no longer had a stockade and where its NWMP garrison had surrendered.) In the east the Gros Ventres destroyed South Branch House and Manchester House in 1793–94. Fort Sturgeon was burnt in 1780 and Rocky Mountain House in 1860. Fort Pitt and Fort Carlton were burnt during the 1885 North-West Rebellion. (Carlton was accidentally burned down as it was being evacuated in 1885.)

== Exploration and early fur trade ==
- 1691:Henry Kelsey reached the lower Saskatchewan from Hudson Bay.
- Early 1700s: Exploration and fur trade inland is conducted and controlled by French operating out of Montreal
- 1731-1743: Pierre Gaultier de Varennes, sieur de La Vérendrye pushed west from Lake Superior.
- 1739: Louis-Joseph Gaultier de La Vérendrye was somewhere on the lower Saskatchewan.
- 1741: Fort Bourbon at the mouth of the Saskatchewan and Fort Paskoya on west side of Cedar Lake.
- 1753: Fort de la Corne (AKA Fort St. Louis) about 20 miles below the Forks of the Saskatchewan.
- 1755: Anthony Henday, after possibly sighting the Rocky Mountains, returned eastwards to HBC operations at Hudson Bay, travelling down the North Saskatchewan River perhaps from near Edmonton.
- 1759: With the Conquest, the fur trade collapses. It takes the English about 15 years to restore it.
- 1768: James Findlay at Nipawin.
- 1774: HBC builds Cumberland House, Saskatchewan downstream from Fort de la Corne. (this is the "first" HBC inland post and is at the join of the Sturgeon-Weir River and the Saskatchewan River so is the gateway to Lake Athabasca, in the Mackenzie River system)
- 1774: English "Pedlars" from Montreal have trading post below the Forks of the Saskatchewan.
- 1775 Peter Pond builds trading post in the northwest corner of Lake Dauphin.
- 1776: North Saskatchewan reached at Fort Sturgeon.
- 1778 Peter Pond uses the Methye Portage for the first time.
- 1781: Cold Lake House (NWC).
- 1786: HBC's Manchester House and NWC's Pine Island Fort, about 50 kms east of Lloydminster.
- 1789: Angus Shaw of the North West Company builds a post on the northwest shore of Moose Lake (Alberta) in the Beaver River watershed. It is called Fort Lac L'Orignal or Shaw House.
- 1792: First posts in Alberta on the North Saskatchewan River - NWC's Fort George and HBC's Buckingham House, near Elk Point
- 1793: NWC's Alexander Mackenzie crosses North America, arriving on the west coast on July 22, 1793
- 1795: NWC's Augustus House and HBC'sFort Edmonton at present-day Fort Saskatchewan
- 1799: Rocky Mountain House.
- 1807: David Thompson crossed the Rocky Mountains at Howse Pass.
- 1812: James Bird and his HBC workers start to build Fort Edmonton in downtown Edmonton, starting recorded permanent occupancy of the site of today's City of Edmonton.

== Map and table ==
Most of the posts lasted less than ten years because the area became depleted of beaver and because the wooden stockades tended to rot. The major or permanent posts on the North Saskatchewan River were Cumberland House, Fort Pitt, Fort Carlton, Edmonton and Rocky Mountain House. Especially in the east there were a number of minor temporary posts that left few or no records. Until 1811, fur traders affiliated with the NWC and HBC maintained very amicable relations to the extent that the rival posts were often enclosed within the same palisades for mutual protections. After 1811, however, competition between the HBC and the NWC became increasingly intense (Blondal et al. 2008). .

Fur Trade Posts on the Saskatchewan and North Saskatchewan Rivers

Alberta

Saskatchewan

Manitoba

Red square = French foundation

In the table below locations are given by longitude and approximate straight-line distance from the post or landmark to the east. The straight-line distance from Lake Winnipeg to Howse pass is about 1,200 km or 750 miles. For Pedlars see Pedlar (fur trade). For the XY Company see North West Company#Organizational history.

longitude	distance	post	years	owner	notes
099.25W	0	Fort Bourbon#1	1741	French	mouth of the river at Lake Winnipeg
100.66W	+100 km NW	Fort Paskoya#1	1741	French	mouth of the river on Cedar Lake
101.75W	+90 km W	==Saskatchewan border			
102.30W	+35 km W	Cumberland House, Saskatchewan	1774	HBC	Depot, on Cumberland Lake, gateway to the Athabasca Country
104.02W	+130 km SW	Nipawin, Saskatchewan	1768-1795?	Pedlar	
104.80W	+55 km W	Fort de la Corne	1753	French	
???.??W	?	Fort La Jonquière	1751	French	the westernmost French fort, location unknown
105.08W	+20 km W	-- Saskatchewan River Forks			the only significant fort on the South Saskatchewan was South Branch House
105.86W	+50 km W	Fort Sturgeon	1776-1780	Pedlar	first post on the North Saskatchewan. La montee begins 40 miles west of Prince Albert
106.49W	+55 km SW	Fort Carlton	1810-1885	HBC	Depot
107.39W	+75 km SW	--southernmost point on river			
109.07W	+150 km NW	Pine Island Fort, Manchester House	1786-1793	Pedlar, NWC, HBC	
109.75W	+60 km NW	Fort Pitt (Saskatchewan)	1829-1890	HBC	Depot
110.00W	+15 km W	==Alberta border			
110.34W	+20 km W	Paint Creek House, Fort Vermillion	1802-1816	HBC, NWC	
110.76W	+35 km NW	Buckingham House, Fort George	1792-1800	HBC, NWC	
111.16W	+30 km WSW	Fort de l'Isle	1800-1808	XY, NWC, HBC	
112.23W	+80 km NW	Fort Edmonton#3, Fort Augustus#3	1810-1812	HBC, NWC	northernmost point on the river
113.17W	+70 km SW	Fort Edmonton#1, Fort Agustus#1	1795-1801	HBC, NWC	
113.50W	+33 km SW	Fort Edmonton#2,#4, Fort Augustus#2,#4	1795-1915	HBC, NWC	Depot, at Edmonton, Alberta; road north to Fort Assiniboine, Alberta
114.92W	+160 km SW	Rocky Mountain House, Alberta, Acton House	1799-1876	NWC, HBC	
116.75W	+135 km WSW	--Howse Pass	1807		over the Rocky Mountains, rarely used, the main route after 1825 was Athabasca Pass, Fort Assiniboine, Edmonton

== Sources ==
- Arthur Morton (1939), A History of the Canadian West.
- Elizabeth Browne Losey (1999). Let Them be Remembered:The Story of the Fur Trade Forts. New York: Vantage Press.
- Myrna Kostash (2005), Reading the River: A Traveller's Companion to the North Saskatchewan River.
- Blöndal, A., J.P. Foster, S. Graham, Y. Kjorlien, A. K. Peach and M. Porter. 2008. Alberta Fur Trade Post Pre-Field Inventory and Assessment, Volume I: Fur Trade Post Inventory. Manuscript on file, Historic Resources Management Branch, Alberta Culture. Edmonton, Alberta.
