= Fort Sturgeon =

Coordinates: 53.2049°N 105.85503°W

Fort Sturgeon (1776–1780) was an early trading post on the North Saskatchewan River, located about 4 miles west of Prince Albert, Saskatchewan. Operated by the North West Company, it was also known by several alternative names including Peter Pond Fort, Fort Pond, Fort la Prairie, Fort des Prairies, Lower Settlement, and Fort Sturgeon River.

It was located on the north bank of the river just east of the mouth of the Sturgeon River (Saskatchewan) in the Aspen parkland country. To the south the grassland made a sort of "bay" into the forest. The woods to the north provided furs and the grassland to the south buffalo for food.

About 1775 a group of "Pedlars" (independent traders from Montreal) were operating downriver, near the old Fort de la Corne. Seeing the disadvantages of competition they formed a pool (in either 1775 or 1776) which by 1779 became the North West Company. Among them were Joseph Frobisher, Peter Pond, Peter Pangman, Nicholas Montour, William Bruce and Bartholomew Blondeau.

In 1776 they moved upriver and built Fort Sturgeon. In the spring of 1778 Peter Pond set off with 5 canoes and 20 men, crossed the Methye Portage for the first time and wintered on the Athabasca River, 30 miles south of Lake Athabasca, trading for furs at Pond House. He returned to his base the next year with excellent furs, thereby opening up the Athabasca Country.

In 1778 Pangman and Blondeau built a fort upstream near Silver Grove, Saskatchewan. In 1779 William Tomison of the HBC came up from Cumberland House and traded while the Pedlars were away.

The post experienced significant conflicts. In 1777, Indigenous people killed three men from Fort Sturgeon, reportedly in retaliation for alleged maltreatment. In 1780, the fort was burned to the ground during the traders' absence.

The Pedlars returned and built a new post "a little below the old House". Morton guesses this was on the north bank opposite Betts Island 1.5 miles above the Prince Albert bridge. Peter Fidler passed by in 1792 and saw only ruins.

In 1794 David Grant had a post on the Sturgeon River but did poorly because of NWC competition and being unable to control his men.

The XY Company (1798–1804) established a post two miles above the Sturgeon River, with both the Hudson's Bay Company (HBC) and North West Company (NWC) subsequently building competing posts in the same area. Historian Harold Innis mentions a "Hudson's House" built in 1776 above Prince Albert. A cairn marking the site is located at the end of Peter Pond Road off highway 3, four miles east of Prince Albert, though river erosion may have obscured physical evidence.

== See also ==
- Saskatchewan River fur trade
