= South Branch House =

Coordinates: 52.89°N 106.03333°W

South Branch House (1785–1794, 1805–1870) was the only significant fur trading post on the South Saskatchewan River. Most trade was on the North Saskatchewan River which was closer to the wooded beaver country. West of the Saskatchewan River Forks the two rivers run parallel to the northeast for about 100 miles. Between them there is a fair amount of forest.

Shortly before 1785 Peter Pangman, an independent trader, built a place he called Fort des Isles and William Holmes of the North West Company built a post nearby. In 1785 William Tomison of the Hudson's Bay Company sent Mitchell Oman to build South Branch House at a ford later called Gardepuy's crossing. The two rival traders abandoned their posts and built new ones on the opposite side of the river 400 yards downstream. The explorer David Thompson was one of Oman's clerks here in 1786/87.

In July 1794, following their destruction of Manchester House the year before, one or two hundred Gros Ventres attacked the HBC post. Only two company men were in the fort along with a handful of Indians. Two company officers, Magnus Annal and Hugh Brough, who were outside the fort were quickly killed. The two men inside barred the gate and hid in a cellar. The Gros Ventres broke in and butchered everyone inside including women and children, except for J. C. Van Dreil who managed to escape in a canoe after hiding in an abandoned cellar for eight hours. They next turned to the NWC post across the river. Duncan McGillivray's journal implies that the NWC people were unaware of what was happening at the HBC fort. An interpreter named Jacques Raphael "Jacco" Finlay was out riding and saw the Gros Ventres coming. He raced to the fort and got the men under arms. The first discharge from the fort drove the Indians back. They retired to cover and fired on the fort until they began to run low on ammunition. Their chief, L'Homme de Callumet, tried to lead a charge but was immediately shot by Finlay. The Gros Ventres recovered the chief's body and withdrew. Seeing the impossibility of defense or further trade, Louis Chatelain, the master, loaded all his men and goods on canoes and abandoned the fort.

In 1805 both companies rebuilt their posts about 6 miles upstream. With the merger in 1821 the HBC took over and operated the post until 1870.

The site is about 20 miles east of Fort Carlton on the South Saskatchewan River, about 10 miles west of Saint Louis, Saskatchewan and about 10 miles north of Batoche, Saskatchewan. It was on the right bank of the river with a hill in the background. Today the ruins are a Provincial Historic Site. There is a marker and ongoing minor archaeological work.
