= Daniel Williams Harmon =

Canadian fur trader (1778–1843)

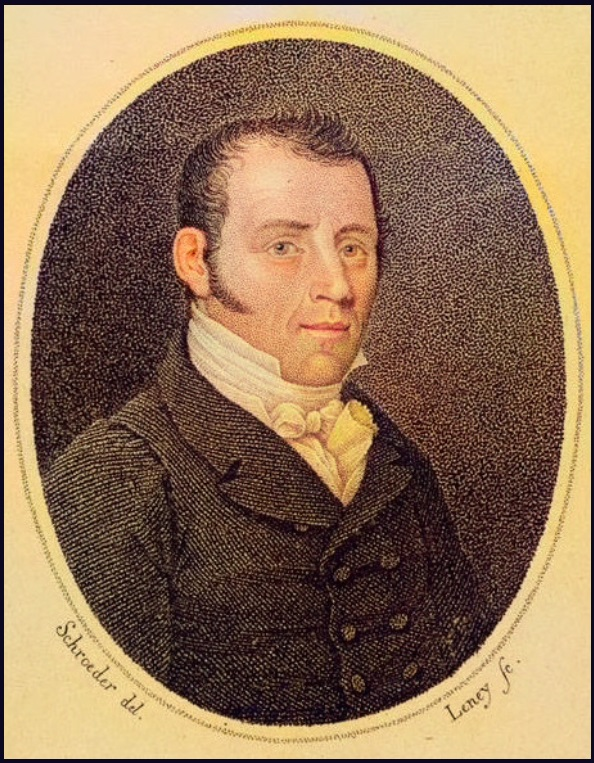
Daniel Williams Harmon, ca 1820

Daniel Williams Harmon (February 19, 1778 – April 23, 1843) was a fur trader and diarist.

Harmon was born in Bennington, Vermont on February 19, 1778, son of Daniel and Lucretia (Dewey) Harmon and died April 23, 1843, in Sault-au-Récollet (Montreal North), Lower Canada. He took a 14-year-old Métis girl as a common-law (Marriage à la façon du pays) wife Elizabeth (Lizzette) Laval (ca. 1790 - February 14, 1862) on October 5, 1805, at South Branch House, Northwest Territory, British America. Her father was a French-Canadian Coureur des bois, and her mother was from the Snare Indian tribe. Harmon had 12 children and legally married her August 19, 1819, at Fort William, Ontario, Canada.

Harmon joined the North West Company in 1800 and gradually moved westward, finally arriving in British Columbia in 1809. There he served for ten years at Fort Saint James and Fort Fraser.

Harmon was not one of the well-known names in fur-trading history. He served mostly in subordinate positions and carried out no explorations. His fame rests solely on his published journal, which documents his experience in the Canadian frontier. The journal was heavily edited and rewritten for publication by the Reverend Daniel Haskel of Burlington, Vermont, and appeared with the title, "A journal of voyages and travels in the interior of North America, between the 47th and 58th degrees of north latitude, extending from Montreal nearly to the Pacific Ocean, a distance of about 5,000 miles, including an account of the principal occurrences, during a residence of nineteen years, in different parts of the country. . ." (Andover, Mass., 1820). In addition to a description of life in the fur trade during the early years of the 19th century the work is notable for its account of the moral dilemmas Harmon confronted in the context his lingering Puritan morality and the sexual customs in the frontier. Harmon took a métis Native American Indian wife but refused the traders' practice of abandoning them and instead returned with her to Vermont and formal marriage.

The full journal consists of three parts In addition to the diary proper, there are two lengthy appendices, one on the Indians East of the Rockies (basically the Cree) and one on the Indians West of the Rockies (basically the Carrier). The latter contains the first substantial source of information about the Carrier language, in the form of a list of about 300 words. The appendices are omitted from at least one recent edition.
