= Charles-Jean-Baptiste Bouc =

Canadian politician

Charles-Jean-Baptiste Bouc (November 25, 1766 – November 30, 1832) was a businessman and political figure in Lower Canada.

He was born Charles-Baptiste Bouc in Terrebonne, the son of a merchant, and was involved in the trade of grain and furs, as well as lending money. In 1785, he married Archange Lepage. He inherited some livestock and property from his father. In 1796, he was elected to the Legislative Assembly of Lower Canada for Effingham. He was found guilty of defrauding a local wheat farmer in 1799 and he was jailed and then expelled from his seat in the house. In 1800, Bouc was elected again but was again expelled. Bouc was elected in subsequent by-elections and expelled two more times. Alexis Caron, a lawyer who later was elected to the legislative assembly for Surrey, represented Bouc. In April 1802, the assembly passed a bill with the explicit stated purpose of preventing Bouc from ever sitting in the assembly. Pierre-Amable de Bonne and members of the Bureaucrat party supported the expulsion of Bouc; many of the members of the parti canadien opposed these actions. Angus Shaw was elected for Effingham after Bouc had been expelled for the last time.

Bouc continued to be a leading figure in the community until he was convicted of treasonable practices in 1807 and then for fraud and theft in 1811. He was forced to retire from business and sell some of his property to cover his debts. He died at Terrebonne in 1832.

His son Séraphin became a farmer and was later elected to the legislative assembly for Terrebonne.
