= Paint Creek House =

Coordinates: 53°39′50″N 110°20′05″W

Paint Creek House and Fort Vermilion (not to be confused with the Fort Vermilion in Mackenzie County, Alberta) were a pair of fur-trading posts on the North Saskatchewan River in Alberta, Canada, approximately 13 km (8.1 mi) west of the Saskatchewan border. Paint Creek House belonged to the Hudson's Bay Company (HBC) and Fort Vermilion to the North West Company (NWC). For background see Saskatchewan River fur trade.

== Usage ==
In use from 1802 to 1816, both forts were on the north bank of the river across from Lea Park, which is at the mouth of the Vermilion River. They were inside a common stockade for protection, with Paint Creek House on the east and Fort Vermilion on the west. The location on the north bank also provided some protection from the Plains Indians to the south. Fort Vermilion was also known as Lower Fort des Prairies.

== History ==
The 1802 foundation date is not certain. In 1808, Alexander Henry 'The Younger' was in charge for the NWC and Henry Hallet for the HBC. Alexander Henry's journals indicated the post had 106 people (30 servants and their families). In September 1809, Henry returned from Fort William, Ontario, and found some 300 tents of Blackfoot waiting for his trade goods. While trading he kept a swivel gun pointed at their camp to ensure good behavior. In 1810, both companies decided to move upriver to Fort Edmonton #3 at the northernmost point on the river; Fort Edmonton #2 was moved downstream at the same time, while the NWC post of Fort Augustus was paired with Edmonton and moved with it. The move started that spring but the old forts remained open. When Gabriel Franchère arrived in 1814, he found some 90 people there but few provisions to buy. Both posts were closed permanently in May 1816.

Around 1980, there were a few cellar holes in a clearing at the end of a dirt road east of the Alberta Highway 897 bridge.

The archeological site was designated a provincial historic resource in 1976.
