= Fort La Jonquière =

Historic fort in what is now Saskatchewan, Canada

- Along the Saskatchewan River near Nipawin, Saskatchewan

Site information
- Controlled by: New France

Site history
- Built: 1751
- In use: ca. 1751-1753

Fort La Jonquière was a French fort built along the Saskatchewan River in the spring of 1751. It was purported to have been the furthest west outpost of New France. The fort was named after the Governor General of New France at the time, Jacques-Pierre de Taffanel de la Jonquière, Marquis de la Jonquière, by Jacques Legardeur de Saint-Pierre, western commander of the French (1750-1753). There is no surviving record of its exact location, nor physical evidence, but it was most likely located near Nipawin, Saskatchewan.

== Construction ==
Fort La Jonquière and Fort de la Corne were the two forts established by the French along the Saskatchewan in the 20 years between the end of La Vérendrye's push west from Lake Superior in 1743 and the fall of New France in 1763. Saint-Pierre was the second of the four western commanders who followed La Vérendrye. According to his memoir he ordered fur trader and explorer Joseph-Claude Boucher, Chevalier de Niverville, to travel 300 lieues (leagues) up the Saskatchewan from Fort Paskoya, thought to be near the sources of the Missouri and streams running west to the Pacific, and build a fort there. Ten Frenchmen in two canoes—Niverville himself was too ill to travel—set out from Fort Paskoya on 29 May 1751.

Saint-Pierre's memoirs are the only reference to the fort being named "La Jonquière":

L'ordre, que j'avois donné à M. de Niverville, d'aller établir un fort, à trois cens lieues plus haut que celui de Paskoya, fut exécuté le 29 May 1751. Il fit partir dix hommes en deux canots, lesquels remontèrent la rivière du Paskoya jusqu'à les montagnes de Roche, où ils firent un bon fort, que je nommay le fort La Jonquière, et un amas considérable de vivres, en attendant l'arrivée de M. de Niverville, qui devoit partir un mois après eux, ce qu'il ne put faire à cause d'une grande maladie qu'il eut.

— Jacques Legardeur de Saint-Pierre
Translation:

The order that I had given to M. de Niverville to go build a fort three hundred leagues above the Paskoya one, was carried out 29 May 1751. He had ten men leave in two canoes who went up the Paskoya River as far as the Rock Mountains where they built a good fort, which I named Fort La Jonquière, and a considerable stock of provisions while waiting for the arrival of M. de Niverville, who was to have left one month after them, which he could not do because of a serious illness that he had.

— translated by Joseph L. Peyser (Note: Peyser cross-referenced Pierre Margry and Douglas Brymner's 1886 translations with an original copy of Saint-Pierre's journal from the Haldimand Collection.)

Saint-Pierre wrote that he left Fort La Reine on November 14, 1751 to visit Fort La Jonquière, but never reached it. He was stopped along the way by a pair of Frenchmen and four Indians who informed him that Niverville was still ill, and that the "YhachéIllini/Jhatcheouilini" (Note: Saint-Pierre used a variety of spellings, likely corruptions of the Cree word ayahciyiniw (ᐊᔭᐦᒋᔨᓂᐤ; "stranger"), referring to the Slavey or Blackfoot.) Indians who were to have been his guides through "Kinongeouilini" (Ojibwe) territory were attacked by a band of "Assinibouels" (Assiniboine). Saint-Pierre returned to Fort La Reine to overwinter, in the spring of 1752 was recalled to Canada by the new Governor General the Marquis Duquesne, and died in combat in 1755.

== Historical record ==
No other period sources substantiate Fort La Jonquière's location. In a 1757 address Louis Antoine de Bougainville, Montcalm's aide-de-camp during the Seven Years' War, listed all of the French "Western Sea" outposts at the time: Saint-Pierre, Saint-Charles, La Reine, Dauphin, Bourbon, Paskoya and des Prairies. Fort La Jonquière was conspicuously absent from his list. After the war Guy Carleton, Governor of Quebec, wrote a letter to Lord Shelburne on 2 March 1768 describing the reach of French fur trade commerce as of 1754. Of the westernmost of the French forts, Carleton wrote, "A fort was erected one hundred leagues beyond Paskoyat, but I have not information enough to put either the fort or the full extent of the river on the map..."

The reports and maps of the Hudson's Bay Company surveyors who explored along the Saskatchewan River in the latter half of the 18th Century—Anthony Henday in 1755, Matthew Cocking in 1772, Peter Fidler in 1792—never mentioned any French forts west of Fort de la Corne. The map created by the North West Company's Peter Pond in 1785 marked a spot below the forks of the Saskatchewan with the note "This is the highest point the French Traders possessed". British free trader Thomas Curry, determined to find the extent of the territory explored by the French, ventured from Michilimackinac to Fort Bourbon in 1767 and returned the following spring with four canoes full of the finest pelts. James Finlay followed Curry's example and according to Alexander Mackenzie travelled as far as "Nipawee, the last of the French settlements on the bank of the Saskatchiwine [sic] river".

== Location hypotheses ==
Saint-Pierre's reference to "the Rock mountains" and a distance of 300 French leagues up the river from Fort Paskoya (near the modern town of The Pas) led subsequent historians to hypothesize that Niverville's men had travelled as far west as the foothills of the Rocky Mountains, which would have made them the first Europeans to have reached what is now Alberta and to have seen the Canadian Rockies (preceding Henday by three years). Over a century later, taking Saint-Pierre's written account to be accurate, historian Benjamin Sulte wrote that Fort Calgary was situated on the site of the former Fort La Jonquière. NWMP Inspector Éphrem Brisebois alleged that he found the remains of an old fort, which he presumed was La Jonquière, when the detachment arrived there in 1875.

On the other hand geologist Joseph Tyrrell speculated in his 1886 report on the natural history of Alberta to Alfred R. C. Selwyn, director of the Geological Survey of Canada, that it was more likely that Niverville's men would have ascended the North Saskatchewan instead of the south because the Cree that inhabited the territory along the northern branch had been known to the French prior and were on friendly terms, whereas the Blackfoot to the south "were always understood to be very fierce and hostile".

Historian Arthur S. Morton's research concluded that it was "... beyond reason that Saint-Pierre should leave Fort La Reine, at Portage la Prairie, on 14th November, with the blizzards of winter ready to break upon the treeless plains, to travel on foot across unknown territory and among tribes till recently bitterly hostile to one another, a distance of some five hundred and fifty miles. Then, too, his narrative shows that in spite of his mention of the Rockies, the fort could not have been so far west." He dismissed the inference that Fort La Jonquière was located near Calgary and attributed the remains Inspector Brisebois found to an American fur-trading fort built in 1833. Instead, Morton believed the fort couldn't have been any further west than the elbow of the South Saskatchewan, and may have been located only 200 yards west of Fort de la Corne, near the Saskatchewan River Forks.

In his work on the La Vérendryes, Fr. Antoine Champagne analyzed Saint-Pierre's writings and given the written accounts of Bougainville, Carleton, Henday, Cocking, Pond, Mackenzie and others that followed made no mention of Fort La Jonquière, like Morton he expressed that it was unlikely Fort La Jonquière was anywhere near the Rockies. Given how inaccurate the distances on scaled maps of the period were, Champagne calculated the fort would have been located only about 100 miles as the crow flies west of Fort Paskoya, about 160 to 180 miles along the river, which would place it near Nipawin.
