= Fort Carlton =

Historic trading outpost and current provincial park in Saskatchewan, Canada

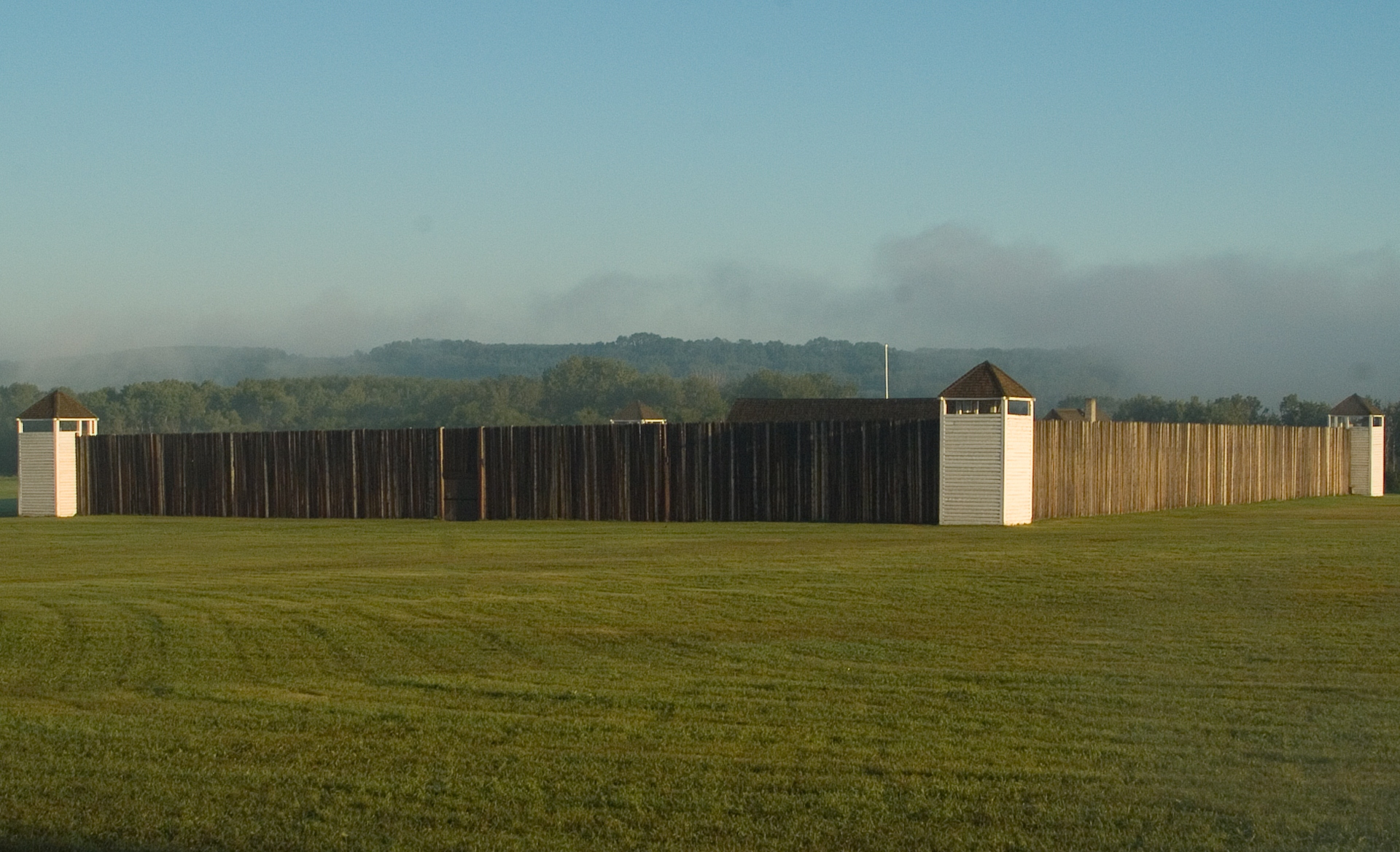
- Exterior view of Fort Carlton's palisades

- Location within Saskatchewan Location within Canada
- 52.8698°N 106.5298°W
- Location: RM of Duck Lake No. 463, Saskatchewan, Canada

History
- Built: 1810 (Note: The following year was when Fort Carlton was erected on the current site. However, the first building in the area named Carlton House / Fort Carlton was erected in 1795. The building was moved once in 1805, before it was relocated to its final site in 1810.)
- Original use: Trading post
- Demolished: 1885
- Rebuilt: 1967

Site notes
- Current use: Historic site/museum
- Governing body: Sask Parks
- Owner

National Historic Site of Canada
- Official name: Carlton House National Historic Site of Canada
- Designated: 1976

Fort Carlton was a Hudson's Bay Company fur trading post from 1795 until 1885. It was located along the North Saskatchewan River not far from Duck Lake, in what is now the Canadian province of Saskatchewan. The fort was rebuilt by the government of Saskatchewan as a feature of a provincial historic park and can be visited today. It is about 65 kilometres (40 mi) north of Saskatoon.

== History ==
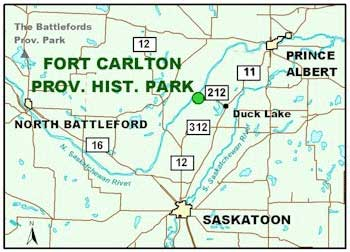
Location of Fort Carlton

First called Carlton House, there were several historic Fort Carlton posts that operated in different periods and at three locations. Two posts were established in 1795 and 1805 respectively. A series of forts named Fort Carlton operated at a third location starting in 1810.

=== Three locations ===
- The first Fort Carlton (1795–1801) was built at a safer site near the old French post of Fort de la Corne in 1795 following the destruction of South Branch House. James Bird was in charge; James Sandison (Sanderson) was his assistant; and John Peter Pruden was an apprentice. From 1799 to 1801, Joseph Howse (Howes) was the writer in charge. The North West Company (NWC) had a nearby post called Fort St. Louis. It produced few furs and was closed in 1801.
- The second Fort Carlton (1805–1810) was built on the South Saskatchewan River six miles upstream from the former South Branch House. Joseph Howse (Howes) was a trader. There was a nearby NWC post. In 1810 both companies abandoned the South Saskatchewan and moved to the third Fort Carlton.
- The third Fort Carlton (1810–1885) was built on the south bank of the North Saskatchewan at the Great Crossing Place, a ford of that river. John Peter Pruden was master (1814–1815), master and trader (1815–1820), and chief trader (1821–1837) except for a brief furlough to London in 1824–1825. The area was prairie and not beaver country, but there were plentiful woods nearby and even a supply of limestone. The NWC had its Fort La Montée inside the same stockade as the HBC's Fort Carlton. In 1816 the Nor'Westers moved out and established a second Fort La Montée on the north bank 3 miles upstream. With the union in 1821 La Montée was abandoned and whatever could be salvaged was rafted down to Fort Carlton. In 1824 a group of First Nations people attacked Fort Carlton but were driven off. By 1835 the buildings were in disrepair and a new hexagonal fort was built 200 yards to the west. This fell into disrepair and a new fort was built a few yards east of the first fort in 1855–1858. About this time it was a depot for the winter express mail. Men coming from the upper Saskatchewan and Athabasca Rivers would meet and exchange mail with men coming from the Red River Colony south of Lake Winnipeg. There was a smallpox epidemic in 1869. Steamboats arrived on the Saskatchewan River in 1874.

The last fort at this location burned down in 1885 after a period of use as a police post (see below).

=== Commercial ===
As a Company post it primarily dealt in provisions, namely pemmican and buffalo robes although other furs were traded as well. Lawrence Clarke served as its last Chief Factor. It was a major base of operations for the Saskatchewan District of the Hudson's Bay Company.

Situated on the Carlton Trail, running from the Red River Colony in present-day Manitoba to Fort Edmonton in what is now Alberta, Fort Carlton served as an important centre for travellers.

=== Police and military use 1880–1885 ===
Treaty Six between the Canadian Crown and various Cree and Saulteaux First Nations was initially negotiated and signed near the Fort in 1876. Big Bear (Mistahimaskwa) had used the site in his initial negotiations for Treaty Six in about 1884, and the following year he surrendered here after the last engagement of the rebellion, at Steele Narrows. The Prince Albert blockhouse was employed by the Royal North-West Mounted Police on evacuating from Fort Carlton after the first fire.

The North-West Mounted Police leased the fort from the HBC in the 1880s, and it was its main base in the Saskatchewan Valley region. Following the Battle of Duck Lake it was abandoned by the police and Prince Albert Volunteers, then it was briefly occupied by Gabriel Dumont's Métis forces. The rebels soon chose to withdraw to Batoche. During the 1885 conflict, the fort was destroyed by fire.

== Provincial park and reconstructed fort ==
Fort Carlton was reconstructed in 1967 and it was designated a National Historic Site of Canada in 1976. It features a partial reconstruction of the fort c. 1880, including four replica buildings of "Red River frame" construction. In 1986 the site was designated a provincial park of Saskatchewan.

== See also ==
- Saskatchewan River fur trade
- List of protected areas of Saskatchewan
- Tourism in Saskatchewan
- History of Saskatchewan
