= Northwest Company Express =

Northwest Company Express: In fur trade days, "express" referred to the rapid delivery of mail and messages as opposed to the normal transportation by freight canoe. An express canoe was simply a normal canoe with no cargo to slow it down. In winter, snowshoes and dog sleds were used. Along the North Saskatchewan River there were horses. The first regularly scheduled express was probably the North West Company Express which ran by the usual route from Lake Athabasca eastward to the Great Lakes. After 1814, another express route ran from the mouth of the Columbia River to the Great Lakes. This evolved into the better-known York Factory Express, operated by the Hudson's Bay Company.
