= Carlton Trail =

Historic trail in the Canadian Northwest

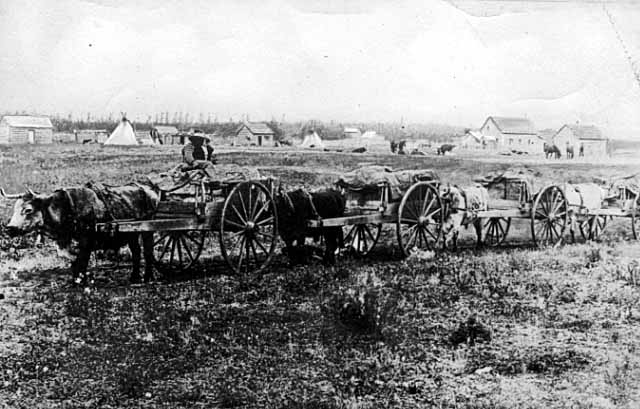
Red River ox cart train on the Carlton Trail

The Carlton Trail was the primary land transportation route in the Canadian Northwest for most of the 19th century, connecting Fort Carlton to Edmonton along a line of intermediate places. It was part of a trail network that stretched from the Red River Colony through Fort Ellice and today's Fort Qu'Appelle, Saskatchewan. From there the trail ran north and crossed the South Saskatchewan River near Batoche and reached Fort Carlton on the North Saskatchewan River. From there, it ran west on the north side of the river to Fort Edmonton at what is now Edmonton, Alberta.

An alternative, the South Victoria Trail, ran on a more direct route to and from Edmonton, on the south side of the River, following the line of the old telegraph line. A length of it still survives, at the old Krebs homestead east of Fort Saskatchewan.

The distance in total the trail travelled between Fort Garry (Winnipeg) to Upper Fort des Prairies (Edmonton) was approximately 900 miles (1,450 km). Many smaller trails jutted off from the main trail, such as the Fort à la Corne Trail in the Saskatchewan Valley.

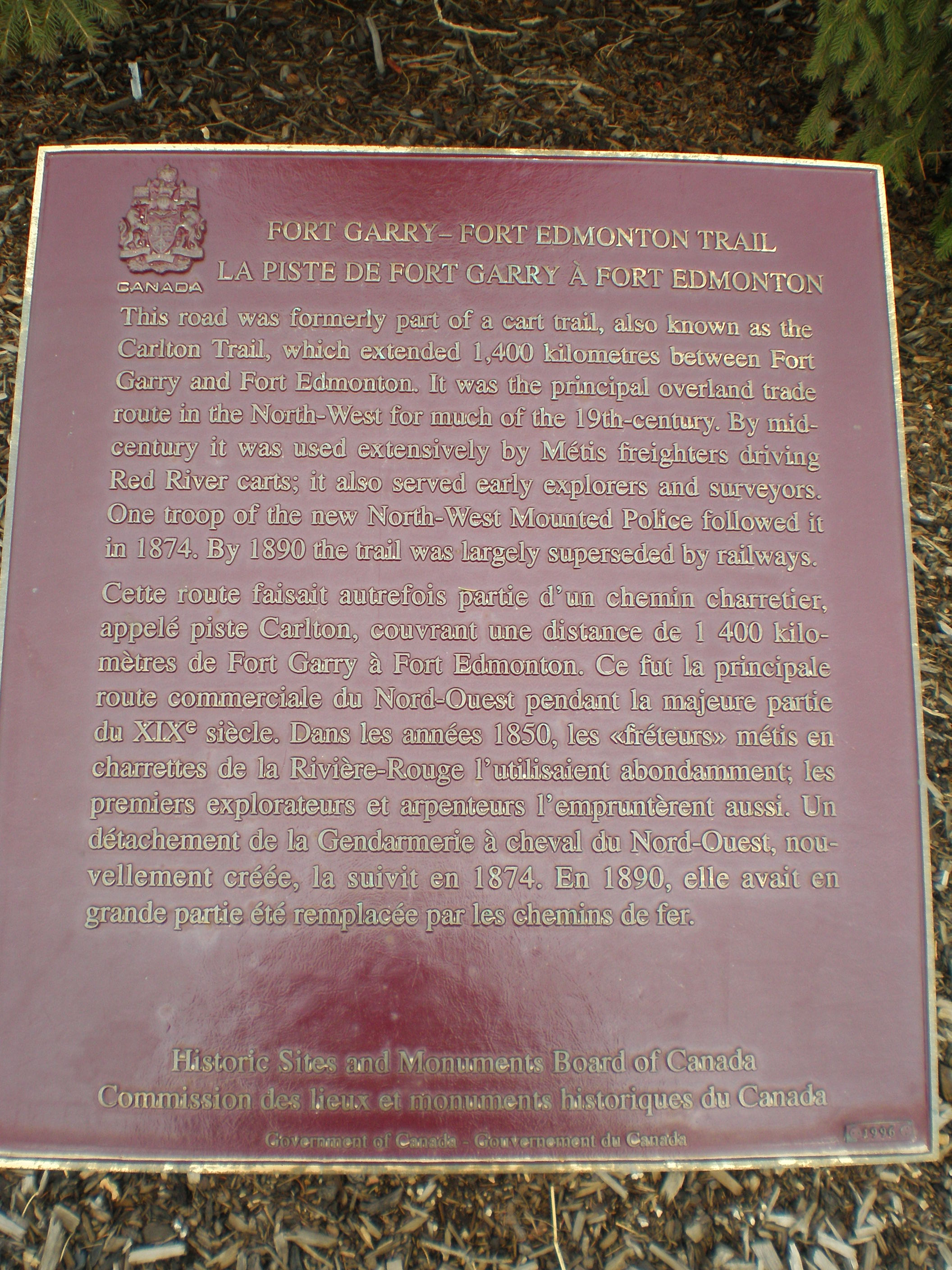
National historic site of Canada plaque

Connecting the west, the trail was of great importance during the 19th century as a highway for travellers. Different sections of the trail were known by different names in different eras, including the Company Trail, Saskatchewan Trail, Fort Ellice Trail, Winnipeg Trail, Edmonton Trail, and Victoria Trail. Historical accounts record that it took about two months to travel by Red River cart from Fort Garry to Edmonton along the Carlton Trail.

The main mode of transport along the trail was by horse-drawn Red River cart. It was an integral route for Métis freighters, and Hudson's Bay Company employees as well as the earliest white settlers. With the construction of the Canadian Pacific Railway in the late 1880s across the southern Prairies, and the numerous branch lines that followed, such as the Calgary and Edmonton Railway, the trail decreased in importance. Ironically, the railway was initially surveyed by Sandford Fleming to be built along the Carlton Trail, but John Macoun convinced the syndicate that formed the railway to take the more southernly route in 1881. By the early 1900s many portions of its length had been fenced off where it bisected plots of agricultural land, but sections of the trail, such as Victoria Trail in Edmonton and a length near Victoria Settlement, remain in use to this day.

The use of the trail was designated an event of national historic significance in 1972.

== See also ==
- Carlton Trail Regional Park
- Transportation in Saskatchewan
- Red River Trails
