= Fort de la Corne =

Fort in Saskatchewan, Canada

Coordinates: 53°09′N 104°48′W

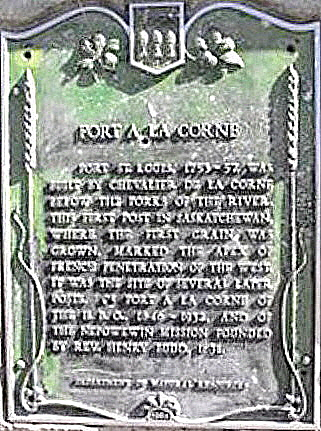
- Established: 1753
- Location: Canada

National Historic Site of Canada
- Official name: Fort à la Corne National Historic Site of Canada
- Designated: 1926

Fort de la Corne was one of the two French forts established on the Saskatchewan River in the 20 years between the end of La Vérendrye's push west from Lake Superior in 1731–1743 and the fall of New France in 1763. (The other was Fort La Jonquière built two years earlier.)

It was originally called Fort St. Louis, and later also called Fort des Prairies, Nippeween and Fort à la Corne. It was located downstream from the Saskatchewan River Forks at the mouth of the Pehonan Creek a mile west of the later HBC post.

It was built in 1753 by Louis de la Corne, Chevalier de la Corne, the third of the four western commanders who followed La Vérendrye. It was a fur trade post, the western end of the chain of posts that diverted furs away from the English on Hudson Bay and a base for exploration of the Saskatchewan which the French thought might lead to the Pacific. For most of its existence it was an outpost of Fort Paskoya. It was closed in 1759 with the fall of New France.

The site was apparently well-chosen. In 1775 the "Pedlars" built post in the area before moving upstream to Fort Sturgeon in 1776. In 1795 the Pedlars or North West Company built a Fort St Louis on the right bank of the river immediately below Peonan Creek. About five miles upstream were three more houses possibly called Isaac's House, named after Isaac Batt, and Fort aux Trembles. In 1796 the Hudson's Bay Company built the first Carleton House a mile and a half downstream. In 1846 the Hudson's Bay Company built its Fort St. Louis a few miles from original fort. This fort became linked to the Carlton Trail by a side route called Fort à la Corne Trail in the Saskatchewan Valley.

Today the Fort à la Corne Provincial Forest surrounds the site of the old fur trade posts. The site was designated a National Historic Site of Canada in 1926. The James Smith First Nation is nearby.

In the 2000s, diamond exploration was undertaken in the Fort à la Corne kimberlite field by De Beers and ShoreGold. A partnership of Rio Tinto and Star Diamond Corporation continued work through the 2010s and in early 2021 announced significant finds of commercial-grade diamonds. It was not yet known whether the project would proceed to a commercial mining operation.

== See also ==
- Saskatchewan River fur trade
