= Séraphin Bouc =

Canadian politician

Séraphin Bouc (October 27, 1788 – July 29, 1837) was a political figure, lieutenant, and farmer in Lower Canada. He represented Terrebonne in the Legislative Assembly of Lower Canada from 1834 until his death in 1837.

He was born in Lachenaie, the son of Charles-Jean-Baptiste Bouc and Archange Lepage. He operated a farm at Sainte-Anne-des-Plaines. Bouc was a lieutenant in the militia and served during the War of 1812. In 1813, he married Françoise Dalcourt. Bouc died in office at Sainte-Anne-des-Plaines at the age of 48.
