= Fort de l'Isle =

Coordinates: 53°45′11″N 111°9′27″W

Fort de l'Isle is a site in Alberta, Canada, containing the remains of three trading posts that existed from 1799 to some time before 1808. The island the North Saskatchewan River on which the posts were located is about 47 miles west of the Saskatchewan border and about 7 miles north of Myrnam. The west end of the island can be seen from the Alberta Highway 881 bridge.

A Mr. de Rochblave of the XY Company may have been the first to arrive. In 1800 both the North West Company and the Hudson's Bay Company decided to abandon their posts at Buckingham House/Fort George and move 20 miles upstream. Henry Hallett of the HBC had built the main buildings of Island House by that fall but could not build the stockade until spring, when it was possible to float logs downriver. François Decoigne from Fort Augustus upstream built Fort de l'Isle, between the other two, for the NWC. John McDonald of Garth ran the NWC post for the first two years.

In 1802 James King of the NWC and Joseph-Maurice Lamothe of the XY Company both left for an Indian camp about five days away to pick up furs that were owed to their respective companies. King tried to take furs that Lamothe claimed belonged to the XY Company, words were exchanged, and Lamothe shot King. From the time of Médard des Groseilliers it had been unclear whether Canadian jurisdiction extended beyond the Saint Lawrence basin. A Montreal grand jury brought a true bill against Lamothe, and he went to Montreal to stand trial but changed his mind and disappeared into the West to be beyond the reach of the law. This led to the passage of the Canada Jurisdiction Act of 1803, which provided that offenses committed in the West would be dealt with in the same way as those in Upper and Lower Canada. It also allowed the Governor of Lower Canada to appoint justices of the peace in the West, something that would cause trouble later.

Both posts were abandoned in favor of Fort Edmonton upstream or Paint Creek House/Fort Vermilion downstream. In 1808 David Thompson passed by and implied in his journal that the forts were gone. A marker was erected in 1960. The surviving visible remains consist of cellar depressions and piles of chimney rock. The island can be reached only by boat or by snowshoes in winter; a fairly powerful outboard is needed because of the current.

== See also ==
- Saskatchewan River fur trade
