= William Grant (fur trader) =

William Grant (1743 – November 20, 1810) was a Scottish-born fur trader and businessman in Lower Canada.

He was born in Kirkmichael, Scotland in 1743 and came to Quebec shortly after 1759, and became involved in the fur trade in the regions near Michilimackinac, Lake Superior and Lake Nipigon. Grant became partners with Gabriel Cotté and Alexander Shaw. In 1791, he formed Grant, Campion and Company with Étienne-Charles Campion and Samuel Gerrard; the firm played an important role in the development of the fur trade in the region, becoming share-holders in the North West Company and coming to an agreement with that company regarding access to trading territories. In 1787, he married Marguerite Fafard, dit Laframboise, at Trois-Rivières. He was named justice of the peace for Trois-Rivières district in 1792. Grant was also involved in importing goods from Britain. In 1795, he retired from the fur trade.

He died at William-Henry (later Sorel) in 1810.
