= Pine Island Fort =

Former trading post on the North Saskatchewan River, Canada

Coordinates: 53°13′19″N 109°3′38″W

Pine Island Fort and Manchester House were trading posts on Pine Island, a small narrow island on the North Saskatchewan River in Saskatchewan, Canada, from 1786 to 1793. Pine Island Fort was a post of the North West Company while Manchester House was a post of the Hudson's Bay Company.

Pine Island is on a south-flowing part of the North Saskatchewan River, about 50 km east of Lloydminster. It is just north of the mouth of Big Gully Creek and 18 km northeast of the town of Maidstone. The island is about 1.4 km long and 0.3 km wide.

In 1786, five independent groups established themselves on the island. First was Donald McKay, an independent trader. He was followed by Peter Pangman of Gregory, McLeod and Co., Robert Longmoor representing William Tomison of the Hudson's Bay Company, William Holmes of the North West Company and an independent Frenchman named Champagne. In the next season Donald McKay joined the HBC; Gregory, McLeod joined the NWC; and Champagne left the area. This left the HBC's Manchester House at the upper end of the island and the NWC's Pine Island Fort at the lower end. Here in 1788 the HBC built the first York boat used on the Saskatchewan. David Thompson broke his leg here in 1788. In 1792 Isaac Batt, a moderately well-known trader, went south with a group of Indians to hunt on the prairie and was murdered by them. In 1793 a large group of Gros Ventres entered the NWC post pretending to trade. When it became apparent that they intended to plunder the fort, a bold clerk took arms and drove them off. (The Gros Ventres and Mandans, who were at war with the Cree and the Plains tribes, thought that the traders were selling guns to the Cree.) In the same year Manchester House was plundered, and the traders escaped with only the clothes on their backs. In 1794 Duncan McGillivray of the NWC reported the houses in ruins. The island is not easily accessible, but in 1991 a memorial stone and plaque were erected on the river bank. As of September 2014, the plaque is still in place on top of high hill overlooking Pine Island.

Morton mentions an unnamed NWC post occupied by Edward Umfreville directly north of Maidstone and a house belonging to Donald McKay a hundred yards away.

== See also ==
- Saskatchewan River fur trade
