= George McBeath =

Canadian politician

George McBeath (c. 1740 – December 3, 1812) was a fur trader, businessman and political figure in Lower Canada.

He was born in Scotland around 1740 and came to Quebec around 1760. McBeath entered the fur trade in 1765, travelling to the Lake Superior region. In 1772, he became part of a company based at Michilimackinac. He became partners with Simon McTavish and then went into business on his own. With Peter Pond and others, McBeath purchased shares in the North West Company, which he held until 1787. He settled at L'Assomption in 1785.

He was one of the founders of the Beaver Club at Montreal. McBeath was elected to the Legislative Assembly of Lower Canada in a 1793 by-election held after the death of François-Antoine Larocque.

He was named justice of the peace for Montreal district in 1795 and, in 1799, he was appointed customs collector for the port of St Johns (later Saint-Jean-sur-Richelieu). McBeath also served as lieutenant-colonel in the militia and was reportedly a Freemason.

He died at Montreal in 1812.
