= Ferdinand Jacobs =

Hudson's Bay Company chief factor

Ferdinand Jacobs (c. 1713 – November 1783) was a Hudson's Bay Company chief factor. He joined the company's outpost in Prince of Wales's Fort (now Churchill, Manitoba) in 1732. In 1752 he was promoted to chief factor of the trading post.
