= Athabasca Country =

Historical region around Lake Athabasca, Canada

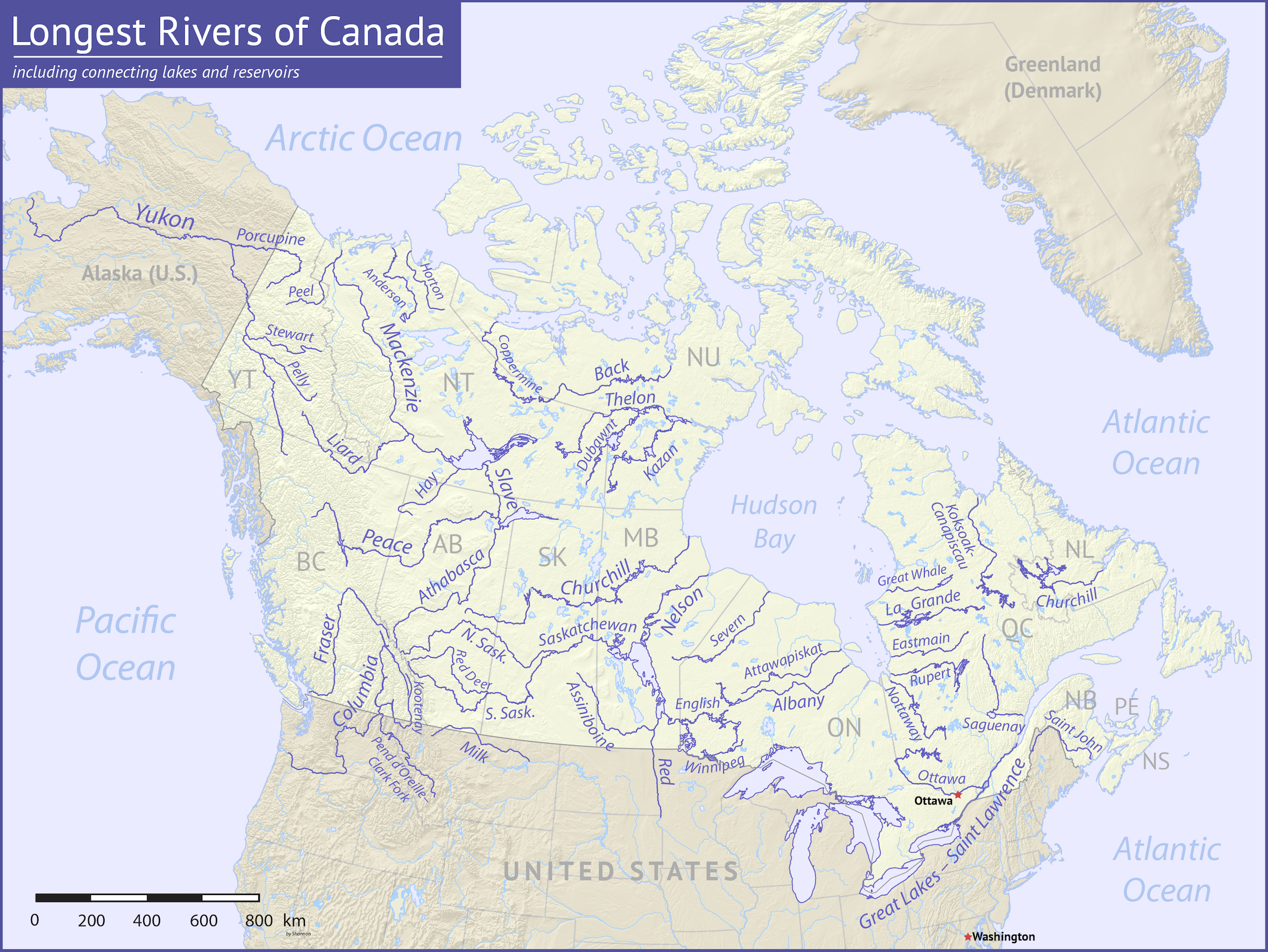
Location of Lake Athabasca in Canada

In fur trade days the term Athabasca Country was used for the fur-producing region around Lake Athabasca. The area was important for two reasons. The cold climate produced some of the densest and thickest beaver fur in North America. The number of furs produced was somewhat greater than its only rival, the Saskatchewan River fur trade. Secondly, the great distance from Montreal and Hudson Bay required the highly developed and efficient transportation system that characterized the Hudson's Bay Company in the nineteenth century.

The natural centre of the trade was the Peace-Athabasca Delta at the west end of Lake Athabasca. The lake itself led eastward into relatively poor country. To the north, the Slave River and Mackenzie River led to the Arctic Ocean. To the west, the Peace River led to the Rocky Mountains. To the south, the Athabasca River led southwest to the Rocky Mountains with connections to the Columbia District across the mountains on the Pacific coast and to the North Saskatchewan River to the south. The administrative centre of the region was the depot at Fort Chipewyan on the west end of the lake where out-going furs and in-coming trade goods were stored. The route eastward was south up the Athabasca River, east up the Clearwater River to Methye Portage, east down the Churchill River to Frog Portage, south down the Sturgeon-Weir River to the depot at Cumberland House, Saskatchewan, east down the Saskatchewan River to Lake Winnipeg and from there either to Hudson Bay or Montreal.

== See also ==
- Northwest Company Express
