= Angus Shaw =

Canadian fur trader

Angus Shaw (unknown – July 19, 1832) was a fur trader and political figure in Lower Canada.

== Life ==
He was probably born in Scotland and came to North America some time before 1786, when he is found at Montreal. With the help of the Indian agent Colonel John Campbell of Glendaruel, he entered a partnership with an experienced fur trader, Donald Mackay. This partnership traded in opposition to the North West Company and other companies on the Saskatchewan and Assiniboine Rivers of western Canada till 1788. The next year, Shaw became a clerk for the North West Company. He established a trading post near Moose Lake, Alberta and then at Fort George and Fort Augustus on the North Saskatchewan River. He established other posts on Lac la Biche and the Slave River. Shaw was made a wintering partner, with shares in the company, in 1791 or 1792. During this time, he married a native woman. In 1796, he became a member of the Beaver Club at Montreal. In 1802, he was put in charge of the King's Posts in Lower Canada on the lower north shore of the Saint Lawrence River. Later that year, he was elected to represent Effingham in the Legislative Assembly of Lower Canada in a by-election held after Charles-Jean-Baptiste Bouc's expulsion. Also in 1802, he married Marjory McGillivray, the sister of William McGillivray. In 1803, Shaw led an expedition to James Bay, which established posts on the Moose and Eastmain Rivers. In 1806, he became a partner in McTavish, McGillivrays and Company, affiliated with the North West Company, and travelled to Fort William (now Thunder Bay, Ontario) several times. Shaw was named a justice of the peace for the Indian territory in 1810. He was a major in the Corps of Canadian Voyageurs during the War of 1812.

In 1815, he took part in the destruction of the Hudson's Bay Company's Red River Colony. He was arrested by the HBC in 1816 and 1819 and later sent to London, where he was released. After 1821, Shaw retired to the United States, where he married Julia Agnes Rickman; his second wife had died in 1820.

He died of a lung infection at New Brunswick, New Jersey in 1832.
