= Saskatchewan River Forks =

Park and river confluence in Saskatchewan, Canada

Saskatchewan River Forks Recreation Site
- Location within Saskatchewan Location within Canada
- Location: RM of Prince Albert No. 461, Saskatchewan
- Nearest city: Prince Albert
- Coordinates: 53.2304°N 105.0843°W
- Elevation: 378 m (1,240 ft)
- Governing body: Province of Saskatchewan

Saskatchewan River Forks is a provincial recreation site in the Canadian province of Saskatchewan at the confluence of the North Saskatchewan and South Saskatchewan Rivers. The rivers, which have their headwaters in the Rocky Mountains, come together to form the Saskatchewan River. A major intersection when waterways were important to transportation on the Canadian Prairies, first with the fur trade and then during the riverboat era, today the Saskatchewan River Forks attract tourists, canoeists, and recreational fishermen.

The recreation site, which is maintained by the province of Saskatchewan, is about 50 kilometres (31 mi) east of Prince Albert and 33 kilometres (21 mi) north of Weldon. Access is 13 kilometres (8.1 mi) off Highway 302. The park is on the west side of the river fork and is heavily wooded with steep banks. There is a tourist picnic site, hiking trails, and historic markers.

== Saskatchewan River Forks history ==
In 1692, Englishman Henry Kelsey — while working for the Hudson's Bay Company — was the first European to reach the Saskatchewan River Forks. While he didn't set up a trading fort at the Forks, his journey helped open up the prairies for the North American fur trade. Trading posts along rivers were important to European fur traders. In 1751, a New France fur-trading post, Fort La Jonquière, was established on the Saskatchewan River (or one of its branches) possibly at, or near, the Forks by Jacques Legardeur de Saint-Pierre. In 1753, a second French fur-trading post, Fort de la Corne, was established in the area by Louis de la Corne, Chevalier de la Corne.

== See also ==
- List of protected areas of Saskatchewan
- Saskatchewan Valley
- History of Saskatchewan
- Geography of Saskatchewan
