= Alexander Henry the younger =

Canadian fur trader, explorer and diarist

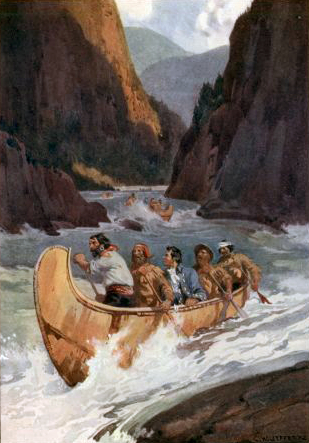
Simon Fraser's 1808 descent of the Fraser River, traveling in the same manner as Henry would have done

Alexander Henry 'The Younger' (c. 1765 – 22 May 1814), was an early Canadian fur trader, explorer and diarist. From 1799 until his premature death in 1814 he kept an extensive diary which is the most complete record ever printed of the daily life of a fur trader in the north. His journals were an account of "personal doings", but cannot be considered a diary of inward thoughts. These journals cover everything that happened to him in a most matter-of-fact manner and have yielded much material for historians and other researchers of that time period in North American history. Henry married the daughter of Liard Ah-ne-him-ish Cottonwood Little Shell, the brother of the Great Pembina Chippewa Nation Grand Chief La Petite Coquille Little Shell I Corbeau and son of The Great Sioux Nation & The Great Pembina Chippewa Nation Wazhazha Mdewakanton Grand Chief Little Crow I Petit Corbeau Red Wing I.

In 1792, with his well-known uncle of the same name, Henry became a partner in the North West Company and he was later a wintering partner of the XY Company and the Pacific Fur Company. His diaries record his travels from Lake Superior to the Pacific Ocean. In Canada, he travelled through Ontario, Manitoba, Assiniboia, Keewatin, Saskatchewan, Alberta and British Columbia. In the United States of America his travels took him through areas that comprise the modern states of Wisconsin, Minnesota, North Dakota, Idaho, Oregon, and Washington. He encountered many different tribes of Indians, and in the north saw much of the Chippewas, the three tribes of the Blackfeet, the Crees, Assiniboines, Sioux, Sarcees, and others. In the south, he reached the Mandans, the Minitari, the Rees, and even the Cheyennes, south of the Missouri River. On the west coast he saw many tribes of the Columbia River, such as the Wanapum. In 1800, during the building of Pembina Post, Red River district, the Indians were extremely inquisitive about Henry's doings with pen and paper. On 27 August 1800, Henry wrote "I told them that I kept an exact account of the Indians behaviour [also] every word they said was put down....every Indian would be rewarded according to his behaviour." In 1808, he travelled with David Thompson from Lake Winnipeg to Fort Vermilion, Alberta.

From Fort George, Henry and Donald McTavish (first cousin of Simon McTavish) were being taken back along the Columbia River by five sailors of the Royal Navy to the warship HMS Isaac Todd when their boat capsized and they drowned.

== See also ==
- Blaeberry River (named by him)
- Fort Rouge (built 1803)
