= Saskatchewan Valley =

Area of Saskatchewan, Canada

The Saskatchewan Valley is a geographic area in Saskatchewan, Canada, encompassing generally a triangle from North Battleford, to Saskatoon, north to the Saskatchewan River Forks east of Prince Albert, Saskatchewan. Historically home to the Cree aboriginal people, followed by the Métis both French and English, the Valley was opened up to large scale Euro-Canadian settlement in the late 19th and early 20th centuries.

The valley is characterized by Aspen parkland ecosystems and gently rolling hills, and forms a "V" between the North Saskatchewan and South Saskatchewan Rivers.

== See also ==
- Geography of Saskatchewan
- Palliser's Triangle
