= William Tomison =

Scottish fur trader

- Born: c. 1739; South Ronaldsay, Orkney, Scotland
- Died: 26 March 1829 (aged 89–90); South Ronaldsay, Orkney, Scotland
- Occupations: Fur trader, explorer
- Employer: Hudson's Bay Company (1760–1811)
- Known for: Founding Edmonton House; Chief Inland Master of the HBC; Smallpox epidemic humanitarian efforts
- Title: Governor of the North West Territory (local title)

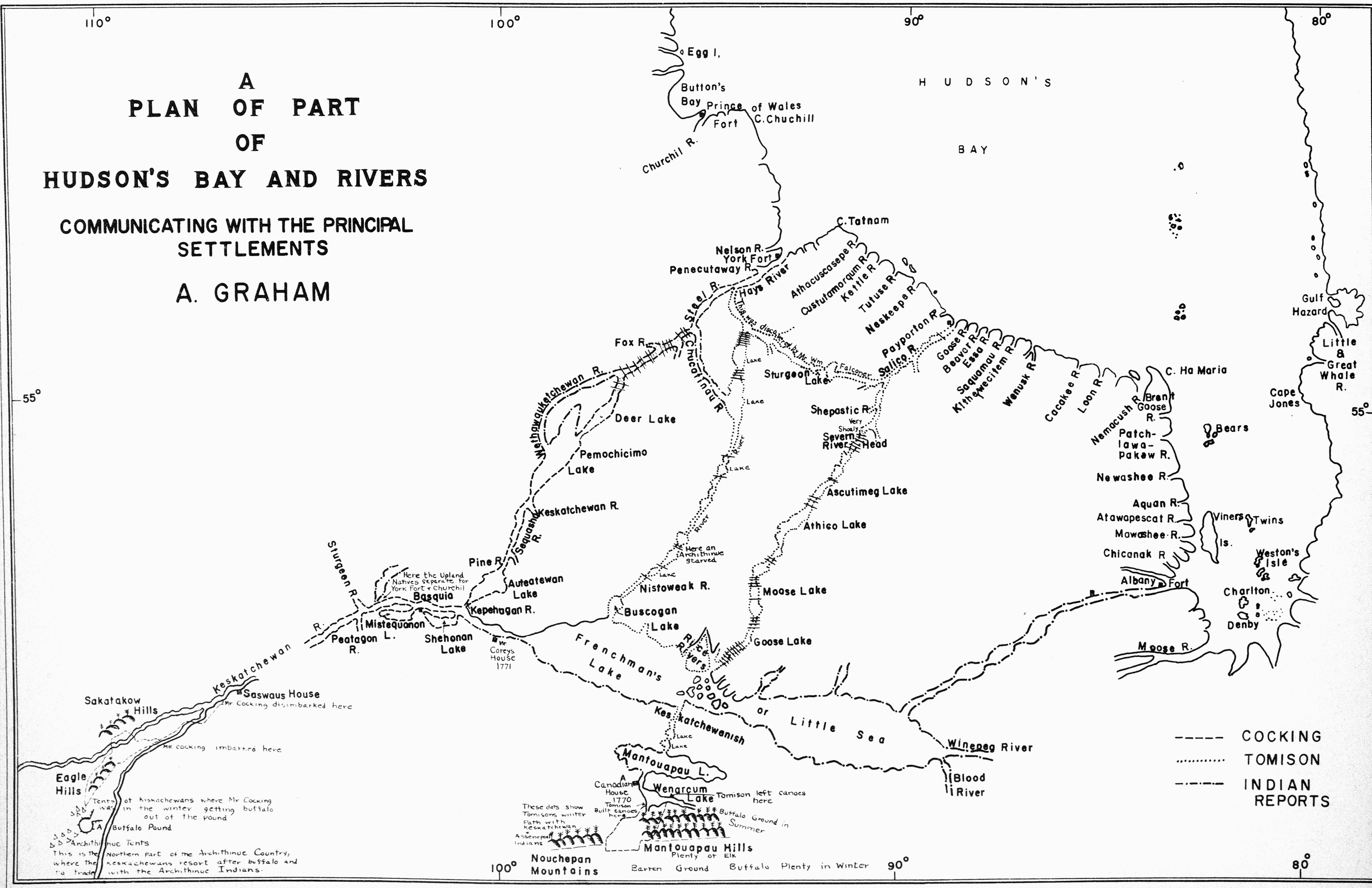
A Plan of Part of Hudson’s Bay and Rivers Communicating with Principal Settlements by Andrew Graham 1768-1770

William Tomison was a Scottish fur trader who helped to establish and build a number of trading posts for the Hudson's Bay Company, such as Edmonton House. He was involved in the fur trade for over thirty years, during which time he served in York Factory and Severn House. He managed the Cumberland House during the smallpox epidemic that affected the Cree from 1780 to 1781, providing assistance to First Nations people. Tomison served the Hudson's Bay Company for fifty-one years before retiring in 1811. During retirement, Tomison founded a school for poor children in South Ronaldsay.

== Early life ==
Tomison was born at South Ronaldsay on the Orkney Islands in 1739.

== Career ==
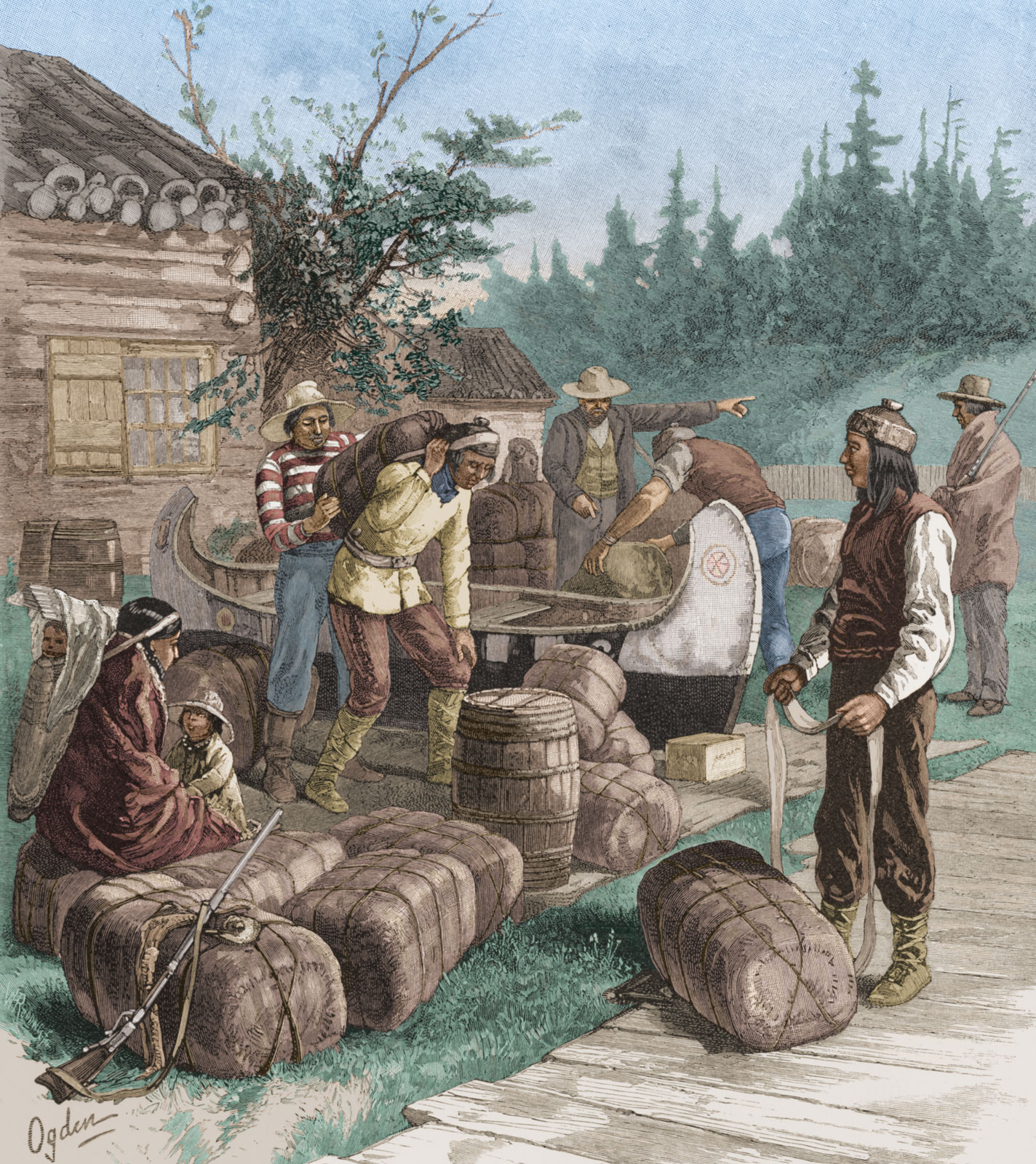
Native hunters trade 90-lb packs of furs at a Hudson's Bay Company trading post in the 1800s

William Tomison's career with the Hudson's Bay Company (HBC) started in 1760 as a laborer. At this time, there were few trading posts in some regions of Canada; in particular, there were none in the Western interior. Tomison helped the company to expand by establishing posts near existing Canadian traders along the Saskatchewan River. He was able to move through the ranks to become the Chief Inland Master of HBC in North America.

While Tomison was at Lake Winnipeg, he learned about native customs, their language, and their community. In 1767, he traveled inland from York Factory to network and create connections with the First Nations people. Many natives refused to trade or directly make deals with him, which jeopardized Tomison's promotion in the company. His journals provide details of how the men at the post worked and how he assigned tasks. Tomison tried to ensure the safety of his workers; he stated that "it's dangerous to send out men with the Natives at present, as several of them is of a very savage Nature." [sic] However, due to his observation, new procedures were used by traders; they shipped furs during the night to avoid being seen by the natives. Tomison died in March 1829 at the age of 89–90.

== Smallpox epidemic ==
At the beginning of the 1780s, there was an outbreak of smallpox in Western Canada and the Northern Great Plains. The epidemic severely affected the Cree nation, causing the population to be reduced by an estimated 70-80%. During the smallpox epidemic, Tomison's journals detailed the work that he and the employees of Cumberland House attempted to do to help the Aboriginal people. Giving detail and updates regarding the Cree who were struck by smallpox, he wrote about those that sought the traders help. From records and accounts of the time, the non-native employees did not contract smallpox during this epidemic; this is because they had developed immunity from prior exposure to smallpox, cowpox, or chickenpox.

== Edmonton House ==
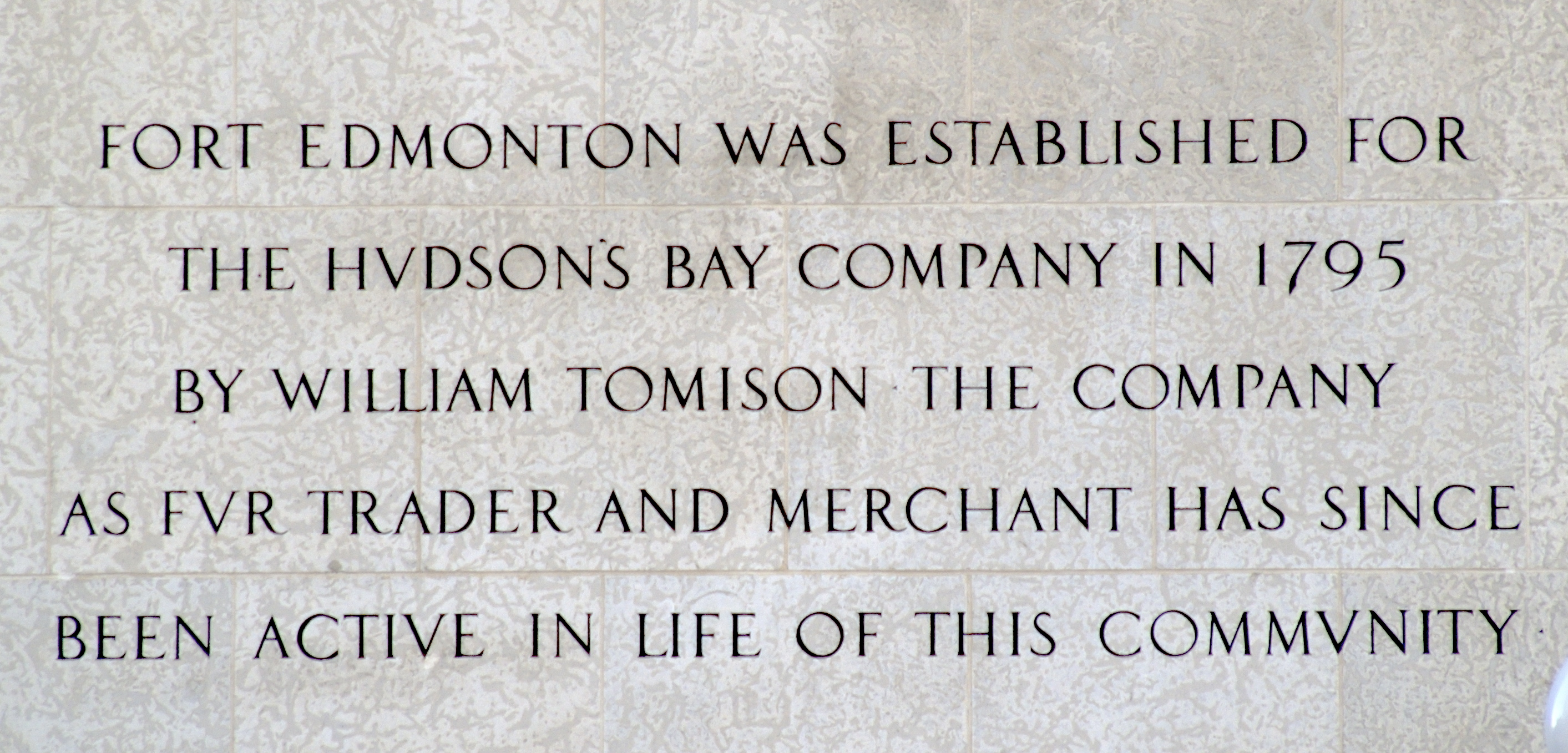
Hudson's Bay Company Edmonton engraving

Tomison was the founder of Edmonton House and the officer chief from October 1795, when it was built, to 1798, when he was succeeded by James Curtis. Buckingham House, Cumberland House, and Hudson House were other trading posts that were a part of the Hudson's Bay Company in the region.

== Food shortages ==
In 1880, there were severe food shortages, and "a dozen of the servants" were sent to the homes of indigenous families for the winter. Employees that remained at Hudson House assisted indigenous traders who arrived at the post starving. Tomison wrote of the traders who arrived at the post, "are in such a miserable Condition, that at night they are afraid to lay down, for fear of being killed and Eat[en] before day." [sic]

== Journal ==
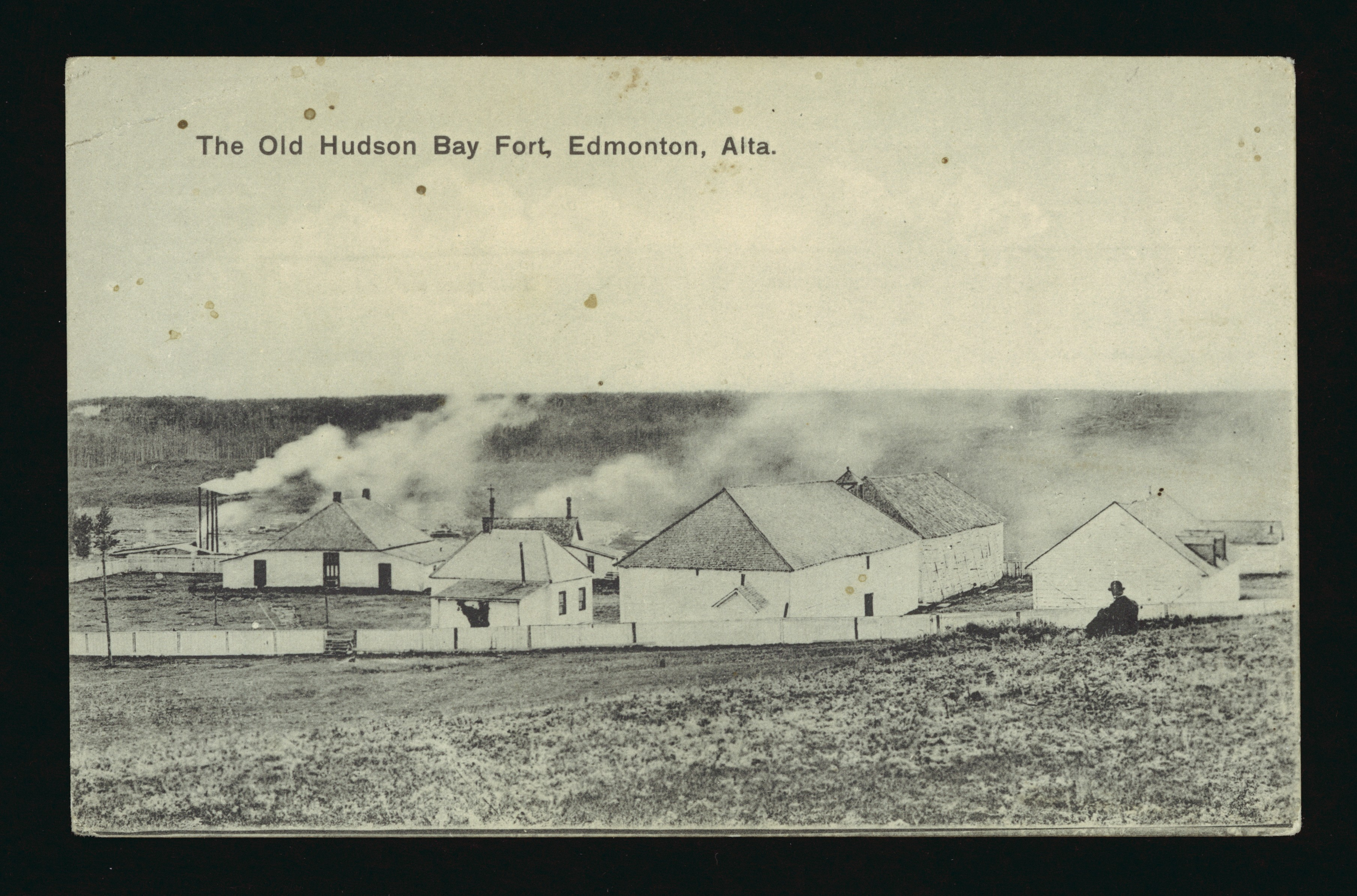
The Old Hudson Bay Fort, Edmonton, Alberta circa 1910

Excerpts from Tomison's journals, which had been stored in the company's archives, were printed in The Beaver, a magazine that was founded in 1920 by the Hudson's Bay Company. The journals showed a personal perspective of events such as the daily function of the Hudson's Bay Company, the smallpox epidemic, and relations with indigenous peoples. Entries included his private thoughts regarding how the epidemic affected the land, the people, and the business.

Tomison's journal entries give insight into the spread of smallpox in the 1780s, enabling historians, sociologists, and biologists to understand when this particular epidemic occurred, where it spanned geographically, and how it affected the region. The personal account also shows the extent to which the epidemic impacted the natives as well as the non-native workers. Tomison made many observations and accounts of daily life and the way the smallpox, starvation, and presence of workers burdened those in the surrounding area. In one journal entry on December 25, 1781, it states, "In the Evening Traded with the Indians & made them presents as Usual, but never expect to see them again." The feeling of fatalism was evident in the personal accounts of Tomison exposing his experiences of working firsthand in the fur trade and negotiating, experiencing the epidemics and starvation that spanned across Western Canada, and the violence that occurred between the indigenous people and the foreign traders.
