= North West Company =

Historical fur-trading company

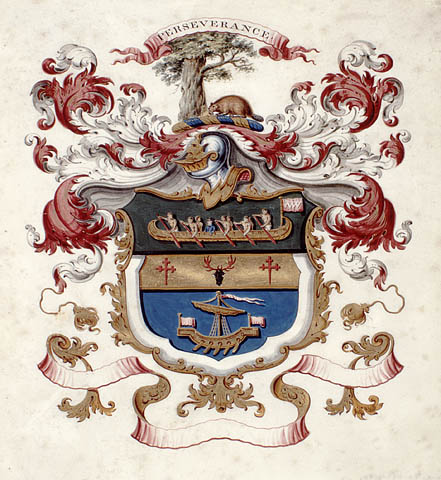
- Arms attributed to the company
- Type: Private
- Industry: North American fur trade
- Founded: 1779; 247 years ago
- Founders: Benjamin Frobisher, Joseph Frobisher, Simon McTavish, Robert Grant, Nicholas Montour, Patrick Small, William Holmes, George McBeath
- Defunct: 1821; 205 years ago
- Fate: Merger
- Successor: Hudson's Bay Company
- Headquarters: Montreal, Lower Canada
- Area served: United States territory, Russian America, British North America

The North West Company was a Canadian fur trading business headquartered in Montreal from 1779 to 1821. It competed with increasing success against the Hudson's Bay Company in the regions that later became Western Canada and Northwestern Ontario. With great wealth at stake, tensions between the companies increased to the point where several minor armed skirmishes broke out, and the two companies were forced by the British government to merge.

== Before the Company ==
After the French landed in Quebec in 1608, independent French-Canadian traders commonly known as coureurs des bois spread out and built a fur trade empire in the St. Lawrence basin. The French competed with the Dutch (from 1614) and English (1664) in New York and the English in Hudson Bay (1670). Unlike the French who traveled into the northern interior and traded with First Nations in their camps and villages, the English made bases at trading posts on Hudson Bay, inviting the indigenous people to trade. After 1731, La Vérendrye pushed trade west beyond Lake Winnipeg. After the British conquest of New France in 1763 (and the defeat of France in Europe), the management of the fur trading posts was taken over by English speakers. These so-called "pedlars" began to merge because competition cost them money and because of the high costs of outfitting canoes to the far west.

== Beginnings ==
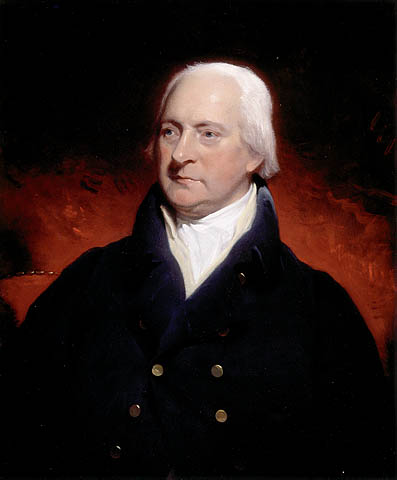
Following the 1787 death of Benjamin Frobisher, Simon McTavish dominated the company, until his own death in 1804. His nephew William McGilivray ran the company, until the Hudson's Bay Company merger of 1821.

There are historical references to a North West Company as early as 1770, including the Montreal-based traders Benjamin Frobisher, Isaac Todd, Alexander Henry the elder and others, but the standard histories trace the company to a 16-share organization formed in 1779, which included Todd, Simon McTavish and James McGill. Seeking to break the Hudson's Bay Company monopoly over the North American fur trade, in 1780, the organization was joined by Peter Pond and Alexander Ellice, with his brothers, Robert and James, (and, later, his sons, including Edward Ellice).

In the winter of 1783–1784, the North West Company was officially created on a long-term basis, with its corporate offices on Vaudreuil Street in Montreal. It was led by businessmen Benjamin Frobisher, his brother, Joseph, and McTavish, along with investor-partners who included the Ellices, Robert Grant, Nicholas Montour, Patrick Small, William Holmes, and George McBeath.

== Official founding ==
In 1787 the North West Company merged with a rival organization, Gregory, McLeod and Co., which brought several more able partners in, including John Gregory, Alexander Mackenzie, and his cousin Roderick Mackenzie. The 1787 company consisted of 20 shares, some held by the agents at Montreal (see below), and others by wintering partners, who spent the trading season in the fur country and oversaw the trade with the aboriginal peoples there.

The wintering partners and the Montreal agents met each July at the company's depot at Grand Portage on Lake Superior, later moved to Fort William. Also under the auspices of the company, Alexander Mackenzie conducted two important expeditions of exploration. In 1789, he descended the Grand River (now called the Mackenzie River) to the Arctic Ocean, and in 1793 he went overland from Peace River to the Pacific Ocean. Further explorations were performed by David Thompson, starting in 1797, and later by Simon Fraser. These men pushed into the wilderness territories of the Rocky Mountains and Interior Plateau and all the way to the Strait of Georgia on the Pacific Coast.

== Frobisher–McTavish deal ==
The death of Benjamin Frobisher opened the door to a takeover of the North West Company by Simon McTavish, who made a deal with Frobisher's surviving brother Joseph. The firm of McTavish, Frobisher and Company, founded in November 1787, effectively controlled eleven of the company's twenty outstanding shares. At the time the company consisted of 23 partners, but "its staff of Agents, factors, clerks, guides, interpreters, more commonly known today as voyageurs amounted to 2000 people." In addition to Alexander Mackenzie, this group included Americans Peter Pond and Alexander Henry the elder. Further reorganizations of the partnership occurred in 1795 and 1802, the shares being subdivided each time to provide for more and more wintering partners.

Vertical integration of the business was completed in 1792, when Simon McTavish and John Fraser formed a London house to supply trade goods and market the furs, McTavish, Fraser and Company. While the organization and capitalization of the North West Company came from Anglo-Quebecers, both Simon McTavish and Joseph Frobisher married French Canadians. Numerous French Canadians played key roles in the operations both in the building, management, and shareholding of the various trading posts scattered throughout the country, as well numbering among the voyageurs involved in the actual trading with natives.

In the northwest, the Company expanded its operations up the Saskatchewan River, establishing a fort near the site of modern-day Edmonton in 1795. NWC operations extended as far north as Great Bear Lake, and westwards beyond the Rocky Mountains. For several years, they tried to sell furs directly to China, using American ships to avoid the British East India Company's monopoly, but little profit was made there. The company also expanded into the United States' Northwest Territory (roughly today's Midwest of Michigan, Illinois, Indiana, Ohio, Wisconsin, and the northeastern part of Minnesota). In 1796, to better position themselves in the increasingly global market, where politics played a major role, the North West Company briefly established an agency in New York City.

Despite its efforts, the North West Company was at a distinct disadvantage in competing for furs with the Hudson's Bay Company, whose charter gave it a virtual monopoly in Rupert's Land, where the best furs were trapped. The company tried to persuade the British Parliament to change arrangements, at least so the North West Company could obtain transit rights to ship goods to the west needed for trading for furs. It is said that Simon McTavish made a personal petition to Prime Minister William Pitt, but all requests were refused.

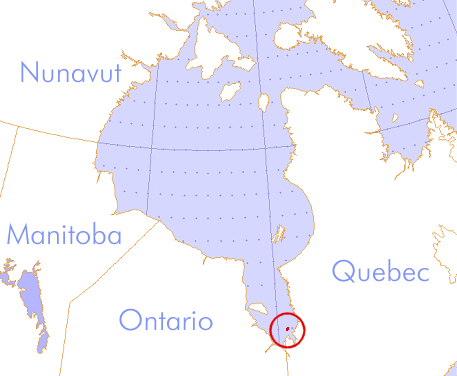
Charlton Island

A few years later, with no relief to the Hudson's Bay Company's stranglehold, McTavish and his group decided to gamble. They organized an overland expedition from Montreal to James Bay and a second expedition by sea. In September 1803, the overland party met at Charlton Island, in what is now Nunavut Territory, the Eddystone, a ship that Fraser acquired. At Charlton Island, they laid claim to the region inhabited by the Inuit, in the name of the North West Company, and were able to capitalize on the rich furs of the area. Their expansion northwestward cut into the profits of the Hudson's Bay Company. In 1800, HBC profited £38,000 in trade compared to the North West Company's £144,000 in 1800. This bold move caught the Hudson's Bay Company off guard. In succeeding years it retaliated rather than reaching a compromise, which McTavish had hoped might be negotiated.

== Late 18th/early 19th century ==
Original flag of the North West Company

The Company's flag after 1801

Simon McTavish brought several members of his family into the company, but nepotism took a back seat to ability. His brother-in-law, Charles Chaboillez, oversaw the Lower Red River trading post. McTavish also hired several cousins and his nephews William McGillivray and Duncan McGillivray to learn the business. William McGillivray was groomed by his uncle to succeed him as Director of the North West Company, and by 1796 he had effectively done so, acting as Montreal agents' representative at the annual meetings at Grand Portage, and later at Fort William.

Simon McTavish was an aggressive businessman who understood that powerful forces in the business world were always ready to pounce on any weakness. As such, his ambition and forceful positions caused disagreements between him and some of the shareholders, several of whom eventually left the North West Company during the 1790s. Some of these dissidents formed their own company, known unofficially as the XY Company, allegedly because of the mark they used on their bales of furs. Their cause was greatly strengthened in 1799, when the North West Company's hero explorer, Alexander Mackenzie, quit his old partnership and soon after joined them.

There was intense competition between the rivals. When Simon McTavish died on 6 July 1804, the new head William McGillivray set out to put an end to the four years' rivalry. It had escalated to a point where the master of the North West Company post at Great Bear Lake had been shot by an XY Company employee during a quarrel. McGillivray was successful in putting together an agreement with the XY Company in 1804. It stipulated that the old North West Company partners held 75 per cent of the shares, and the former XY Company partners the remaining 25 per cent. Alexander Mackenzie was excluded from the new joint partnership.

Under William McGillivray, the Company continued to expand, and apparently to profit, during the first decade of the 19th century. Competition with the Hudson's Bay Company was intense, however, and profit margins were squeezed. The North West Company branch in New York City had allowed the Canadians to get around the British East India Company's monopoly and ship furs to the Chinese market. Cargo ships owned by the North West Company conveniently sailed under the American flag, and doing so meant continued collaboration with John Jacob Astor.

However, Astor was as aggressive as Simon McTavish had been. An intense rivalry soon developed between him and William McGillivray over the Oriental market and westerly expansion to unclaimed territory in what is now the Columbia River basin, in the present-day states of Washington and Oregon. Astor's Pacific Fur Company beat the North West Company in an effort to found a post near the mouth of the Columbia, Fort Astoria. A collapse in the sea otter population and the imminent possibility of British seizure of Astoria during the War of 1812 led to its sale to the North West Company in 1813. When HMS Racoon and its Captain Black arrived, he went through a ceremony of possession, even though the fort was already ostensibly under British control. Due to treaty complications of the Treaty of Ghent requiring the return of seized assets, putative ownership of the site was returned to the United States in 1817. Renamed as Fort George by the North West Company, continued to operate until the Hudson's Bay Company's takeover and the replacement of Fort Astoria by Fort Vancouver.

The Canadian fur trade began to change in 1806, after Napoleon Bonaparte ordered the blockade of the Baltic Sea as part of the ongoing struggle between France and Britain for world dominance. Britain was dependent for almost all of her timber on the Baltic countries and on the U.S. states of New Hampshire and Massachusetts (which at that time included the large territory of Maine). By then, however, tensions had also begun to escalate again between Britain and the United States.

In 1809 the American Government passed the Non-Intercourse Act, which effectively brought about an almost complete cessation of trade between the two countries. Britain became totally dependent on her Canadian colony for her timber needs, especially the great white pine used for ships' masts. Almost overnight, timber and wood products replaced fur as Canada's number one export. Fur remained profitable, however, as it had a high value-to-bulk ratio. In an economy short of ready money, fur was routinely used by Canadian merchants to remit value to their London creditors.

== Forced merger ==
By 1810, another crisis hit the fur industry, brought on by the over-harvesting of animals, the North American beaver in particular. The destruction of the North West Company post at Sault Ste. Marie by the Americans during the War of 1812 was a serious blow during an already difficult time. In addition, the company was hurt by the refusal after the war with the United States to let Canadian traders freely cross its northern border. This reduced much of the border trade, which had previously been profitable for them, and artificially divided traders' relations with those several Native American tribes whose territories spanned the border.

All these events intensified competition between the companies. When Thomas Douglas convinced his fellow shareholders in the Hudson's Bay Company to grant him the Selkirk Concession, it marked another in a series of events that would lead to the demise of the North West Company. The Pemmican Proclamation, the ensuing Battle of Seven Oaks in 1816, and its violence, resulted in Lord Selkirk arresting William McGillivray and several North West Company proprietors. He ordered the seizure of their outpost property in Fort William and charged them with the deaths of 21 people at Seven Oaks. Although this matter was resolved by the authorities in Montreal, over the next few years some of the wealthiest and most capable partners began to leave the North West Company, fearful of its future viability. The form of nepotism within the company too had changed, from the strict values of Simon McTavish to something that was harming the business in both its costs and morale of others.

By 1820, the company was issuing coinage, each copper token representing the value of one beaver pelt. But the continued operations of the North West Company were in great doubt, and shareholders had no choice but to agree to a merger with their hated rival after Henry Bathurst, the Secretary of State for War and the Colonies, ordered the companies to cease hostilities. In July 1821, under more pressure from the British government, which passed new regulations governing the fur trade in British North America, a merger agreement was signed with the Hudson's Bay Company. By this, the North West Company name disappeared after more than 40 years of operations. At the time of the merger, the amalgamated company consisted of 97 trading posts that had belonged to the North West Company and 76 that belonged to the Hudson's Bay Company. When the competition between both companies came to an end, new board of directors wanted two field governors to oversee the newly defined territory, and George Simpson was appointed to the Northern Department. George Simpson (1787–1860), the Hudson's Bay Company Governor-in-Chief of Rupert's Land, who became the Canadian head of the northern division of the greatly enlarged business, made his headquarters in the Montreal suburb of Lachine. The trading posts were soon reduced in number to avoid redundancy.

== Social and ethnic structure ==
The masters or the bourgeois of the North West Company were most often of Scottish descent, whether born in Canada or Scotland, and brought capital to the enterprise. Over time, many were related, since sons and nephews were recruited. The servants or engagés were most often Canadiens, mostly peasants' sons from the countryside around Montréal. Many Métis sons followed in their fathers' footstep, whether as bourgeois or engagés. Through descent and education, the bourgeois laid claim to the status of gentlemen, while the engagés did the physical labour.

=== Bourgeois ===
The bourgeois or masters of the North West Company belonged to three different levels, depending on the role performed in the company.

Montreal merchants, or agents de Montréal were owners of trading companies and shareholders in the North West Company. They were responsible for hiring staff, exporting furs, acquiring supplies, merchandise and provisions, and organizing their shipment to the inland trading posts. For this, they received commissions, in addition to the profits they made as shareholders.

Wintering partners or associés were also shareholders in the company, owning one or two shares each. They were not salaried, but received their income from the company's profits through their shares. Trading goods were advanced to them on credit by the agents of Montreal. They wintered in the interior, managing a district with several trading posts, and were in charge of the actual trade with the Indians. During the summer, the agents and the associates met at Fort William. The wintering partners normally began their career path as clerks.

The clerks or commiss were salaried employees. They began their career as apprentices serving five to seven years, before advancing to clerks and bookkeepers. Each hoped to become a shareholding partner, although many remained clerks.

=== Engagés ===
The engagés or servants did not constitute a uniform group with equal status. The lowest level of the status pyramid was formed by the voyageurs, who paddled between Montreal and the posts around the Great Lakes. Seasonally employed, they were known by their diet and referred to as mangeurs du lard ('pork-eaters'). Hivernants, or wintering servants, who paddled canoes from the Great Lakes to the interior trading posts, and worked at them during the winter, formed the next higher band of employees. Status and pay differed depending on a man's role in the canoe. The milieu or middleman was the drudge of canoe travel, while the responsibilities of the bowsman or devant and the steersman or gouvernail were rewarded with up to five times as high pay as a common middleman, especially if serving as leader of a brigade of canoes. Interpreters and guides could earn up to three times as much as a middleman.

=== Social dynamics ===
The social dynamics of the company was rooted in kinship and descent or ethnic origin. The company was formed by a closed network of persons of Scots descent related through blood or marriage. Several important Montreal agents were related to Simon McTavish; and his successors, brothers William and Duncan McGillivray, were his nephews. Of 128 leading figures in the company, 77 were of Scots descent. Due to the prevalent kinship structures, it was all but impossible for unrelated men to advance from engagé to bourgeois.

== Company staff ==
Beyond the non-operating investors, these were some of the post proprietors, clerks, interpreters, explorers and others of the nearly 2,500 persons employed by the North West Company in 1799:

- Athabaska (Fort George, Fort McLeod, Fort St. James, Rocky Mountain Portage):
  - John Finlay (proprietor), Simon Fraser, Alexander MacKenzie, Duncan Livingston, John Stuart, James Porter, John Thompson, James McDougall, G. F. Wintzel, John Steinbrucks;
- Upper English River:
  - Angus Shaw (proprietor), Donald MacTavish (proprietor), Alexander MacKay, Antoine Tourangeau, Joseph Cartier, Simon Réaume;
- Lower English River:
  - Alexander Fraser (proprietor), John MacGillivray, Robert Henry, Louis Versailles, Charles Messier, Pierre Hurteau;
- Fort Dauphin:
  - A. N. McLeod (proprietor), Hugh McGillis, Michel Allary, Alexander Farguson, Edward Harrison, Joseph Grenon, François Nolin, Nicholas Montour;
- Upper Fort des Prairies and Rocky Mountains:
  - Daniel Mackenzie (proprietor), John MacDonald (proprietor), James Hughes, Louis Châtellain, James King, François Décoigne, Pierre Charette, Pierre Jérôme, Baptiste Bruno, David Thompson, J. Duncan Campbell, Alexander Stewart, Jacques Raphael, Francois Deschamps;
- Lower Fort des Prairies:
  - Pierre Belleau, Baptiste Roy, J. B. Filande, Baptiste Larose;
- Upper Red River:
  - John Macdonell (proprietor), George MacKay, J. Macdonell, Jr., Joseph Auger, Pierre Falcon, François Mallette, William Munro, André Poitvin;
- Lower Red River:
  - Charles Chaboillez (proprietor), Alexander Henry the younger, J. B. Desmarais, Francois Coleret, Antoine Déjarlet, Louis Giboche;
- Lac Winipic:
  - William MacKay (proprietor), John Cameron, Donald MacIntosh, Benjamin Frobisher, Jacques Dupont, Joseph Laurent, Gabriel Attina, Francois Amoit;
- Nipigon
  - Duncan Cameron (proprietor), Ronald Cameron, Dugald Cameron, Jacques Adhémar, Jean-Baptiste Chevalier, Allen MacFarlane, Jean-Baptiste Pominville, Frederick Shults;
- Pic:
  - J. B. Perrault, Augustin Roy;
- Michipicoten and the Bay:
  - Lemaire S^{t}-Germain, Baptiste S^{t}-Germain, Léon Chênier
- Sault Ste. Marie and Sloop "Otter":
  - John Burns, John Bennet, John Johnston;
- South of Lake Superior:
  - Michel Cadotte (partner), Simeon Charrette, Charles Gauthier, Pierre Baillarge;
  - Francois Malhiot, clerk in charge at Lac du Flambeau
- Fond du Lac:
  - John Sayer (proprietor), J. B. Cadotte, Charles Bousquet, Jean Coton, Ignace Chênier, Joseph Réaume, Eustache Roussin, Vincent Roy;
- Lac La Pluie:
  - Peter Grant (proprietor), Arch. MacLellan, Charles Latour, Michel Machard;
- Grand Portage:
  - Doctor Munro, Charles Hesse, Zacharie Clouthier, Antoine Colin, Jacques Vandreil, François Boileau, Mr. Bruce.

== Organizational history ==
The history of the partnership is complex, but it is necessary to keep track of who was competing with whom. Note that the definition of partner is not completely clear. For example, after Duncan McDougall surrendered Fort Astoria, he became a NWC partner with one one-hundredth of a share.

- 1771: William Grant and several others form a partnership which they call the "N. W. Société"
- 1775: Alexander Henry the elder speaks of a pool on the North Saskatchewan similar to 1779 (see Fort Sturgeon).
- 1779: Of 16 shares: 2 shares: Todd & McGill, B & J Frobisher, McGill & Patterson, McTavish & Co, Holmes & Grant, Wadden & Co, McBeath & Co; 1 share: Ross & Co, Oakes & Co. The first three were large and closely connected. Peter Pond was a partner of McBeath and Patrick Small of McTavish.
- 1784: McGill & Todd secede. Of 16 shares: 3 shares: Simon McTavish, B & J Frobisher; 2 shares: George McBeath, Robert Grant, Nicholas Montour, Patrick Small; 1 share: Peter Pond, William Holmes. The agreement was made in January and confirmed that summer when the winterers arrived at Grand Portage for the first meeting.
- 1787: McTavish buys 1 of McBeath's 2 shares. Gregory & McLeod join. Of 20 Shares: 4 shares: McTavish; 3 shares: Joseph Frobisher; 2 shares: Patrick Small, Nicholas Montour, Robert Grant; 1 share: McBeath, Peter Pond, Holms; former Gregory & McLeod members with 1 share each: John Gregory, Norman McLeod, Peter Pangman, Alexander MacKenzie.
- 1788: Merger creates McTavish, Frobisher & Co which controls half of the NWC.
- 1790: Of 20 shares: 6 shares: McTavish & Frobisher: 2 shares: Montour, Robert Grant, Patrick Small, John Gregory, Peter Pangman, Alexander MacKenzie; 1 share: McTavish's nephew and Donald Sutherland.
- 1792: Now 46 shares. 20 Shares: McTavish, Frobisher &Co (with new partner John Gregory), 6 Shares: Alexander MacKenzie, 2 Shares: Todd, McGill & Co, Forsyth, Richardson & Co, Montour, Sutherland, Angus Shaw, 1 Share: Alexander Henry the elder & Alexander Henry the younger, Grant, Campion & Co, Robert and Cuthbert Grant, Roderick McKenzie and others.
- 1796: Frobisher retires.
- 1802: 6 shares added to be distributed to clerks.
- 1804: McTavish dies, replaced by William McGillivray. Merger with XY Company.
- 1806: McTavish, Frobisher & Co becomes McTavish, McGillivrays & Co
- 1821: Merged with Hudson's Bay Company. Former NWC owners have half the capital but little power.

XY Company or formally the New North West Company, and sometimes Alexander MacKenzie & Co. In 1798 Forsyth, Richardson & Co, Parker, Gerrand & Ogilvy and John Mure of Quebec formed the XY Company. In 1799 MacKenzie left the NWC and went to England. Next year he bought shares in XY and soon became the effective head of the firm. Alexander Henry the younger was an XY winterer. They built a number of posts close to NWC and HBC posts. The murder of an HBC man by an XY man at Fort de l'Isle led to the Canada Jurisdiction Act which extended Quebec law to western Canada. In 1804 it merged with the NWC, having 25% interest in the combined company.

The South West Company: was an 1811 attempted partnership between two North West Company firms (McTavish, McGillivrays & Co and Forsyth, Richardson & Co) and John Jacob Astor to import goods through New York and deal with the Great Lakes trade. It was mostly blocked by the War of 1812 but remnants existed until at least 1820. Astor had been dealing with the NWC since around 1787.

McTavish, Fraser & Co. was the London agent of Simon McTavish, from about 1790. John Fraser was his cousin. Simon McGillivray worked there and became a partner in 1805. Edward Ellice, a man of great influence, was involved.

Todd & McGill was formed in 1776, was in the NWC by 1779, separated in 1784 and rejoined in 1792. They apparently wanted to concentrate on the southern Great Lakes.

Gregory & McLeod joined in 1787. They employed Alexander Mackenzie, Peter Pangman and John Ross.

== Revival ==
In 1987, the northern trading posts of the Hudson's Bay Company were sold to an employee consortium that revived the name The North West Company in 1990. The new company is a grocery and merchandise store chain based in Winnipeg, with stores in Northern Canada, Alaska, US Pacific territories and the Caribbean. Its headquarters are across the street from the Forts Rouge, Garry, and Gibraltar National Historic Site of Canada, the site of an old North West Company fort.

== See also ==
- Coureur des bois
- Fort William Historical Park, a reconstruction of the Fort William fur trade post as it existed in 1816, near Thunder Bay, Ontario.
- Fur trade
- Grand Portage Indian Reservation
- Isaac Todd – a ship built at Quebec in 1811 for John McTavish to wrest Fort Astoria and its trade from the Pacific Fur Company
- List of trading companies
- North West Company Post, a restored post near Pine City, Minnesota operated as a living history museum by the Minnesota Historical Society
- North-Western Territory
- Rupert's Land
- The North West Company, the restored company
- Voyageurs
- Astoria (book)
