= La Vérendrye =

La Vérendrye, La Verendrye or Verendrye may refer to:

== People ==
- Pierre Gaultier de Varennes, sieur de La Vérendrye (1685–1749), French Canadian military officer, fur trader and explorer, often called simply "La Vérendrye". His sons were:
  - Jean Baptiste de La Vérendrye (1713–1736), explorer
  - Pierre Gaultier de La Vérendrye (1714–1755), explorer and fur trader
  - François de La Vérendrye (1715–1794), explorer and trader
  - Louis-Joseph Gaultier de La Vérendrye (1717–1761), explorer and fur trader
    - Verendrye brothers' journey to the Rocky Mountains, 1742–43

== Places ==
- La Verendrye (electoral district), in Manitoba, Canada
- La Verendrye Provincial Park, in Ontario, Canada
- La Vérendrye Trail, in Manitoba, Canada
- La Vérendrye Wildlife Reserve, in Quebec, Canada
- Parc de la Vérendrye (Le Domaine) Water Aerodrome, in Quebec, Canada
- Verendrye, North Dakota, a ghost town in McHenry County
- Verendrye National Monument, a former US national monument in North Dakota

== Other ==
- Verendrye Electric Cooperative, a public utility cooperative in North Dakota
