= Jacques Legardeur de Saint-Pierre =

New France military commander, explorer (1701–1755)

- Born: October 24, 1701; Montreal
- Died: September 8, 1755 (aged 53) Lake George (New York)
- Allegiance: France
- Branch: French Troupes de la marine
- Active: 1724–1755 †
- Rank: Commandeur/Commandant
- Commands: Fort Beauharnois; Fort La Jonquière; Ohio Country
- Conflicts: Chickasaw Wars; King George's War; Raid on Saratoga; French and Indian War; Battle of Fort Necessity; Battle of Lake George †
- Awards: Order of Saint Louis

Jacques Legardeur de Saint-Pierre (October 24, 1701 – September 8, 1755) was a Canadian colonial military commander and explorer who held posts throughout North America in the 18th century, just before and during the French and Indian War.

== Family life ==
He traced his lineage to a number of New France's prominent families. He was a grandson of Jean-Baptiste Legardeur de Repentigny (who had been elected the first mayor of Quebec City on October 17, 1663, and founded Repentigny, Quebec in 1670) and a great-grandson of explorer Jean Nicollet de Belleborne. Most immediately however, his father Jean-Paul was an adventurer and had founded a post at Chagouamigon in what is now Wisconsin in 1718. It is believed that Jacques spent a number of years there with his father where he obtained an excellent knowledge of the Indian languages and the business conducted in the trading posts.

== Military life ==
In 1724 he began military service as a second ensign with the colonial regular troops. Because of his skills as an interpreter, his early active duty involved building loyalty and support among the Ojibwa, Cree, and Sioux to assist the French in future campaigns against other First Nations tribes. From 1734 to 1737, he was commandant at Fort Beauharnois (on Lake Pepin, along the present day Wisconsin–Minnesota border) and caught in the middle of tribal rivalries. Fearing for himself and his garrison, he abandoned and burned the fort in May 1737.

From 1737 to 1740 he campaigned against the Chickasaws and drew praise for his skills in dealing with the First Nations. In 1741 he made lieutenant and was commandant of the Miami post near what is now known as Fort Wayne, Indiana for a short while. From 1745–1747 he was stationed at Montreal and carried out many military assignments, including a raid on the British colonial settlement of Saratoga, New York. In 1747 he and Louis de la Corne fought the British and their First Nations allies in the Lachine area.

From 1748–1750 he served at Fort Michilimackinac during which time he was promoted to captain. The whole period was spent negotiating a fragile peace between the warring First Nations. In 1750 Governor La Jonquière appointed him Western commander to lead in the search for the western sea, a project that had been headed by Pierre Gaultier de Varennes et de La Vérendrye who had died in 1749 while planning a new expedition. He was soon involved in a dispute with two of de La Vérendrye sons, Louis-Joseph Gaultier de La Vérendrye and Pierre Gaultier de La Vérendrye, who had been actively involved in this project with their father. To his credit, Saint-Pierre recognized their past role and apologized. During his tenure, he was quite active. He travelled several times to the area of the Red and Winnipeg rivers and Fort St. Charles on Lake of the Woods. He no doubt headquartered at Fort La Reine. At least one important post was established under his command; that being Fort La Jonquière on the Saskatchewan River (probably in the Nipawin, Saskatchewan area). The western sea explorations were not expanded much beyond that point. The story goes that when Fort La Reine was invaded by a group of Assiniboines he saved the fort by standing at the door of the powder magazine with a blazing brand and threatening to blow everyone up if they did not leave.

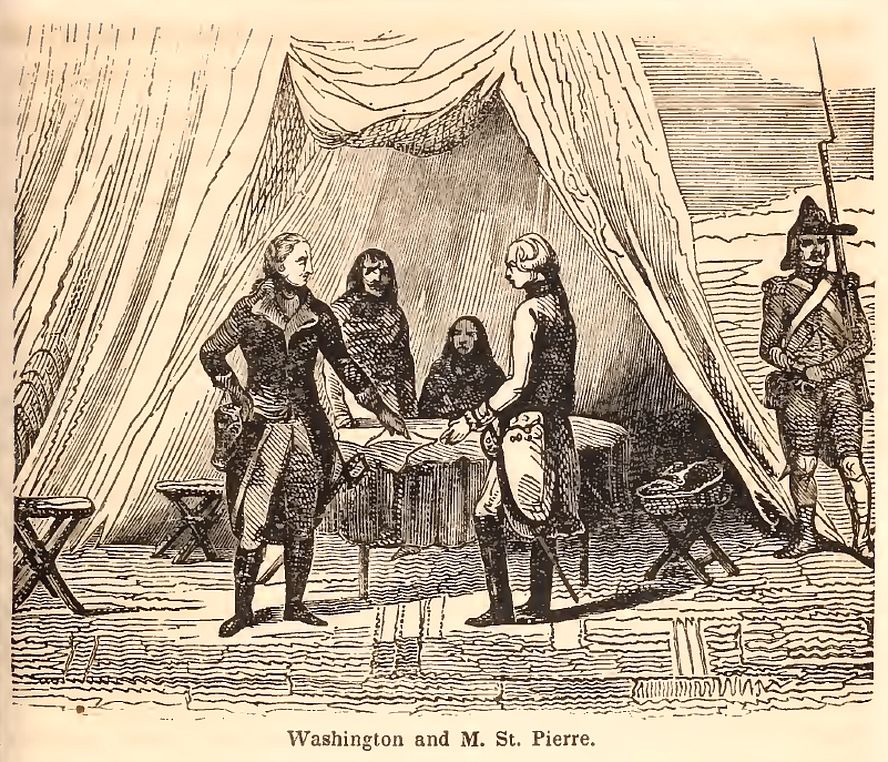
George Washington (left) meeting with French military commander Jacques Legardeur de Saint-Pierre in 1753

Returning from the western forts in 1753, Saint-Pierre was assigned to the Ohio Country, where the French and Canadians were building a strong presence in order to deal with the economic threat posed by British fur traders. Paul Marin de la Malgue constructed two forts, the main one being Fort Le Boeuf. After Marin's death, Legardeur took over Marin's command. The French occupation drew attention from the Virginia Colony, and its lieutenant governor, Robert Dinwiddie, sent a young George Washington with a written demand that the French leave the disputed territory. Much has been made of this event because of the later fame of the messenger; history records that Washington was impressed by Saint-Pierre in this encounter. After Washington in 1754 led an expedition that ambushed a Canadian party, Saint-Pierre was in the party sent from Fort Duquesne that defeated Washington at Fort Necessity. In 1755 Jacques led a large contingent of militia and First Nations from Montreal into a battle at Lac du Saint-Sacrement (as Lake George, New York was then known) and was immediately killed. These actions contributed to beginning of the French and Indian War with the eventual formal declarations of war in spring 1756.

Pierre's service to France in North America was valuable and extensive. He was a logical successor to La Vérendrye in the western forts and fur trade. He was awarded the cross of Saint Louis for his endeavors in military action. He was married but had no children. His widow remarried in 1757, to Luc de la Corne.

== Sources ==
- Fowler, William M. (2005). Empires at War: The French and Indian War and the Struggle for North America, 1754–1763. New York: Walker. ISBN 0-8027-1411-0.
