= La Colle =

Canadian politician

La Colle (fl. 1736 – 1742) was a Monsoni (a branch of the Ojibwa) chief who is known in Canadian history for this period because of the writings of La Vérendrye.

In the fall of 1731, construction began on Fort St. Pierre at the west end of Rainy Lake near the mouth of Rainy River. This was carried out by La Verendrye's nephew, Christopher Dufrost de La Jemeraye and his eldest son, Jean Baptiste de La Vérendrye over the winter of 1731-32. La Colle's main village was located in the vicinity of the fort.

La Colle was a chief with influence among the Monsonis, his own group of Swampy Cree, and also with other Crees and Assiniboine further west along the exploration route. Fort St. Charles, on Lake of the Woods was built in 1732, putting the explorer in closer contact with the Sioux. The La Vérendrye's did not want war between tribes and La Colle was largely able to keep the peace. However, he led at least one war party in 1741 where many Sioux were killed and captured. Father Claude-Godefroy Coquart, who was wintering at Fort Kaministiquia, noted that more slaves than furs would be shipped to Montreal that season because of this event.

It would appear that La Colle played a significant role in protecting La Vérendrye during his exploration and trade westward.
