= Claude-Godefroy Coquart =

French missionary (1706–1765)

Claude-Godefroy Coquart (February 2, 1706 – July 4, 1765) was a Jesuit priest who probably arrived in Quebec in 1739. He was almost immediately assigned to accompany La Vérendrye to the western forts. He was to replace Father Jean-Pierre Aulneau who had died in the massacre on Lake of the Woods in 1736.

They left for the west in June, 1741 and Coquart was left at either Fort Michilimackinac or Fort Kaministiquia because of the riskiness of starting a new mission further west. We do know that he was aware of, and wrote about La Colle's raid on the Sioux of the Prairies in 1741. Coquart joined the La Vérendryes at Fort La Reine in 1743 and returned east when the Sieur de La Vérendrye lost the commandant post in 1744. He was the first recorded missionary in present-day Manitoba and the first to travel so far west.

== See also ==
- Jean-Pierre Aulneau
- Charles-Michel Mesaiger
