= Winnipeg River =

River in the Canadian provinces of Manitoba and Ontario

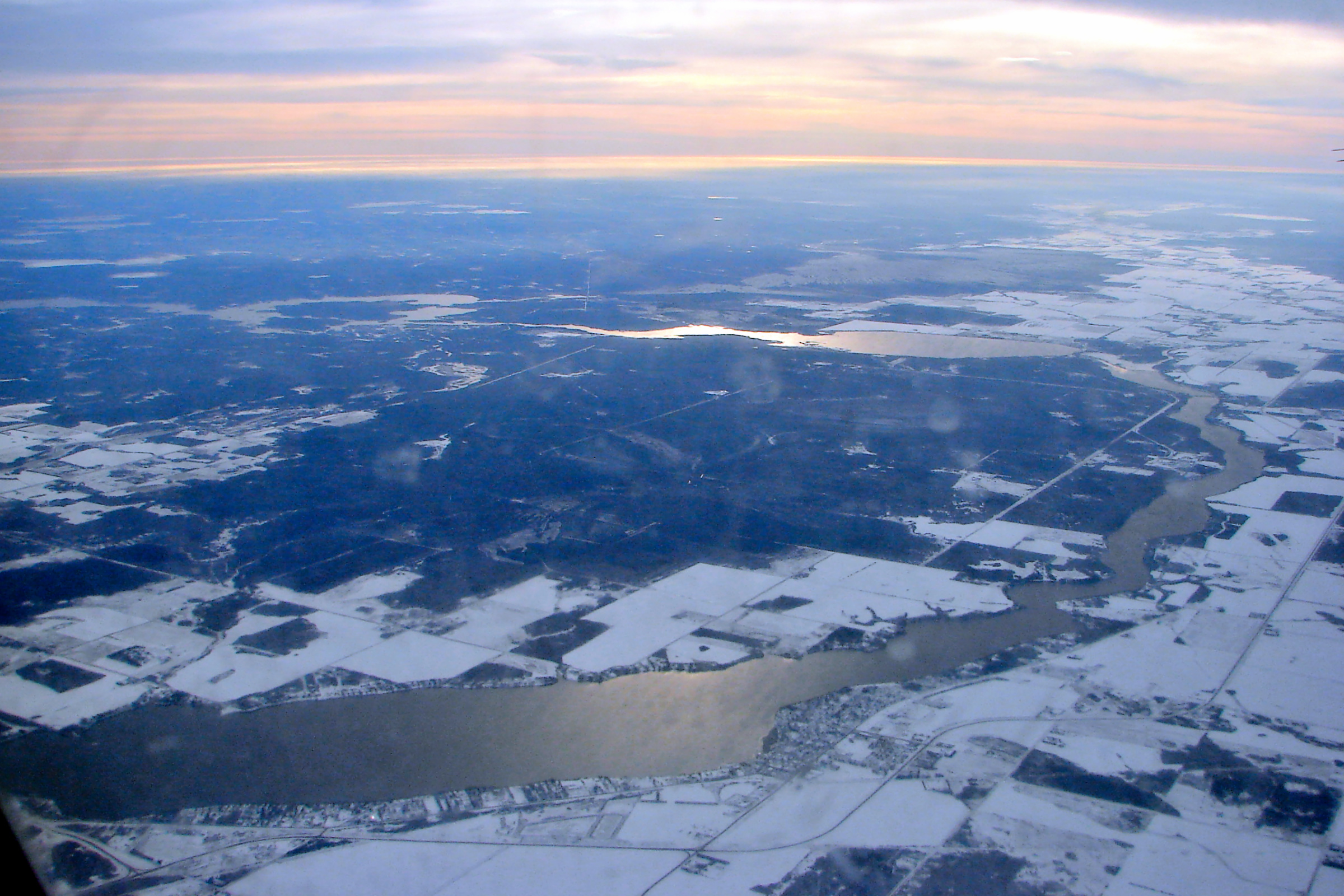
- Aerial view of Winnipeg River between Lac du Bonnet and Pinawa

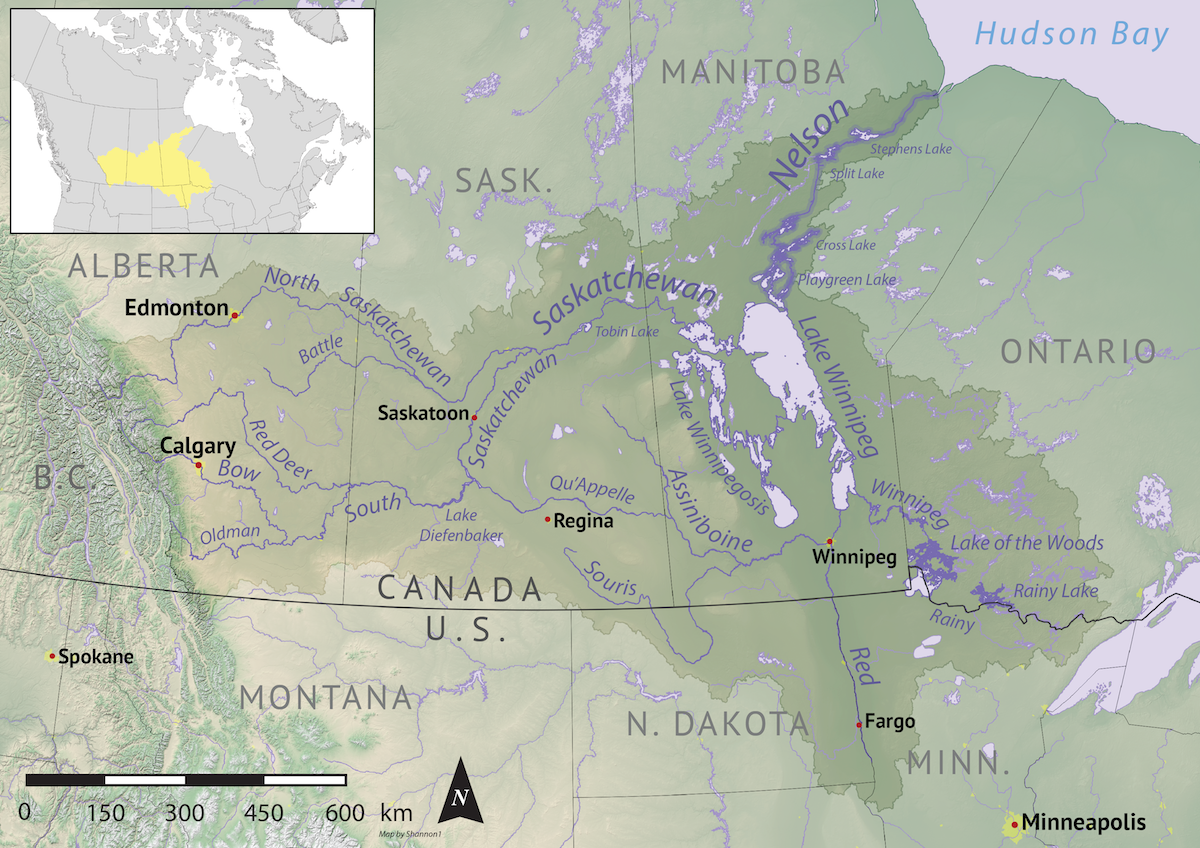
- Nelson River drainage basin

- Location of the mouth of the river in Manitoba; Lake of the Woods is the large lake at the bottom right of the shaded area. Winnipeg River (Canada)

Location
- Country: Canada
- Provinces: Manitoba; Ontario

Physical characteristics
- Source: Lake of the Woods
  - location: Kenora District, Ontario
  - coordinates: 49°46′18″N 94°31′27″W
  - elevation: 322 m (1,056 ft)
- Mouth: Lake Winnipeg
  - location: Manitoba
  - coordinates: 50°37′54″N 96°19′13″W
  - elevation: 217 m (712 ft)
- Length: 235 km (146 mi)
- Basin size: 106,500 km^{2} (41,100 sq mi)

Basin features
- River system: Nelson River

Winnipeg River is a Canadian river that flows roughly northwest from Lake of the Woods in the province of Ontario to Lake Winnipeg in Manitoba. This river is 235 kilometres (146 mi) long from the Norman Dam in Kenora to its mouth at Lake Winnipeg. Its watershed is 106,500 square kilometres (41,100 sq mi) in area, mainly in Canada. About 29,000 square kilometres (11,000 sq mi) of the watershed is in northern Minnesota, United States.

The Winnipeg River watershed was the southeasternmost portion of the land granted in 1670 to the Hudson's Bay Company. The portion in Canada corresponds roughly to the land deeded to Canada in Treaty 3, signed in 1873 by Her Majesty's treaty commissioners and the First Nation chiefs at Northwest Angle on the Lake of the Woods. The river's name means "murky water" in Cree.

This river route was used by natives for thousands of years before European contact. French and English colonists also began to use the river in order to reach First Nations for the fur trade, with trade interactions for hundreds of years. It is the only major water route between what is now Ontario and southern Manitoba that was easily navigable by canoe. The Red River route was much farther south and had a longer portage. La Vérendrye was one of the first explorers to establish fur trade forts near the First Nations camps along the river.

The river section through Whiteshell Provincial Park has many petroforms near the Whiteshell River forks where the two rivers meet. These petroforms are an ancient reminder of the importance of the area for native travel, trade, ceremonies, harvesting, and settlements.

Since 1906 the river has been an important source of hydroelectric power to the city of Winnipeg.

== Geography ==
The Winnipeg River watershed stretches to the height of land about 100 kilometres (62 mi) west of Lake Superior.

Major modern communities along the banks of the Winnipeg River include Kenora, Minaki and Whitedog in Ontario; and Lac du Bonnet, Pinawa, Powerview, and Pine Falls, all in Manitoba. Whitedog is the home of the Wabaseemoong First Nation. The Sagkeeng First Nation is located near the mouth of the Winnipeg River and Pine Falls.

In Ontario, dams were built on the Winnipeg River at Kenora, exiting Lake of the Woods, and at Whitedog Falls. Power from the dams have supplied Kenora and a local pulp and paper mill, while local Anishinaabe populations have been negatively impacted by consequent environmental degradation. In Manitoba, there are six hydroelectric dams: Pointe du Bois Generating Station at Pointe du Bois, Slave Falls a few kilometres downstream, Seven Sisters Generating Station at Seven Sisters Falls, MacArthur Falls Generating Station, Great Falls Generating Station, and Pine Falls Generating Station at Powerview, Manitoba.

Flows on the Winnipeg River are controlled through the various dams by the Lake of the Woods Control Board. It maintains a website with detailed descriptions of the river basin and water flow characteristics.

=== Tributaries ===
Major tributaries include the Black Sturgeon River, English River, Bird River, Lee River, Whiteshell River, Whitemouth River, and Macfarlane River.

Manitoba:

- Spence Creek
- Princes Creek
- Pine Creek
- Maskwa River
- Little Bear River
- Maple Creek
- North Coca-Cola Creek
- Sweet Creek
- Coppermine Creek
- Bird River
- Rice Creek
- Lee River
- Whitemouth River
- Big Creek
- Caribou Creek
- Picket Creek
- Whiteshell River
- Tie Creek
- Lauries Creek
- Walters Creek
- Greer Lake Creek
- Ryerson Creek
- Bloms Creek
- Crowduck Creek

Ontario:

- Turtle Creek
- Jadel Creek
- Scot River
- Sword Creek
- English River
- Whitedog River
- Alice Creek
- Dean Creek
- Macfarlane River
- Black Sturgeon River
- Culloden Creek
- War Eagle Creek

=== Lakes ===
Areas where the Winnipeg River widens markedly have been identified as lakes, including Gun, Roughrock and Sand lakes in Ontario; and Nutimik, Eleanor, Dorothy, Margaret, Natalie, and Lac du Bonnet, all in Manitoba. Nutimik, Dorothy, and Margaret lakes are all entirely within the Whiteshell Provincial Park.

- Lake of the Woods (source)
- Middle Lake, Ontario (Kenora)
- Gun Lake, Ontario
- Pistol Lake
- Little Sand Lake
- Big Sand Lake
- Roughrock Lake
- Swan Lake, Ontario (Kenora)
- Tetu Lake
- Numao Lake
- Nutimik Lake
- Margaret Lake, Manitoba
- Dorothy Lake
- Eleanor Lake
- Sylvia Lake, Manitoba
- Natalie Lake (lake)
- Lac du Bonnet (lake)
- Lake Winnipeg (mouth)

== Exploration and fur trade ==
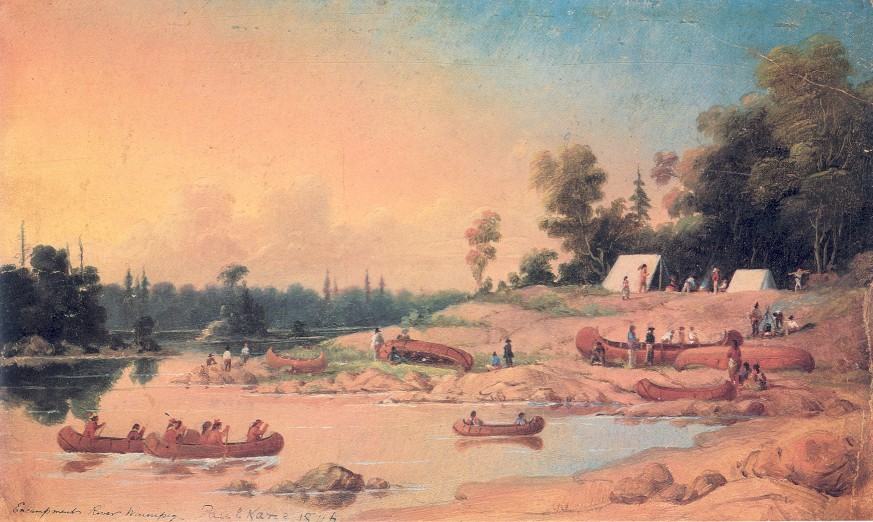
Encampment, Winnipeg River (1846), by Paul Kane

The Winnipeg River was the main route from the Great Lakes to Western Canada before the railroads were constructed in this area. After reaching Lake Winnipeg, a traveler could go by canoe as far as the Rocky Mountains, Arctic Ocean or Hudson Bay. This section covers the route from Lake Superior to Lake Winnipeg via Rainy Lake, the Rainy River, Lake of the Woods and the Winnipeg River. For the route in general, see Nelson River basin.

The area was too rocky to be good beaver country, as they needed a forested habitat. Grand Portage was the second-longest portage in Canada after Methye Portage. Once over the height of land, rivers led west to Rainy Lake and the Rainy River. Duncan M'Gillivray called the Rainy the 'most beautiful river in the north'. George Simpson and many others made similar comments.

The route went up the east side of Lake of the Woods and over the Rat Portage (Kenora) to the Winnipeg. The Winnipeg River was notorious for its many portages and décharges. Three were known as the Dales, Portage de l'Isle, and La Rivière Blanche, named for its white water. This last was the scene of many deaths. Its seven portages were all visible from the same spot. After the last portage, at Manitou Rapids, the river opened out into the Bas de la Rivière and then the lake. About halfway up the river, the English River led to Fort Albany on James Bay.

In 1679 Daniel Greysolon, Sieur du Lhut, reached the western tip of Lake Superior. In 1688 Jacques de Noyon went from Kaministiquia as far as Rainy Lake and perhaps beyond. He seems to have been followed by coureurs des bois, who may have gotten as far as Lake Winnipeg. They left no records, but the English on Hudson Bay heard reports of the coureurs in 1718 if not earlier. In 1717 Zacharie Robutel de La Noue tried and failed to penetrate the area.

Opening of the land west of Lake Superior by a European is credited to La Vérendrye in 1731–1743. In 1731 his men built a post on Rainy Lake. In 1732 he built Fort Saint Charles on Lake of the Woods. In 1733 one of his sons almost reached Lake Winnipeg but was blocked by ice. In 1734 two explorers reported that they had reached the south end of Lake Winnipeg, and La Vérendrye ordered the first Fort Maurepas to be built there soon after. By 1743 the French had reached the Assiniboine and Saskatchewan rivers and had sent explorers to present-day North Dakota and, probably, Wyoming in what is now the United States.

All this drew trade away from the Hudson's Bay Company. After the British conquest of Canada as part of its victory in the Seven Years' War, French traders were largely replaced by "pedlars" (as the HBC people called them) from Montreal. The pedlars soon formed the North West Company, which was capitalized by both English and Scots. From about 1775 the HBC began building competing posts in the interior, including one on the Rainy River. Competition ended in 1821 when the two companies merged and trade was diverted to York Factory on Hudson Bay. Trade was also diverted south as population grew on the United States side. The last major use of the route was by the Wolseley Expedition in 1870. After 1885 the Canadian Pacific Railway connected eastern and western Canada with a route north of Lake Superior.

Trading posts on the route were:

- Lake Superior: 1.Fort Kaministiquia (1717), later called Fort William, Ontario (NWC, 1803) and 2. Grand Portage with Fort Charlotte;
- Rainy River: Fort Saint Pierre (1731), Fort Lac la Pluie (NWC, circa 1780), Asp House (HBC 1794), Hungry Hall (HBC 1825);
- Lake of the Woods: Fort Saint Charles (1732);
- Winnipeg River Mouth:Fort Maurepas (Canada) (c 1739), Fort Bas de la Rivière (NWC, 1792), Fort Alexander (HBC, before 1800)

== See also ==
- La Vérendrye Trail
- List of longest rivers of Canada
- List of rivers of Ontario
- List of rivers of Manitoba
