= Bas de la Rivière =

Geographical area in Manitoba, Canada

Coordinates: 50.602°N 96.282°W

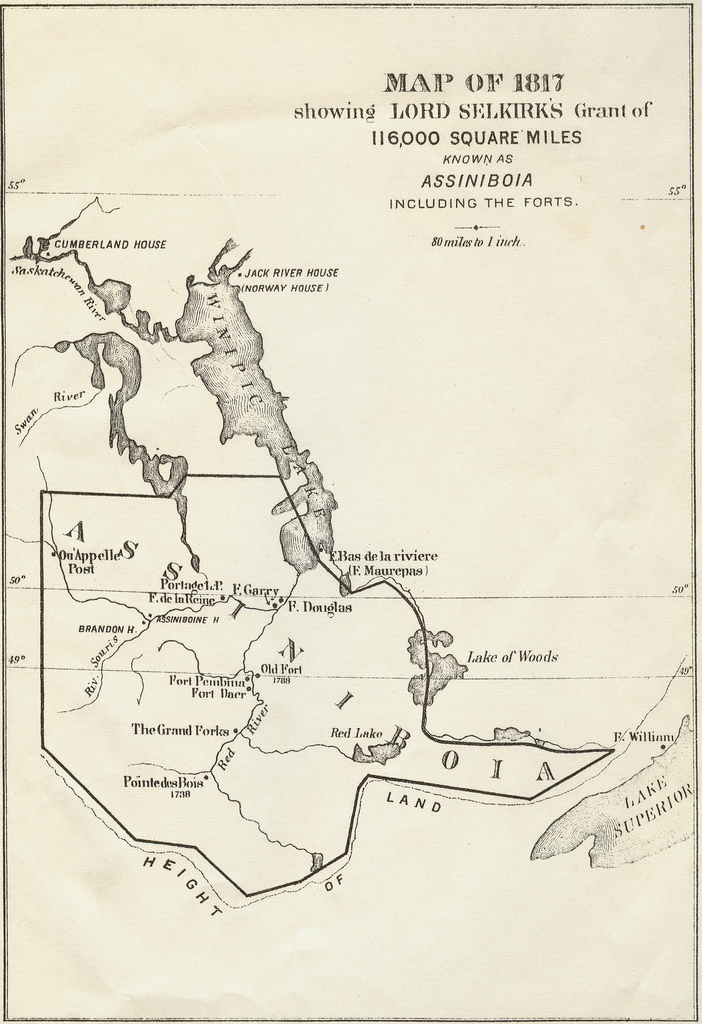
Map showing Fort Maurepas and Bas de la Rivière on the Winnipeg River.

Bas de la Rivière is a geographical area on both sides of the Winnipeg River at and near the mouth where it empties into Lake Winnipeg. It had a storied historical period in the opening of the west and the subsequent fur trade and settlement.

It is known that Jean Baptiste de La Vérendrye, Pierre Gaultier de La Vérendrye and their men, explored the area in 1733 and built Fort Maurepas on the Red River in 1734. They may have established a structure at Bas de la Rivière at that time. A second Fort Maurepas was located there shortly after the first was established on the Red River.

After the La Vérendrye era and the Seven Years' War there was a steady increase in trade and commerce at the location. A supply depot, fishery and farm all flourished there. A community of Cree had a large village there by 1775 when Alexander Henry the elder traded in the area. Certain records refer to Fort Bas de la Rivière as the headquarters of the North West Company in the Winnipeg River basin at the time of the fur wars.

== Fur trade posts ==
The area was strategic, as the Winnipeg River was the main route east to Montreal. From Lake Winnipeg one could go southwest to the Assiniboine River, northwest to the Saskatchewan River, and from there to Lake Athabasca or northeast up the Hayes River to Hudson Bay.

As such, the area was home to three posts: second Fort Maurepas (French, c. 1739), Fort Bas de la Rivière (NWC, 1792), and Fort Alexander (HBC, before 1800).

The second Fort Maurepas was built around c. 1739 on the north side of the river by some of La Vérendrye's men as part of his expansion west from Lake Superior. It was abandoned at an unknown date, perhaps in connection with the general French withdrawal during the French and Indian War.

Fort Bas de la Rivière was built in 1792 by Toussaint Le Sieur of the North West Company. It was on the south side of the river six miles below old Fort Maurepas. It was sometimes called Le Sieur's Fort.

Fort Alexander, founded by Alexander MacKay, was built before 1800 by the Hudson's Bay Company a few rods from the NWC post. It was supplied from Fort Albany on James Bay via the English River which took about 40 days in one direction and 80 days in the other. In 1800 Alexander Henry the younger said that the post had a clerk and two men and was not paying expenses. When the two companies were merged in 1821, the HBC post was closed and its operations moved to the NWC post which was now called Fort Alexander. When Nicholas Garry inspected the post in 1821 he noted that there were 50 women and children living there at company expense.

The forts were not proper trading posts where furs were collected but rather depots where goods were stored for shipment in either direction. After c. 1810, when pemmican production started in the buffalo country along the Assiniboine River, they were used to store pemmican to feed the voyageurs on their way to distant Lake Athabasca. There was some farming in the area. After the merger in 1821, the area became less important as trade was shifted from Montreal to York Factory on Hudson Bay.

Morton mentions the remains of an XY Company post across the river from the NWC post. He also mentions Jean Baptiste Adhemar who around 1780 had a post on the Assiniboine and supplied east-bound canoemen with pemmican at a place called Pemmican Point near the mouth of the Winnipeg. There is a monument near Fort Alexander, Manitoba which says that the forts were 'nearby'.
