= Pierre Gaultier de La Vérendrye =

Explorer and fur trader in Canada (1714–1755)

Pierre Gaultier de La Vérendrye de Boumois
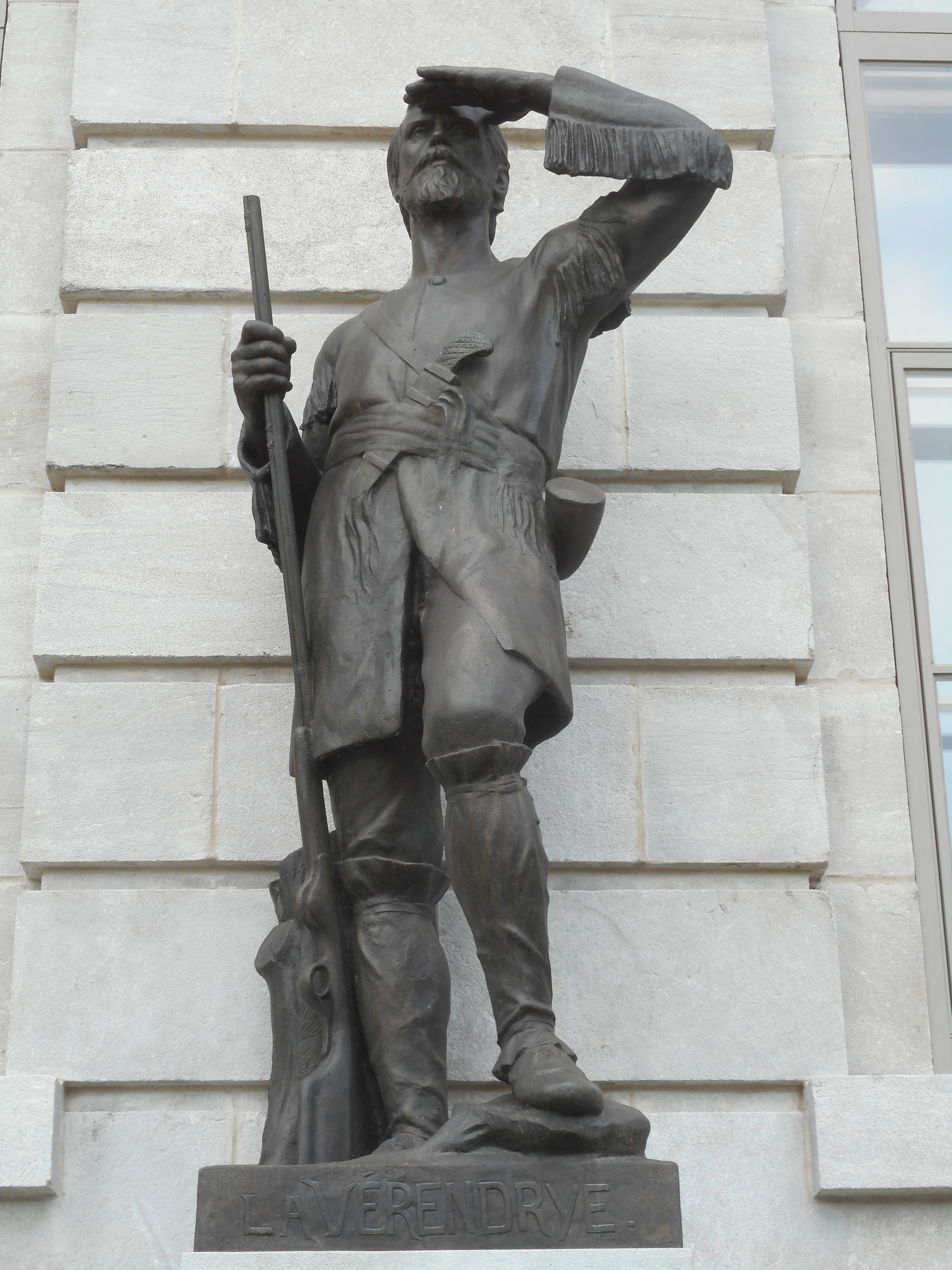
- Statue of Pierre Gaultier de Varennes et de La Vérendrye in front of the Quebec Parliament Building
- Born: Pierre Gaultier de La Vérendrye de Boumois; December 1, 1714; Île aux Vaches, near Sorel-Tracy, New France
- Died: September 13, 1755 (aged 40); Montreal, New France
- Occupations: Military officer, explorer, fur trader
- Known for: Participation in the La Vérendrye expeditions; commands at western posts such as Fort St. Charles and Fort La Reine
- Parent(s): Pierre Gaultier de Varennes, sieur de La Vérendrye and Marie-Anne Dandonneau du Sablé

Pierre Gaultier de La Vérendrye de Boumois (1 December 1714 – 13 September 1755) was a military officer, explorer, and fur trader in New France. The son of Pierre Gaultier de Varennes, sieur de La Vérendrye, he took part in his family's efforts to extend French influence across the northern plains and the Lake Winnipeg basin. Trained as a cadet in the colonial regular troops, La Vérendrye held commands at western posts such as Fort St. Charles and Fort La Reine, and in 1741 led an expedition that reached Spanish outposts on the central plains. He later served in the colonial military during the early years of the Seven Years' War and died in Montreal shortly after the fall of Fort Beauséjour in 1755.

== Early life ==
Pierre Gaultier de La Vérendrye de Boumois was born on 1 December 1714 on Île aux Vaches, (Isle of Cows), a small island near present-day Sorel-Tracy in New France. He was the second son of the explorer and military officer Pierre Gaultier de Varennes, sieur de La Vérendrye and Marie-Anne Dandonneau du Sable.

No documentation survives concerning his formal schooling. As a member of a military family in New France, he likely received the basic instruction common to young men of his social rank, including literacy, religious training, and preparation for service in the colonial forces. His earliest recorded training appears in his late teens, when he entered the colonial regular troops and spent two years as a cadet performing garrison duty in Montreal.

La Verendrye belonged to the Gaultier de Varennes family, a well established military household in New France. His father was a career officer involved in the expansion of French influence toward the western interior, and his mother came from a family active in the fur trade and local administration.

He was one of several brothers who took part in their father's exploratory and trading ventures. His elder brother Jean Baptiste de La Verendrye served in the construction and operation of western forts. Francois de La Verendrye and Louis-Joseph Gaultier de La Verendrye also undertook extensive travel and trading missions across the northern plains. Together, the family formed the core of the La Verendrye expeditions, which linked French posts from Lake Superior to the upper Missouri River.

== Expeditions with his father ==
In 1731, when his father planned an expedition to expand the fur trade westward and at the same time search for a water route to the Western Sea, he accompanied his father and brothers Jean Baptiste, François, and Louis-Joseph as a member of the expedition. He spent the winter at Fort Kaministiquia while his older brother Jean Baptiste and his cousin and the second in command, Christopher Dufrost de La Jemeraye, carried on to Rainy Lake and established Fort St. Pierre. In 1732 he accompanied his father to Lake of the Woods, where they built Fort St. Charles.

In the spring of 1734, after his father had left for Montreal, Pierre briefly was left in command of Fort St. Charles until relieved by La Jemeraye. In February 1737 Pierre accompanied his father to Fort Maurepas, and in June the two men left the west for Montreal and Quebec.

From August 1738 until November 1739, Pierre was entrusted with the command of Fort St. Charles while his father explored into the Mandan country north of the Missouri River.

== Independent expeditions ==
Starting out from Fort La Reine on the Assiniboine River and accompanied by two Frenchmen, he travelled south in 1741 as far as two Spanish forts, probably in present-day Nebraska, before turning back. He returned from this expedition with two horses and some articles of Spanish make. These are the first two horses of historical record in what is now Manitoba.

Later the same year when his father returned from the east in October Pierre was sent to build Fort Dauphin near present-day Winnipegosis, Manitoba. His mission completed, Pierre invited the Crees and Assiniboins to bring their furs from then on to the new fort, then he returned to Fort La Reine where he spent the entire year of 1742.

== Later career ==
Pierre Gaultier de La Vérendrye was active as a fur-trader and explorer in the west even after his father was relieved of his command in 1744 up to 1749 when he finally returned east and re-entered the army. He was active at Fort Beauséjour where he served until it was captured by the British in 1755.

== Death ==
After the capitulation of Fort Beauséjour in June 1755, La Vérendrye returned east in poor health. He reached Montreal later that summer and died there on 13 September 1755 at the age of 40.
