= Maurepas =

Maurepas may refer to:

- Jean Frédéric Phélypeaux, Count of Maurepas, French statesman Count of Maurepas (Yvelines)
- Fort Maurepas, also known as Old Biloxi, a settlement in Louisiana (New France)
- Maurepas, Louisiana, an unincorporated community in the United States
- Lake Maurepas, a lake in Louisiana, United States
- Fort Maurepas (Canada), a fort in Manitoba
- Maurepas, Somme, a French commune in the Somme département
- Maurepas, Yvelines, a French commune in the Yvelines département, the place of origin of Jean Frédéric Phélypeaux and all namesakes of Maurepas.
