= Fort Paskoya =

Museum near The Pas, Manitoba, Canada

Coordinates: 53.507°N 100.651°W

- Established: 1741 -1742
- Location: near The Pas, Manitoba, Canada
- Type: historic site

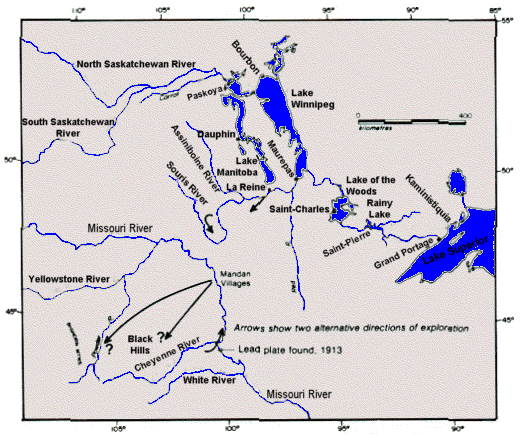
A map of the area of operations of the La Vérendrye family.

Fort Paskoya (or Paskoyac or Pasquia) was a French fort and trading post on the lower Saskatchewan River above Cedar Lake.

It was named after a Cree word for 'narrows', or after the Opaskwayak Cree Nation, whom the explorers encountered. "Paskoyac" was also an old name for the Saskatchewan River. There is also a Pasquia River at The Pas.

== History ==
Around 1740, Pierre Gaultier de Varennes, sieur de La Vérendrye built four forts to control the chain of lakes west of Lake Winnipeg. These were Fort Pascoya, Fort Bourbon, Fort Dauphin, and Fort La Reine. Their purpose was to trade in furs and to divert to Montreal furs that had previously gone to the English on Hudson Bay. Pascoya had a good location because most of the furs from the west and northwest came down the Saskatchewan. The forts were also part of a quest for a river that led to the western sea, which Verendrye now thought was the Saskatchewan.

First Paskoya: In 1740 Louis-Joseph Gaultier de La Vérendrye mapped the west side of Cedar Lake. During the winter of 1741-42, the elder La Vérendrye decided to build a fort on a small island where the river discharges into Cedar Lake. This post soon became a minor outpost of the first Fort Bourbon. The second Fort Bourbon was probably built nearby.

Second Paskoya: The second Fort Paskoya was built upstream at what is now The Pas. Morton believes it was built in 1750 and first occupied by Joseph-Claude Boucher, Chevalier de Niverville. In 1753 or 1754, it was strengthened by Louis de la Corne, Chevalier de la Corne. In 1754, it was visited by Anthony Henday who described it as a "hogstye". Henday's visit is the only recorded visit by a British explorer or trader to any French fort west of Lake Superior, up to the close of French rule in Canada.

It was closed in 1759 during the fall of New France.

In 1775, Alexander Henry the elder was blocked near here by a chief called The Pelican who demanded tribute to continue up the river. About the same time the Frobishers had a single trader on the site. The North West Company seems to have had a post here that was taken over by the Hudson's Bay Company.
