= Charles-Michel Mesaiger =

Jesuit priest (1689–1766)

Charles-Michel Mesaiger (7 March 1689 – 7 August 1766) was a French Jesuit priest who spent some time in missionary work in present-day Canada.

Mesaiger arrived in Canada in 1722 and spent a number of years in the mission to the Ottawas at Michilimackinac. He subsequently became a chaplain to the French and joined Pierre Gaultier de Varennes et de La Vérendrye and his party as they began a serious exploration of the land to the west of Fort Kaministiquia. He was instrumental in sending out the first party which built Fort St. Pierre on Rainy Lake in 1731. In 1732, he accompanied the la Vérendryes to that fort and beyond to Lake of the Woods where they built Fort St. Charles.

Poor health forced Mesaiger to return to the east in 1733. He had influenced the beginning of the La Vérendrye explorations which would continue to push westward. He also became the first missionary to travel this far west. His replacement, Jean-Pierre Aulneau, was to become a martyr in carrying on the mission that Mesaiger had started.
