= Fort Bourbon =

Coordinates: 53.1857°N 99.2625°W

- at Grand Rapids, Manitoba where the Saskatchewan River enters Lake Winnipeg

Site information
- Controlled by: France

Site history
- Built: 1741
- In use: 1741-1758

Fort Bourbon was one of the forts built by La Vérendrye during his expansion of trade and exploration west from Lake Superior. Besides providing support for the important fur trade in what is now Manitoba, La Vérendrye wanted to conduct exploration of potential routes for what he believed was an interior western sea.

The name "Fort Bourbon" was also given to York Factory while it was occupied by the French.

First Fort Bourbon was at the mouth of the Saskatchewan River on Lake Winnipeg. The youngest La Vérendrye son, Louis-Joseph Gaultier de La Vérendrye, led an initial exploration to the area in 1737. An epidemic of smallpox thwarted the mission. In 1740 Louis-Joseph had a successful trip exploring the Saskatchewan River to a short distance west of Cedar Lake and mapping the site for the first Fort Paskoya at the west end of Cedar Lake. On his return toward Lake Winnipeg, he mapped the area and established a site for the first Fort Bourbon. The map of 1740 indicated a site between the Grand Rapids and Lake Winnipeg, on the northern shore of the Saskatchewan or White River. In 1741, the elder La Vérendrye sent an expedition of men to establish the fort.

Second Fort Bourbon: Fort Bourbon was moved upstream at an uncertain date. It was probably at the inflow of the Saskatchewan into Cedar Lake, the same location as first Fort Paskoya. In 1758, when the French withdrew from the west during the Seven Years' War (French and Indian War), it was plundered and burned. In 1777, Todd & McGill had a post about a mile and a half upstream.
