= Fort Maurepas (Canada) =

Name of two historic forts in Canada

Coordinates: 50.648°N 96.557°W

- On the Red River, St. Andrews RM, north of Selkirk, Manitoba, Canada

Site information
- Type: Fur trade

Site history
- Built: 1734

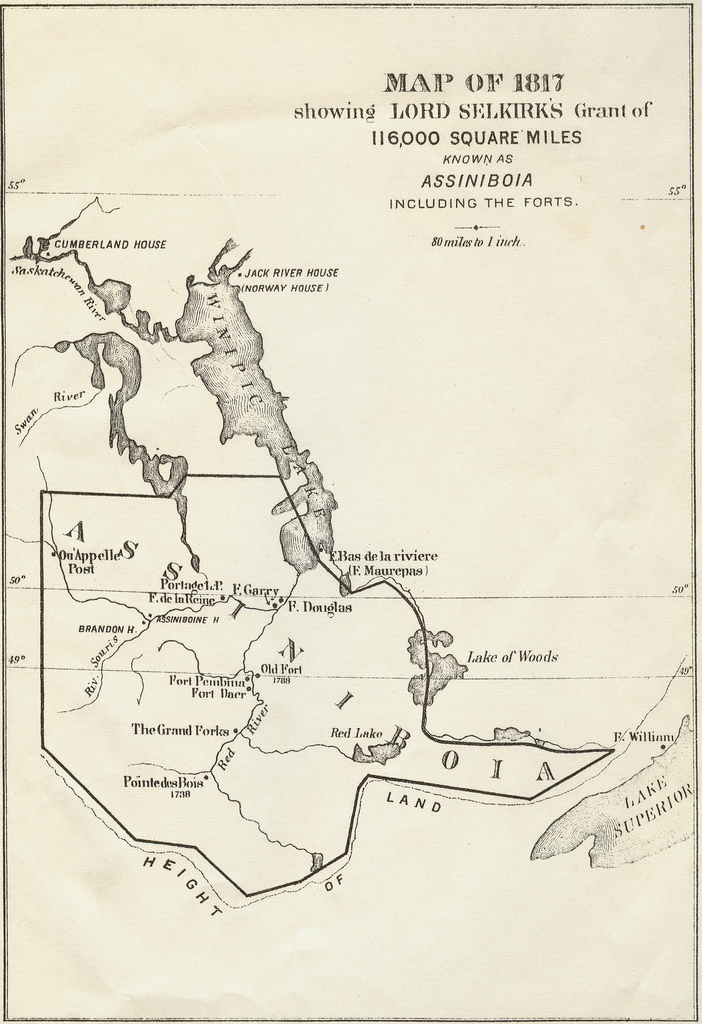
Map of the Red River Colony showing Fort Maurepas

Fort Maurepas was the name of two forts, or one fort in two locations, built by the French in the Lake Winnipeg area in the 1730s:

- First Fort Maurepas (Red River)
- Second Fort Maurepas (Winnipeg River)

They were both named after Jean-Frédéric Phélypeaux, Count of Maurepas (from the city of Maurepas) who, as Minister of Marine, was in charge of French colonies and chief adviser to King Louis XVI.

== First Fort Maurepas (Red River) ==
In 1734, two explorers returned from Lake Winnipeg to Fort Saint Charles on Lake of the Woods and reported that they had found a good site for a fort near the mouth of Red River of the North, or Maurepas River as they called it. While returning to Montreal, La Vérendrye sent from Fort Kaministiquia Sieur Cartier, a merchant, with 12 men in 3 canoes to build a fort on the river. When he reached Fort Michilimackinac he ordered La Jemeraye to relieve his son Pierre at Fort Saint Charles so that Pierre assist at the new post. Since his son Jean-Baptiste had returned from the Indians, Jean-Baptiste went instead. The fort was five leagues up the Red River on high ground where the marshes end. The site has not been identified. Morton believes it was on Netley Creek which was called Riviére Aux Morts from a massacre of Saulteurs by the Sioux.

They explored the river from Lake Winnipeg almost to Pembina, North Dakota and opened a route from the Red River to Lake of the Woods via the Roseau River (Manitoba-Minnesota) and the Portage de la Savanne. In 1735 the fort produced 600 packages of furs. La Vérendrye himself arrived in February 1737 after travelling overland and held council with the Indians. In May 1737 it was reported that all the Indians at the fort had died of pox. In 1738 La Vérendrye returned, passing the fort on his way to found Fort La Reine on the Assiniboine River. By 1739 the fort was abandoned in favor of Fort Rouge upriver (south) at the present site of Winnipeg.

== Second Fort Maurepas (Winnipeg River) ==
The Second Fort Maurepas (Winnipeg River) is poorly documented. One source says that the fort was moved from the Red River to the Winnipeg River in 1739, but other sources do not repeat this. It was on a high round knoll on the right bank of the Winnipeg River about six miles above its mouth across from the modern Powerview-Pine Falls, Manitoba. In the winter of 1749-50 it was rebuilt by Pierre Gaultier de La Vérendrye after it had been burnt by the Indians. By 1793 nothing was visible but the clearing. On the opposite side of the river at Otter Point the North West Company had a storehouse. About two miles downriver was Fort Bas de la Rivière and further downriver was the later Fort Alexander, Manitoba. The region was known as Bas de la Rivière.
