= Angle Inlet, Minnesota =

Unincorporated community in Minnesota, US

Angle Inlet
- Census-designated place
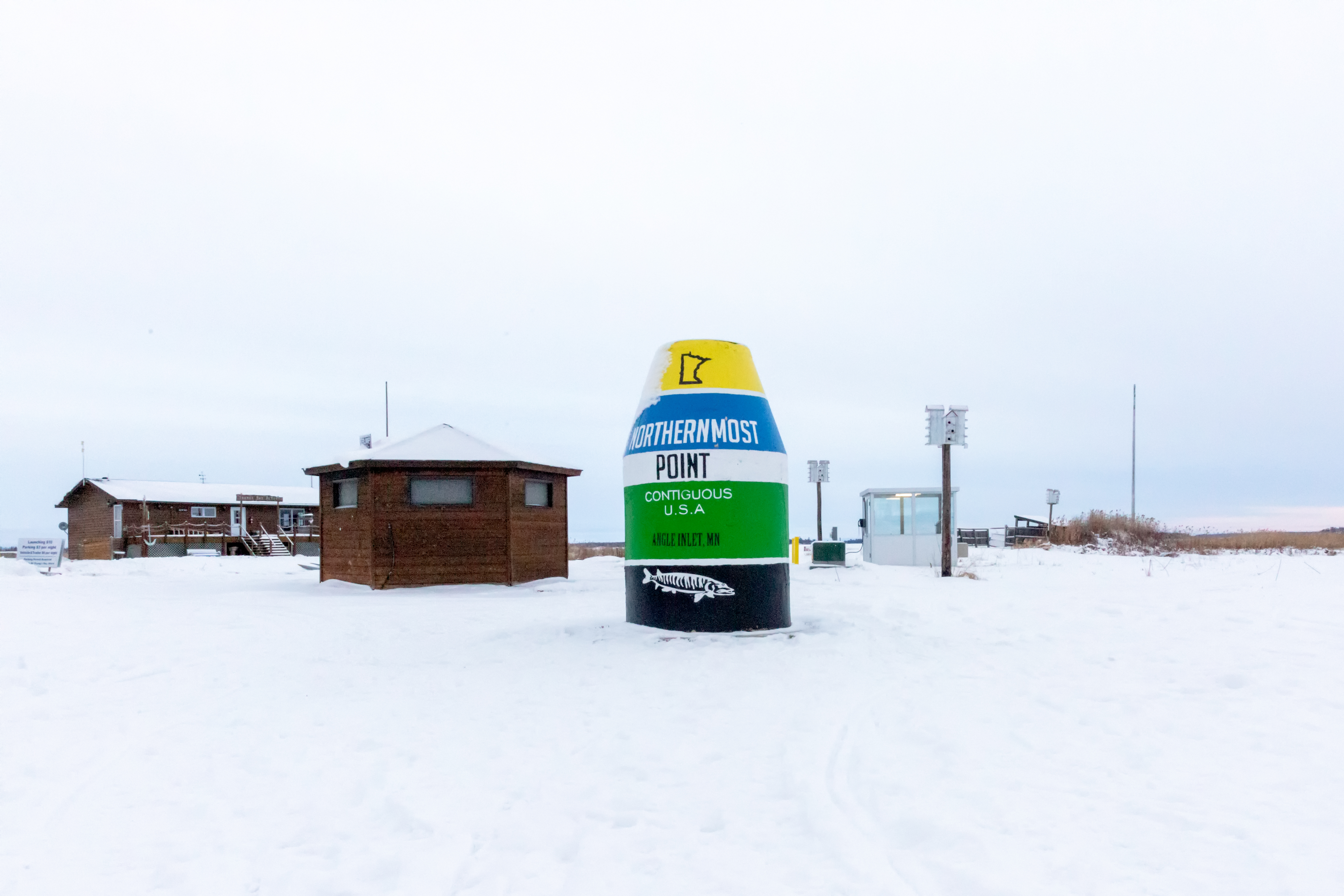
- Northernmost Point of the Contiguous U.S. landmark in Angle Inlet

- Location within the state of Minnesota Location within the United States
- Coordinates: 49°20′42″N 95°4′12″W
- Country: United States
- State: Minnesota
- County: Lake of the Woods
- Township: Angle

Area
  - Total: 2.03 sq mi (5.25 km^{2})
  - Land: 1.74 sq mi (4.50 km^{2})
  - Water: 0.29 sq mi (0.75 km^{2})
- Elevation: 1,063 ft (324 m)

Population (2020)
  - Total: 54
  - Density: 31/sq mi (12/km^{2})
- Time zone: UTC-6 (Central (CST))
  - Summer (DST): UTC-5 (CDT)
- ZIP Code: 56711
- Area code: 218
- GNIS feature ID: 639371

Angle Inlet is a census-designated place (CDP) and unincorporated community in Angle Township, Lake of the Woods County, Minnesota, United States. Its population was 54 as of the 2020 census. The community is part of the Northwest Angle, the only place in the contiguous United States north of the 49th parallel; it is the northernmost census-designated place in the contiguous United States. Fort Saint Charles, built by French explorers in 1732, is nearby on Magnuson's Island.

Angle Inlet has the last active one-room school in Minnesota and a post office with a sign stating that it is the "Most Northerly P.O. in Contiguous U.S." Angle Inlet is only accessible year-round by paved road from Manitoba, Canada, with an ice road connecting the town to the United States built when conditions allow in the winter.

The town's economy is built around tourism - mainly fishing, ice fishing, snowmobiling, and boating. Its location on Lake of the Woods provides access for fishermen seeking walleye, crappie, lake trout, and northern pike.

The inlet also has a small air strip serviced by Lake Country Air.

== Demographics ==
According to the United States Census Bureau, Angle Inlet had a population of 60 at the 2020 census. The community’s population has fluctuated slightly over recent decades due to its remote location and seasonal economy.

Of the total population, the 2020 Census reported 100% identifying as White, with 5.0% identifying as Hispanic or Latino (of any race). The median age was 47.2 years, and approximately 35% of residents were aged 45 to 64.

Households in Angle Inlet were predominantly owner-occupied, with an average household size of 2.0 persons. Seasonal homes and lodges make up a significant portion of local housing stock, reflecting the area’s reliance on tourism and outdoor recreation.

== Climate ==
Angle Inlet has a warm-summer humid continental climate (Dfb), with a plant hardiness zone of 3B with an average annual extreme minimum temperature of −32.6 °F (−35.9 °C). Due to its high latitude and its location near the center of the North American continent, the community experiences one of the most extreme winters in the contiguous United States.

There is no weather station in the area, but the PRISM Climate Group, a project of Oregon State University, provides interpolated data for the area based on the climates of nearby areas.

Climate data for Angle Inlet, MN. Elev: 1,079 ft (329 m)
Month	Jan	Feb	Mar	Apr	May	Jun	Jul	Aug	Sep	Oct	Nov	Dec	Year
Mean maximum °F (°C)	36.4 (2.4)	37.6 (3.1)	51.4 (10.8)	67.1 (19.5)	79.3 (26.3)	84.7 (29.3)	86.2 (30.1)	85.4 (29.7)	80.7 (27.1)	69.4 (20.8)	51.2 (10.7)	37.1 (2.8)	89.1 (31.7)
Mean daily maximum °F (°C)	12.9 (−10.6)	18.0 (−7.8)	31.8 (−0.1)	46.5 (8.1)	60.8 (16.0)	70.6 (21.4)	76.1 (24.5)	74.3 (23.5)	64.4 (18.0)	49.0 (9.4)	32.4 (0.2)	18.4 (−7.6)	46.3 (7.9)
Daily mean °F (°C)	3.3 (−15.9)	7.2 (−13.8)	21.2 (−6.0)	36.9 (2.7)	51.5 (10.8)	62.2 (16.8)	66.6 (19.2)	64.9 (18.3)	55.2 (12.9)	41.5 (5.3)	25.6 (−3.6)	10.5 (−11.9)	37.2 (2.9)
Mean daily minimum °F (°C)	−6.3 (−21.3)	−3.6 (−19.8)	10.6 (−11.9)	27.4 (−2.6)	42.2 (5.7)	53.8 (12.1)	57.1 (13.9)	55.6 (13.1)	46.0 (7.8)	33.9 (1.1)	18.8 (−7.3)	2.5 (−16.4)	28.2 (−2.1)
Mean minimum °F (°C)	−30.6 (−34.8)	−26.4 (−32.4)	−15.4 (−26.3)	12.0 (−11.1)	28.7 (−1.8)	41.6 (5.3)	46.6 (8.1)	44.7 (7.1)	32.7 (0.4)	20.6 (−6.3)	−0.2 (−17.9)	−22.0 (−30.0)	−32.6 (−35.9)
Average precipitation inches (mm)	0.73 (19)	0.62 (16)	0.86 (22)	1.33 (34)	3.00 (76)	4.17 (106)	3.55 (90)	3.01 (76)	3.03 (77)	2.27 (58)	1.04 (26)	0.95 (24)	24.57 (624)
Average relative humidity (%)	82.9	81.7	74.6	63.3	63.9	71.3	74.7	74.3	76.4	76.3	83.1	85.0	74.9
Average dew point °F (°C)	−0.7 (−18.2)	2.8 (−16.2)	14.4 (−9.8)	25.6 (−3.6)	39.7 (4.3)	52.8 (11.6)	58.3 (14.6)	56.5 (13.6)	47.9 (8.8)	34.6 (1.4)	21.2 (−6.0)	6.9 (−13.9)	30.0 (−1.1)
Source: PRISM Climate Group
