= Verendrye brothers' journey to the Rocky Mountains =

Expedition in North America

The Vérendrye brothers were trappers, hunters, and explorers, who were possibly the first Europeans to cross the northern Great Plains and see the Rocky Mountains, during an expedition in 1742–1743. What little is known about their journey comes from a journal found in the French archives in 1851 and an inscribed lead plate commemorating the journey which was found buried near Pierre, South Dakota in 1913. Both the journal and plate are difficult to interpret. The journal states the trip may have been made by the "Chevalier Vérendrye and one of his brothers", who are otherwise unidentified. Most likely the Chevalier was Louis-Joseph Gaultier de La Vérendrye and the brother was François de La Vérendrye, but this remains uncertain. The mountains they saw during the expedition may have been the Big Horn Mountains of Wyoming, but could also have been the Black Hills or the Laramie Mountains.

== Background ==
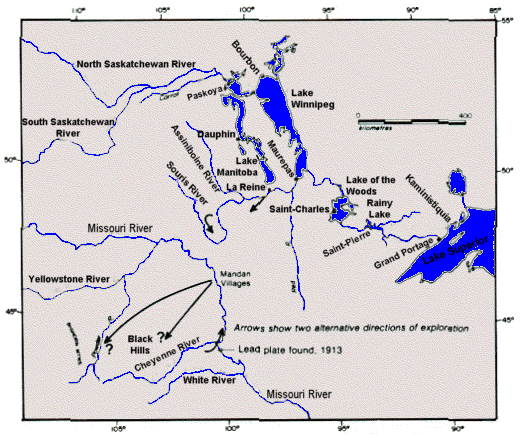
A map of the area of operations of the La Vérendrye family

The French founded Quebec City in 1608 and soon built a fur trade empire throughout the Saint Lawrence River basin. From about 1690, they expanded southwest into the Mississippi River basin hoping to bottle up the English along the Atlantic coast. In 1720, the Spanish Villasur expedition left Santa Fe (in modern day New Mexico) to contact the French, but was defeated by the Pawnee in Nebraska. In 1739 the first European crossing of the Great Plains was made by Pierre Antoine and Paul Mallet who travelled from the Mississippi River to Santa Fe.

From 1730, Pierre Gaultier de Varennes, sieur de La Vérendrye, the elder Vérendrye, and his four sons began pushing French trade and exploration west from Lake Superior out onto the Canadian prairies. In 1738, the elder Vérendrye and two of his sons left Fort La Reine (modern Portage la Prairie, Manitoba) at the south end of Lake Manitoba reached the Mandan country in North Dakota on the upper Missouri River. He was looking for a rumored "River of the West" that was thought to flow into the Pacific Ocean. He was told that it would take all summer to reach the lower part of the river and that there one could find men like Frenchmen who wore armor and rode horses. (Note: In his journal Vérendrye did not try to guess whether these people were French, Spanish or something else. He was told that the lower river was very broad and flowed to the southwest.) He left two men to learn the language (December 1738). Next year (September 1739), they reported back that every summer the Horse People (Gens du Chevaux) visited the Mandans to trade. The Horse People said that they knew of bearded white men to the west who lived in stone houses and prayed to the "great master of life" while holding what looked like husks of corn [books]. (Note: The first part of this paragraph comes from the elder Vérendrye's journal which can be found in Smith (1980). The "two men's" report comes from an extract of a lost Vérendrye journal sent to Paris by Governor-General Charles de la Boische, Marquis de Beauharnois. The only English translation of this seems to be Burpee (1915) which is out of print. See Smith (1980), notes 3 and 4 to Chapter 4.) In 1741 the younger Pierre and another son again visited the Mandans, but we have no details. In 1743 he sent two sons to discover the "Sea of the West".

== Vérendrye brothers' journey to the Rocky Mountains ==
It is difficult to link Vérendrye's journal to modern geographic and tribal names. Since their astrolabe was broken there are no latitudes recorded. This section summarizes the Vérendrye journal. Interpretations by later commentators are in the footnotes.

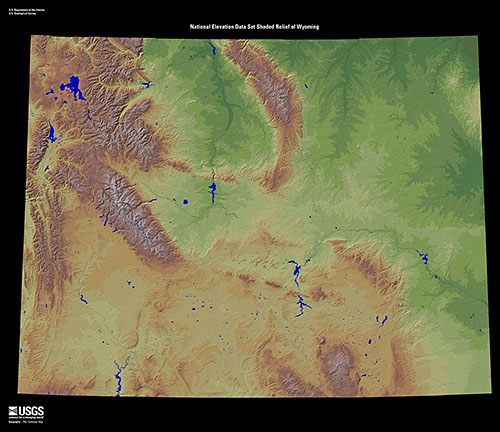
Relief map of Wyoming. The Vérendryes reached either the Big Horn Mountains, the Laramie Mountains or the Black Hills. The Big Horns are in the north Center. To the west is the Big Horn Basin and then the Yellowstone country. The Laramies are a projection of the Colorado Rockies on the south. The North Platte is barely visible north of the Laramies. The Black Hills are just east of the map.

On 29 April 1742, the Chevalier Vérendrye, his brother and two other Frenchmen left Fort La Reine. They reached the Mandan village on 19 May. There they waited for two months for the Horse People. When they did not show up, they found two Mandan guides and, on 23 July, departed and marched for twenty days west southwest through a land with multi-colored soils, seeing many animals but no people. (Note: This sounds like the Badlands along the Little Missouri River (North Dakota). Horses were not yet common on the northern plains so their baggage and trade goods may have been hauled on travois by dogs.)

On 11 August, they reached "the mountain of the Horse People". (Note: Smith (1980) proposed that this was White Butte, North Dakota. He thought that it was at the right distance, but Smurr claimed it was too close for a 20-day journey and suggested one of several small peaks in southeastern Montana, 250 to 300 miles (400 to 480 km) from the Mandan villages, or the highly distinctive Devil's Tower in Wyoming.) Since the guides would go no further they built a camp and lit signal fires. A month later, on 14 September, they saw smoke on the horizon and contacted the Handsome People (Beaux Hommes) (Note: Perhaps Crow or Blackfeet.) and stayed with them for 21 days. On 9 October they headed south southwest with a Beau Homme guide. On 11 October they meet the Little Foxes (Petits Renards) (Note: possibly a branch of the Cheyennes) and on 15 October the Pioya. (Note: Kiowa?)

On 19 October, they reached the Horse People. These were in distress because all their villages had been destroyed by the Snake People (Gens du Serpent). Two years before the Snake People had destroyed seventeen villages, killed the men and old women and taken the young women to be sold on the seacoast. The Horse People said that they had never been to the sea since the route was blocked by the Snake People. They suggested going to the Bow People (Gens de l'Arc) who were said to be the only tribe brave enough to fight the Snakes. After staying with the Horse People for a number of days, they marched southwest meeting the Gens de la Belle-Riviere on 18 November. (Note: If this was the upper Belle Fourche River they would have been west of the Black Hills. La Vérendrye commented that the "nations of these regions have a great many horses, asses, and mules -- apparently in contrast to the Mandans and other peoples they had met further north. Note the large number of different tribes met in the period 9 October to 21 November which implies that they had left the Badlands.)

They reached the Bow people on 21 November. The Bow chief said he knew of the "French on the sea coast" and said they had many slaves who were happy and did not run away. They had officers and priests and used horses to work the land. He spoke a few words of their language which Vérendrye recognized as Spanish. The Bow people were also familiar with the destruction of the Villasur expedition twenty years before. (Note: Villasur and his men had been killed by Pawnee.) (Note: Some identify the Bow people as Cheyenne who were certainly warlike. Others say Pawnee. The Bow chief had a large lodge which implies a non-nomadic people. Given that the Frenchmen drifted south southwest for six weeks between 9 October and 21 November, it is possible that they had reached the North Platte River north of the Laramie mountains. The Pawnee had large farming villages along the Loup River in Central Nebraska east of Wyoming and south of the Black Hills and expeditions for hunting and war westward into Wyoming were not unlikely. The Snakes were "almost certainly" either the Shoshoni or, less probably, their close relatives the Comanche. Both tribes, by virtue of acquiring horses earlier than many other Indians, had emerged recently from the Rocky Mountains to become powers on the Great Plains.)

The Bow people were marching toward the "great mountains near the sea" in order to fight the Snake People. They marched sometimes south-southwest and sometimes northwest gathering more fighters as they went. Soon there were over 2,000 warriors in addition to their families. On 1 January 1743, they came in sight of the mountains and continued marching through magnificent prairies with many wild animals. On 9 January, the warriors left the women and children and baggage behind in camp. The Chevalier's brother stayed to guard the baggage. On the "twelfth day" they reached the mountains which were well wooded and apparently very high. (Note: The 12-day difference might mean that they sighted the Laramies and reached the Big Horns, or the reverse.) Scouts returned and reported that they had found a Snake village which had been hastily abandoned. This caused consternation since many assumed that the Snakes had detected them and had left to attack their camp while the warriors were away. The chief tried to stop them but most headed back for the camp to protect their women and children. The entire war party broke up and retreated and the Chevalier had no choice but to follow. The Chevalier says that he reached the Bow village on 9 February, "the second day of our return journey". (Note: It is difficult to explain this discrepancy in time; possibly he meant "tenth (dixième) day" rather than "second (deuxième) day.") There was no further sign of the Snake People.

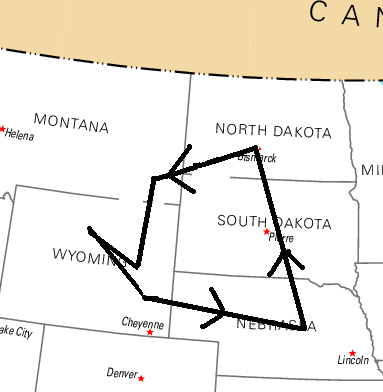
A conjectural map of the possible route of the Vérendrye expedition, 1742-1743

The assembled tribes broke up into smaller groups "to obtain meat more easily." The brothers remained with the Bow People until 1 March, traveling east-southeast. (Note: If the Bow People were Pawnee, they were heading for the Pawnee villages in Nebraska.) One Frenchman and a guide were sent ahead to contact the Little Cherry People (Gens de la Petite Cerise, possibly Chokecherry People). (Note: probably the Arikara. It is not clear how Vérendrye learned of them.) Ten days later the Frenchman returned with an invitation to join these people. On 15 March they reached the Chokecherry People who were returning to their fort on the Missouri River. At the fort they met a man who had been brought up among the Spanish who said that they were twenty days away by horseback, but the journey was dangerous because of the Snake People. (Note: Comanches?) They also heard of a Frenchman who was living three days journey away. (Note: This is possible since a number of Frenchmen are known to have travelled part way up the Missouri.) On 30 March they buried a lead plate recording their journey. (Note: This was found at Pierre, South Dakota in 1913, thereby fixing the location of the Chokecherry village, the only certain point on their entire journey.)

They left Pierre on 2 April. On the ninth they met twenty-five families of the Glued Arrow People (Gens de la Flêche Collée) or "Sioux of the Prairies." (Note: Some writers have identified these Indians as Cheyenne, known to live near the Missouri River at this time, rather than Sioux.) They reached the Mandans on 18 May. On the 27th they joined a party of about 100 Assiniboine who were going to Fort La Reine. On the 31st they were ambushed by a Sioux war party which quickly withdrew because of the many Assiniboines and the French guns. They reached "the village near the mountain" on 2 June, rested their horses until the 20th and reached Fort La Reine on 2 July 1743.

Since they had not found a route to the Pacific nor a profitable source of furs, their journey was not followed up. The French continued to have some contact with the Mandans. Lewis and Clark met Toussaint Charbonneau there in 1804.

== Problems ==
The Vérendrye journals were found in the French archives in 1851 by Pierre Margry. (He was, among other things, Francis Parkman's agent in the French archives.) The first journal describes the elder Vérendrye's journey to the Mandans and the second "the Expedition of the Chevalier de la Vérendrye and one of his brothers to reach the Sea of the West." The brothers are otherwise unnamed. The Dictionary of Canadian Biography gives some evidence for Louis-Joseph as the Chevalier and François for the brother. Hubert Smith reverses the two brothers but offers no evidence. Burpee has Pierre as the Chevalier. Other writers are careful to say Vérendrye's sons without being specific. In his journal of the first expedition the elder Vérendrye four times speaks of 'my son the chevalier' without saying which one. (Note: One son remained at Fort la Riene. The Smith (1980), p. 42 translation has youngest son and the Flandrau (1925), p. 24 translation has eldest son - a useful reminder that standard sources are not always reliable.)

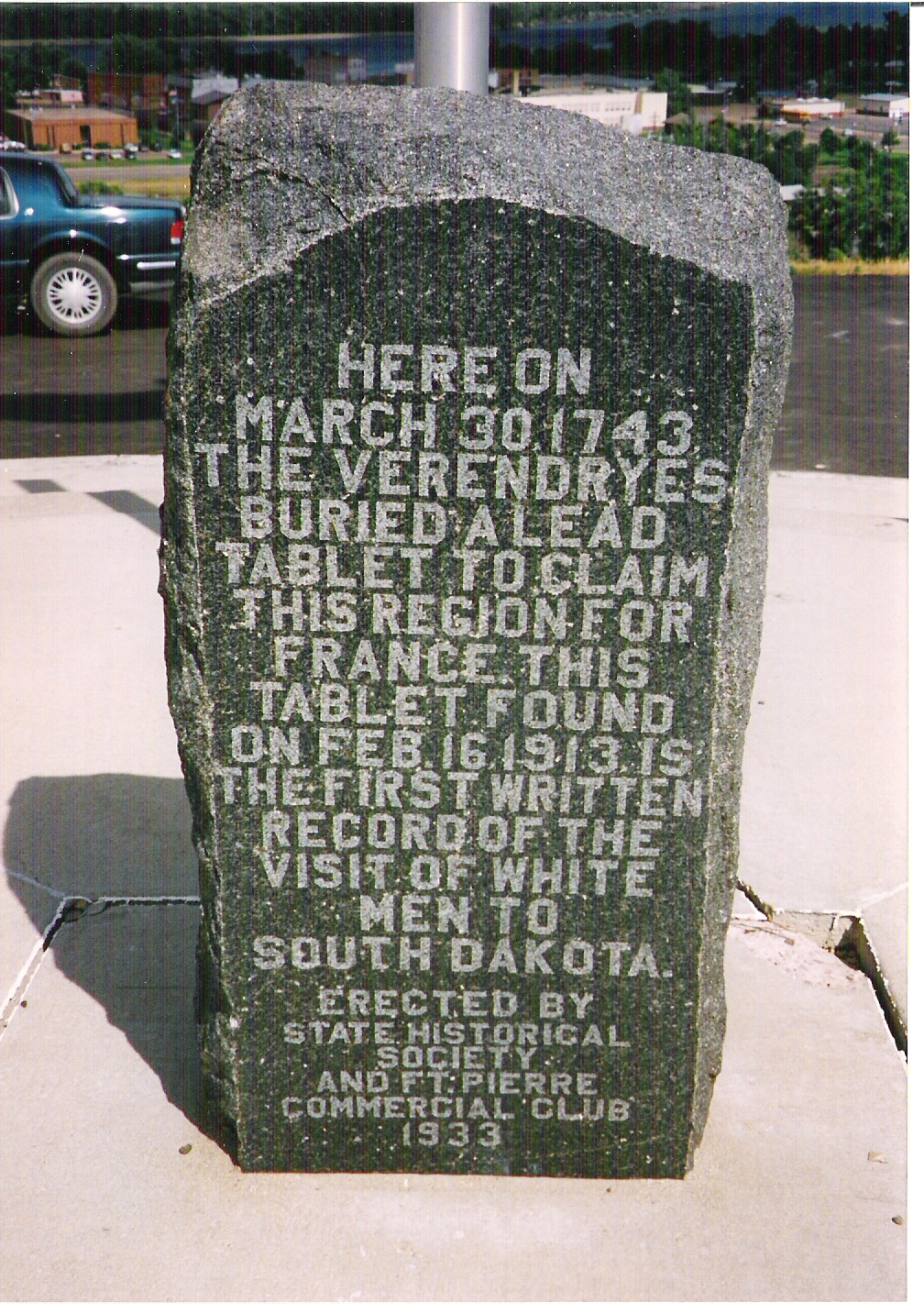
The La Vérendrye brothers. Historical marker at Fort Pierre, South Dakota.

All the tribal names are guesses. Most writers think that the brothers reached the Bighorn Mountains, though Doane Robinson thought they only reached the Black Hills. Given the double sighting of mountains it is possible that they saw both the Laramies and the Bighorns. The first Mandan village was north of the river. The elder Vérendrye gave its latitude as 48°12' which is about 10 miles (16 km) north of any point on the Missouri River. If the reading was not too inaccurate it implies a northern location, possibly a site near modern New Town, North Dakota, as first suggested by Libby in 1916. Vérendrye said the second village was on the river which appeared to flow south and somewhat west, which could be one of several places. Hubert Smith favored a site near present-day Bismarck, North Dakota, because of extensive documentation of Mandan villages in that area and the lack of documentation further north. Smith's view contributed to the closing of the former Verendrye National Monument.

The lead plate was found at Pierre, South Dakota, in 1913 and is now in the South Dakota Cultural Heritage Center in Pierre. It is six by eight inches (15 by 20 cm) and similar to ones placed in the Ohio Valley. The front has a die-stamped Latin inscription referring to Louis XV, Pierre La Vérendrye and the year 1741. On the back is hastily scratched "Placed by Chevalyet de Lave; [garbled] Louis la Londette, A Miotte; 30 March 1743". Londette and Miotte are probably the two other Frenchmen who are otherwise undocumented. The garbled part was first read as "t b St" for Toussaint, assumed to be the first name of Londette. Hubert Smith read "Lo Jost" for Louis-Joseph. The Dictionary of Canadian Biography has "tblt" for Tremblet or Trembey, part of François' name.
