= Nicolas-Joseph de Noyelles de Fleurimont =

French soldier

Nicolas-Joseph de Noyelles (October 13, 1695 – August 16, 1761) originally resided in Rochefort, Aunis, France, but came to New France in 1710 to begin his military career as an ensign in the regular colonial troops. He married in 1718 and, because of a strong family friendship with Governor Charles de Beauharnois, received favorable postings and promotions.

His two main postings were Detroit and (near) Fort Wayne. At Fort Wayne, he became heavily involved in the fur trade. He was also involved in trying to settle wars and allegiances amongst various Indian tribes. It would seem that much of his activity in this area pointed to a high level of ineptness. However, the Beauharnois connection stood him in good stead. In 1744, when Pierre Gaultier de Varennes, sieur de La Vérendrye, lost the western commanders position of directing the fur trade while exploring a route to the western sea, the position was granted to Noyelles. However, it was a demanding job, and he resigned in 1746.

He returned to Montreal and led at least one campaign in the Seven Years' War. Decorated with the cross of Saint Louis in 1749 after a number of letters of commendation by Beauharnois, he returned to France with seven of his eight children and his wife. He died destitute in his home town of Rochefort, quieting an inquiry into his integrity.

Two of his sons also served in the regular troops in Canada: Charles-Joseph, the eldest and Pierre-Philippe, a younger son.
