= Christopher Dufrost de La Jemeraye =

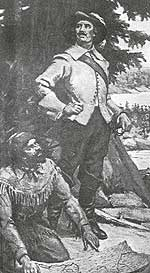

Christopher Dufrost de La Jemeraye (December 6, 1708 – May 10, 1736), also known as Christophe Dufrost de La Jemerais with various variations on the last name, was the lieutenant and nephew of Pierre Gaultier de Varennes et de La Vérendrye in the exploratory party that headed west from Fort Kaministiquia, New France, in 1731. He and Jean Baptiste de La Vérendrye established Fort St. Charles on Lake of the Woods in 1732. In the spring of 1733, he and Jean Baptiste headed down the Winnipeg River to set up a post in the Lake Winnipeg area. Ice stopped them and La Jemeraye returned to Fort St. Charles while his cousin established a small temporary fort named La Barrière.

La Jemeraye continued as an important participant in La Vérendrye's exploration and fur trading activities. He and Jean Baptiste de La Vérendrye built Fort Maurepas about six miles north of present-day Selkirk, Manitoba, in 1735. Traveling from there to Fort St. Charles via the Red River/Savanne Portage route, La Jemeraye, who was very ill, died at the junction of the Red and Roseau rivers. The date of his death gives us proves that, in 1736, La Jemeraye and one of La Vérendrye's sons passed The Forks. The Forks is the site of present-day Winnipeg.

An interesting and important contribution of Christopher Dufrost relates to his skill as a cartographer. He produced the first French map of the west in 1733. It was of high quality and the final copy was produced, at a later date, by the engineer, Gaspard-Joseph Chaussegros de Léry.

His sister was the sainted Marie-Marguerite d'Youville, Catholic nun and foundress of The Sisters of Charity of Montreal.
