= Jean Baptiste de La Vérendrye =

Explorer from New France (1713–1736)

Jean-Baptiste Gaultier de La Vérendrye
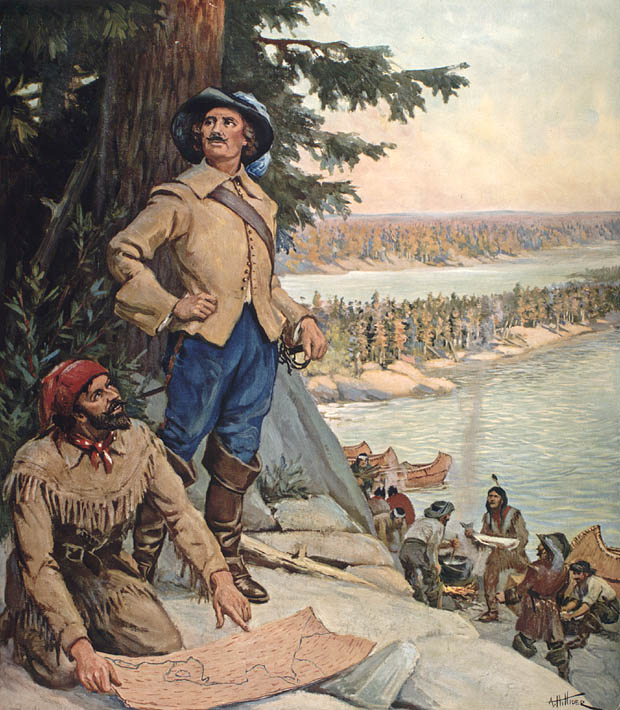
- Jean-Baptiste de La Vérendrye and his cousin, Christopher Dufrost de La Jemeraye
- Born: 3 September 1713; Île Dupas, near Sorel, New France
- Died: 6 June 1736 (aged 22); Near Fort St. Charles, Lake of the Woods, New France
- Cause of death: Killed in the Lake of the Woods massacre
- Occupation: Explorer
- Known for: Participation in western expeditions led by his father; founding of Fort St. Pierre, Fort St. Charles, and Fort Maurepas
- Parent(s): Pierre Gaultier de Varennes et de La Vérendrye; Marie-Anne Dandonneau Du Sablé

Jean-Baptiste Gaultier de la Vérendrye (September 3, 1713 – June 6, 1736) was the eldest son of Pierre Gaultier de Varennes et de La Vérendrye and Marie-Anne Dandonneau Du Sablé. He was born on Île Dupas near Sorel, New France

Jean Baptiste, with three brothers, Pierre Gaultier de La Vérendrye, François de La Vérendrye, and Louis-Joseph Gaultier de La Vérendrye, served in the expedition his father led west in 1731. When they arrived at Fort Kaministiquia some of the engagés (indentured employees), exhausted by the long journey by canoe from Montreal and discouraged by the difficult portages facing them, refused to go on. His father's second in command, Christopher Dufrost de La Jemeraye and Jean Baptiste led a smaller advance party west to Rainy Lake and established a fort they named Fort St. Pierre (after the parish church where Jean Baptiste was baptised).

The following year Jean Baptiste was instrumental in founding Fort St. Charles on Lake of the Woods and in 1734 he established Fort Maurepas on the Red River.

On June 6, 1736, Dakota ambushed a party led by Jean Baptiste soon after they left Fort St. Charles on Lake of the Woods. They were headed for Fort Kaministiquia to fetch provisions. Jean Baptiste, Father Jean-Pierre Aulneau and 19 other men were massacred. Their bodies were later transported to Fort Saint-Charles and buried in the chapel. His death would result in the breakdown of peaceful relations between the French and Dakota, and the beginning of the Dakota-Ojibwe War.

Jean-Baptiste de La Vérendrye's share in the construction of Fort Maurepas makes him one of the founders of the present province of Manitoba.

== See also ==
- Sons of Pierre Gaultier de Varennes, sieur de La Vérendrye:
  - Jean Baptiste de La Vérendrye (b. 1713)
  - Pierre Gaultier de La Vérendrye (b. 1714)
  - François de La Vérendrye (b. 1715)
  - Louis-Joseph Gaultier de La Vérendrye (b. 1717)
- Verendrye Brothers' journey to the Rocky Mountains
