= François de La Vérendrye =

Canadian explorer

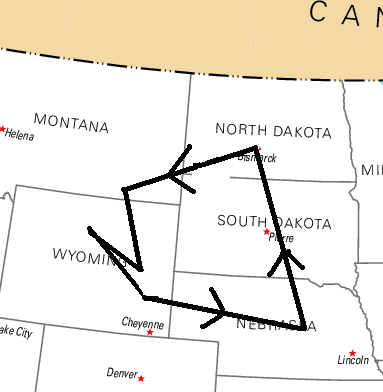
A conjectural map of the route of the La Verendyre expedition of 1742-1743

François de La Vérendrye (1715 – 31 July 1794) was an explorer from New France. He was the third son of Pierre Gaultier de Varennes, sieur de La Vérendrye. He was born at Sorel, New France, in 1715 and was active in his father's trade activities from Fort Kaministiquia to the North Saskatchewan River.

In 1738, he was part of his father's expedition to the Mandan country in what is now North Dakota. In 1739, he accompanied his brother, Louis-Joseph, and together they discovered the Saskatchewan River. In 1742–1743, he and his brother traveled southwest through Mandan territory, probably reaching Wyoming and viewing the Rocky Mountains. They were the first Europeans to cross the northern Great Plains and reach the mountains. François then returned east and served in the army during the Seven Years' War. He died on 31 July 1794, in Montreal.

He was one of two brothers to use the title "Chevalier", the other being Louis-Joseph. This causes some confusion when reading English translations of journals of the time. In 1762, he became known as the Sieur du Tremblay. With his death, the name La Vérendrye disappeared.

== See also ==
- Sons of Pierre Gaultier de Varennes, sieur de La Vérendrye:
  - Jean Baptiste de La Vérendrye (b. 1713)
  - Pierre Gaultier de La Vérendrye (b. 1714)
  - François de La Vérendrye (b. 1715)
  - Louis-Joseph Gaultier de La Vérendrye (b. 1717)
