= Fort Saint Pierre =

Fort Saint Pierre National Historic Site
- Fort Saint Pierre
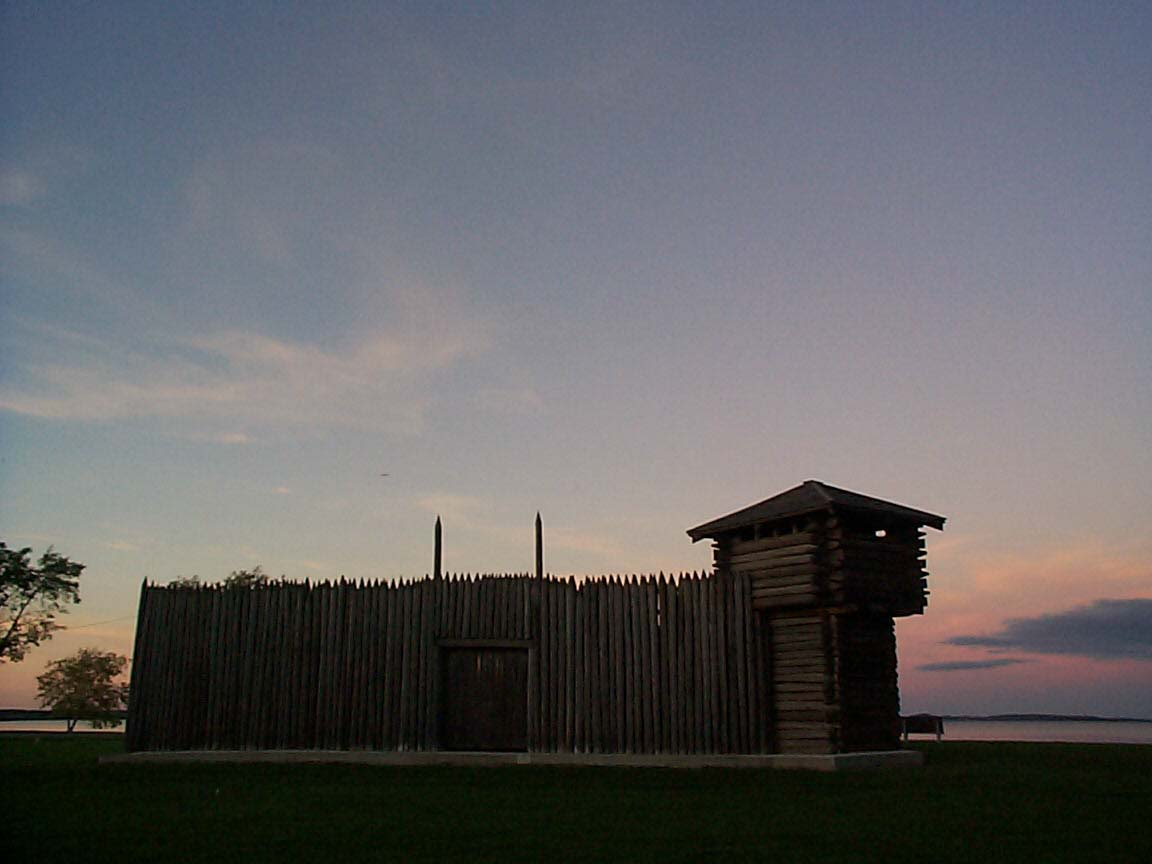

- Location within Ontario
- 48°36′54″N 93°21′24″W

History
- Built: 1731
- Original use: Trading post

Site notes
- Website: Fort St. Pierre National Historic Site

National Historic Site of Canada
- Designated: 28 May 1934

Fort Saint Pierre on Rainy Lake was the first French fort built west of Lake Superior. It was the first of eight forts built during the elder Vérendrye's expansion of trade and exploration westward from the Great Lakes.

== History ==
In 1688 Jacques de Noyon, the first European to reach the area, built a temporary post or camp possibly at the same location. For its position on the fur trade route see Winnipeg River#Exploration and fur trade.

The elder Vérendrye reached Grand Portage in late August 1731. Here most of the men refused to continue because of the late season, difficult portage and largely unknown country. Vérendrye wintered with most of the men at Fort Kaministiquia, but was able to send a few willing men westward under Christopher Dufrost de La Jemeraye. La Jemeraye reached Rainy Lake before the freezeup and built a fort at its outlet. Next May he sent a small load of furs back eastward, Vérendrye arrived in July, and pushed west to Lake of the Woods where he built Fort Saint Charles which quickly overshadowed Fort St. Pierre. Coureurs des bois spread out and drew trade away from the English, but we only know of them from rumors picked up by the English on Hudson Bay. The area produced fish and wild rice. The local people were Monsoni Ojibwe, with Cree further west. Both were at war with the Sioux to the south. The post remained in operation until 1758. Fort Lac la Pluie was built nearby by the North West Company sometime between 1775 and 1787. There was a modern reconstruction of the fort, but it was demolished in 2003 due to the deteriorated condition of the building. The site was on the north bank of the Rainy River just past a series of rapids near its outflow from the lake at the modern town of Fort Frances.

La Colle, a Monsoni chief who assisted La Vérendrye a great deal, made his main camp in the vicinity of the fort. He and his warriors helped control the Sioux of the Prairies in the period when La Vérendrye was leading expeditions and fort building westward.

According to the commemorative plaque by Historic Sites and Monuments of Canada,

"The first post on Rainy Lake was Fort Tekamanigan built by Robutel de La Noue in 1717, but soon abandoned, probably because of Sioux hostility. In 1734 the Sieur La Jemeraye, La Verendrye's nephew and lieutenant, constructed Fort St. Pierre at the south-west end of the lake where it drains into the Rainy River. As one of the postes de la Mer de l'Ouest it served as a trading post and a base for La Verendrye's westward explorations. Fort St. Pierre was abandoned by the French about 1758 during the course of the Seven Years War."

— Historic Sites and Monuments of Canada
