= Saratoga raid =

Coordinates: 43°6′3″N 73°34′53″W

Raid on Saratoga
- Part of King George's War
Date	28 November 1745
Location	Saratoga, New York
Result	French victory

Belligerents
France	Great Britain

Commanders and leaders
Paul Marin de la Malgue	

Strength
600	Colonists

Casualties and losses
	30 killed 60–100 taken prisoner

The Raid on Saratoga was an attack by a French and Indian force on the settlement of Saratoga, New York on November 28, 1745, during King George's War. Led by Paul Marin de la Malgue, the allied force of 600 burned the settlement, killing about 30 and taking 60 to 100 prisoners, in addition.
