= Jacques de Noyon =

French–Canadian explorer and trader (1668–1745)

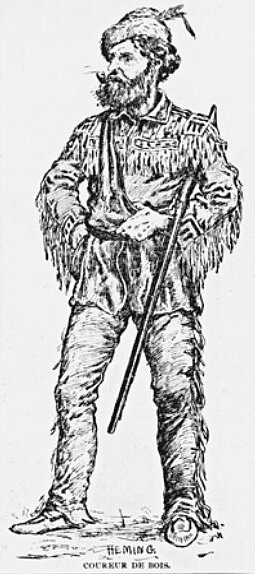
- Coureur de bois, a woodcut by Arthur Heming (1870–1940)
- Born: 12 February 1668; Trois-Rivières, New France
- Died: 12 May 1745 (aged 77); Boucherville, New France
- Occupations: Explorer, trader, soldier and a coureur des bois
- Known for: First European to visit the Boundary Waters region.

Jacques de Noyon (12 February 1668 – 12 May 1745) was a French Canadian explorer, sergeant and coureur des bois. He is the first known European to visit the Boundary Waters region west of Lake Superior.

Jacques de Noyon was born on 12 February 1668, in Trois-Rivières, New France. His family moved to Boucherville not long after.

In 1688, de Noyon and three others traveled from the Montreal area to Fort Caministigoyan on Lake Superior, located at present-day Thunder Bay, Ontario. From there they traveled inland up the Kaministiquia River. His group followed the Indigenous canoe route over the Laurentian Divide, past the present-day site of Atikokan, Ontario, through what is now Quetico Provincial Park and Voyageurs National Park, Minnesota. He built a fort, established ties to the local Assiniboine people, and spent the winter on the shore of Rainy Lake. There is some question as to whether de Noyon in fact made it as far as Lake of the Woods or not.

According to the waymarker on Rainy Lake Lookout on the north side of Noden Causeway about 6.5 km east of Fort Frances,

"Jacques de Noyon was the first white man to explore this region. Born in Trois-Rivieres, Noyon worked in the fur trade as a coureur de bois. In 1688, he led an expedition beyond Lake Superior into territory previously unknown to fur traders. He and his men ascended the Kaministiquia River, crossed Dog Lake, and through several portages, reached Rainy Lake. After wintering southwest of here on the Rainy River, they pushed on to Lake of the Woods in 1689. There Assiniboines told Noyon of a route to Lake Winnipeg and the Red River. Noyon's report on his trip was used by La Verendrye when he explored westward to Red River in 1732."

— Ontario Heritage Foundation, Government of Ontario

The following summer de Noyon returned to Lake Superior, perhaps along what is now the Canada–United States border and includes Quetico Provincial Park, the Boundary Waters Canoe Area Wilderness, La Verendrye Provincial Park, and Grand Portage National Monument.

English-French animosity prevented Europeans from returning to the area west of Lake Superior for a number of years. In the 1730s La Vérendrye re-visited this Boundary Waters region, perhaps with assistance from the knowledge gained by de Noyon's travels over 40 years before. The region would become an important part of the North American fur trade, connecting the Great Lakes to the far northwestern interior of Manitoba, Saskatchewan, and beyond.

Jacques de Noyon continued to travel throughout New France and New England as a trader and coureur des bois. He married Abigail Stebbins, daughter of John Stebbins, in Deerfield, Massachusetts in 1704. He was still there when the French and Indians made the 1704 Raid on Deerfield. He was captured and brought back to Canada with his wife. Ruined, he became a soldier in Fort Pontchartrain du Détroit (Detroit), finishing as a sergeant. He died on 12 May 1745 in Boucherville.

Jacques de Noyon’s sister, Marguerite de Noyon, was the great-grandmother of Toussaint Charbonneau, a fur trapper, merchant and the husband of Sacagawea whom he joined in the Lewis and Clark expedition.

== See also ==
- Pierre Gaultier de Varennes, sieur de La Vérendrye
