= Zacharie Robutel de La Noue =

Zacharie Robutel de La Noue (June 4, 1665 – 1733) was a French lieutenant and captain in the colonial regular troops, and seigneur of Châteauguay. Robutel de La Noue was born in Montreal, New France. He was the son of Claude Robutel de La Noue, seigneur of Île Saint-Paul, and Suzanne de Gabrielle. As a soldier he escorted various expeditions - to Hudson Bay in 1686 with Pierre de Troyes, Chevalier de Troyes and up the Ottawa River in 1692. He also led military attacks on Mohawk villages in 1692–93. He was sent by governor Vaudreuil in July 1717 to establish a chain of three posts from Lake Superior to Lake of the Woods, but he was only able to re-establish a fur trading post, Fort Kaministiquia, on the Kaministiquia River. He remained there as commandant until 1721.

He died at Baie des Puants (Green Bay, Wisconsin) in 1733.
