= Louis-Joseph Gaultier de La Vérendrye =

French Canadian fur trader and explorer (1717–1761)

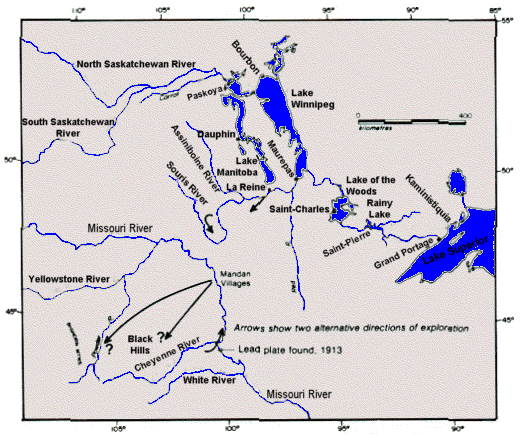
- A map of the area of operations of the La Vérendrye family.
- Born: November 9, 1717; Quebec
- Died: 15 November 1761 (aged 44); Atlantic Ocean
- Occupations: Fur trader, explorer

Louis-Joseph Gaultier de La Vérendrye (9 November 1717 – 15 November 1761) was a fur trader and explorer from New France. He, his three brothers, and his father Pierre La Vérendrye pushed trade and exploration west from the Great Lakes. He, his brother, and two colleagues are thought to be the first Europeans to have crossed the northern Great Plains and seen the Rocky Mountains in Wyoming.

Louis-Joseph Verendrye was born in Quebec. He joined the family business in 1735, leaving Montreal with his father and travelling west to Fort St. Charles on Lake of the Woods. He assisted in re-establishing Fort Maurepas in 1736 and building Fort La Reine in 1738. From Fort La Reine, he and his father travelled to visit the Mandan Native Americans along the Missouri River in North Dakota later that same year. In 1739 and 1740, he went north from Fort La Reine and explored Lake Winnipeg, Lake Manitoba, Lake Winnipegosis and the Saskatchewan River as far as the area of the present day The Pas.

== Rocky Mountains journey ==
In 1743–1744, he may have travelled southwest to what was probably Wyoming and came within sight of the Rocky Mountains. The documentation is poor and it may have been a different Vérendrye brother who made the journey.

== Commandant posts ==
By late 1743, Louis-Joseph's father, Pierre La Vérendrye, was forced to resign as commandant of the poste de l’Ouest. The new commandant, Nicolas-Joseph de Noyelles de Fleurimont, retained the services of La Vérendrye's sons during his tenure, which began in 1744. Louis-Joseph was post commander at three posts, the most important one being Fort Kaministiquia.

The elder La Vérendrye again became western commandant in 1747, while Louis-Joseph returned to New France with Noyelles. He provided services to both Noyelles and Governor Beauharnois while expecting and intending to rejoin his father at the western posts. Before he made that return, his father returned east and died in 1749. Louis-Joseph spent the next several years settling his father's financial affairs, and subsequently entered into partnership with Luc de la Corne in the fur trade. His brother François was an interpreter for the partnership.

The claim that he reached the Saskatchewan River Forks in 1749 may be false.

In 1756, Louis-Joseph obtained a three-year appointment as commandant of the poste de l'Ouest. He carried out this enterprise through agents, as he was personally involved in military matters during the Seven Years' War. He was succeeded as western commander in 1758 by Charles-René Dejordy de Villebon. After the conquest of Quebec he died while returning to France, when his ship, the Auguste, sank off Cape Breton.

== In popular culture ==
A fictionalized version of de la Vérendrye appears in the 2014 video game Assassin's Creed Rogue, where he is a member of the Colonial Brotherhood of Assassins. He is introduced as a supporting character with an antagonistic relationship with protagonist Shay Cormac, whom he consistently belittles and refers to as a 'cabbage farmer', and is known for his short temper and brusque and egotistical attitude. Following Shay's defection to the Templars, de la Vérendrye takes on the role of an antagonist, and in the penultimate mission of the game, is hunted down by Shay, Haytham Kenway, and James Cook for his maps leading to the Precursor sites the Assassins and Templars seek. After cornering him off the coast of Newfoundland, Shay boards de la Vérendrye's ship, Le Gerfaut, and mortally wounds him before throwing him overboard to his death.

== See also ==
- Sons of Pierre Gaultier de Varennes, sieur de La Vérendrye:
  - Jean Baptiste de La Vérendrye (b. 1713)
  - Pierre Gaultier de La Vérendrye (b. 1714)
  - François de La Vérendrye (b. 1715)
  - Louis-Joseph Gaultier de La Vérendrye (b. 1717)
