= Fort La Reine =

Historic fort in Manitoba, Canada

Coordinates: 49.9512°N 98.3276°W

- Established: 1738
- Location: Portage la Prairie Manitoba Canada
- Type: historic site
- Website: www.fortlareinemuseum.com/

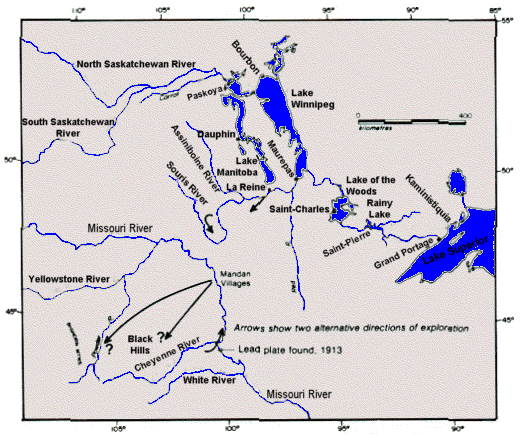
A map of the area of operations of the La Vérendrye family.

Fort La Reine was built in 1738 and is one of the forts of the western expansion directed by Pierre Gaultier de Varennes et de La Vérendrye, first military commander in the west of what is now known as Canada. Located on the Assiniboine River where present day Portage la Prairie, Manitoba, stands, the fort served as a fur trading post. It was also the base of operations for much exploration north and west. From Fort La Reine, explorers made their way to Lake Manitoba and Lake Winnipegosis, Lake Winnipeg and the Saskatchewan River.

Louis-Joseph Gaultier de La Vérendrye, the youngest La Vérendrye son, led expeditions from Fort La Reine and built the following western installations in what is now Manitoba: Fort Dauphin, Fort Bourbon, and Fort Paskoya. In 1743, the fort was also the starting point for an exploration of the upper Missouri River as far as the Yellowstone River. One old source says that the fort was burnt to the ground by the Assiniboines after the French had left it in 1752.

Fort La Reine is near the portage from the Assiniboine north to Lake Manitoba. The elder Verendrye left Fort Maurepas at the mouth of the Red River in September 1738, ascended that river to the present site of Winnipeg, ascended the Assiniboine and on October 3 chose a site for Fort La Reine. Morton thinks the site was about 21 miles east of Portage la Prairie and two miles southeast of Poplar Point. He thinks the fort was moved west to Portage la Prairie the following summer. In 1738 Fort Rouge (fortification) was built at the present site of Winnipeg. Fort La Reine was the base for the elder Verendrye's journey to the Mandans in North Dakota (October 1738 to January 1739). In 1742-43 it was the base for the Verendrye Brothers' journey to the Rocky Mountains. It became increasing clear that neither the Assiniboine nor the Missouri was the route to the west and French attention shifted north to the Saskatchewan River.

The first priest to travel this far west arrived at the fort in 1743. He was a Jesuit named Claude-Godefroy Coquart.

Around 1770, when trade was re-established, Adhemar's Fort and Blondishe's Fort were in the area.

The site was designated a National Historic Site of Canada in 1925.

== Fort la Reine Museum ==
Today there is a museum named after the original fort located in Portage la Prairie, MB. There is a replica of Fort la Reine on the Museum in addition numerous other buildings covering local history from the time of La Vérendrye to current day.

The Museum is affiliated with: CMA, CHIN, and Virtual Museum of Canada.
