= Roseau River (Manitoba–Minnesota) =

River in Manitoba, Canada and Minnesota, United States

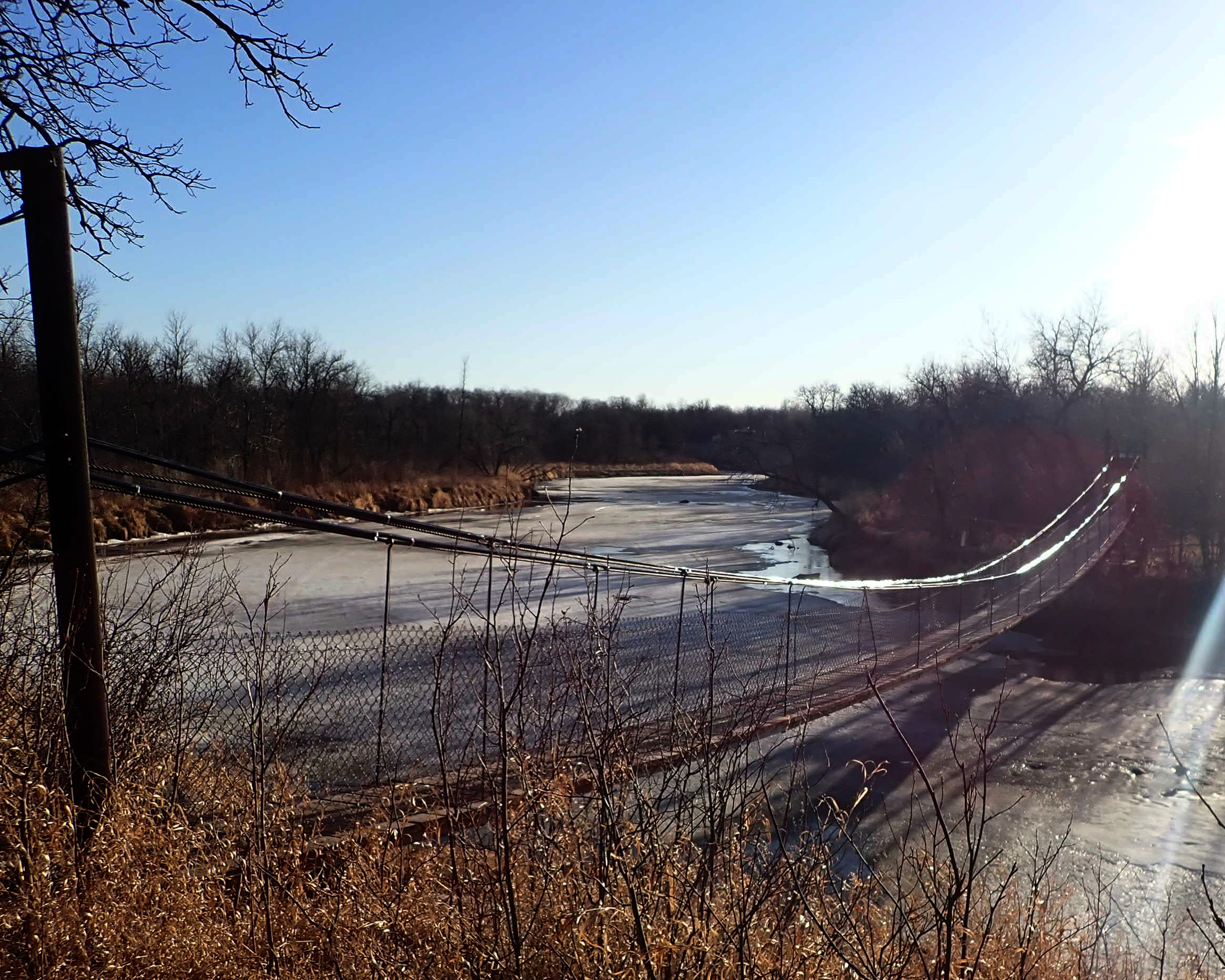

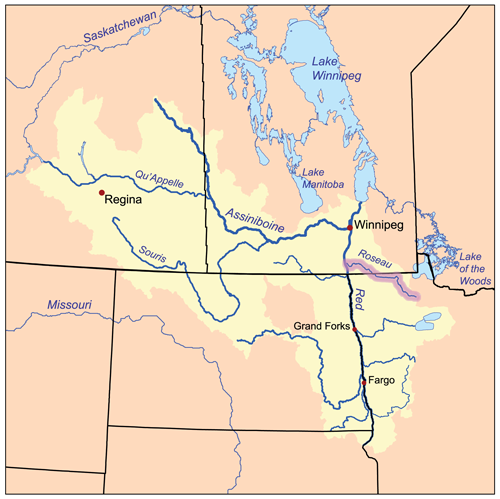
- The Red River drainage basin, with the Roseau River highlighted

- Mouth of the Roseau River
- Native name: Gaa-zhaazhaaganashkokaawi-ziibi (Ojibwe)

Location
- Countries: United States, Canada
- State/Province: Minnesota, Manitoba
- Counties: Roseau, Beltram, Lake of the Woods Counties, Minnesota

Physical characteristics
- Source
  - coordinates: 48.5288662°N 95.2046877°W
- Mouth
  - coordinates: 49°08′38″N 97°15′16″W
- Length: 214-mile-long (344 km)

Basin features
- Progression: Roseau River→ Red River of the North→ Lake Winnipeg→ Nelson River→ Hudson Bay
- River system: Red River of the North

The Roseau River is a 214-mile-long (344 km) tributary of the Red River of the North, in southern Manitoba in Canada and northwestern Minnesota in the United States. Via the Red River, Lake Winnipeg and the Nelson River, it is part of the watershed of Hudson Bay.

The name is from the French for reed, roseau, in turn from the Ojibwe Gaa-zhaazhaaganashkokaawi-ziibi, "river where it is abundant with emerging rush" for the upper Roseau River. The lower Roseau River and South Fork Roseau River are named Okwewanashko-ziibi in Ojibwe.

The river flows through the Roseau River Anishinabe First Nation. It is also the namesake for the community of Roseau River in Manitoba.

== See also ==
- List of Manitoba rivers
- List of Minnesota rivers
- List of longest streams of Minnesota
