= Fort Saint Charles =

Coordinates: 49.361974°N 94.980921°W

- Magnuson's Island, Northwest Angle, Lake of the Woods County, Minnesota
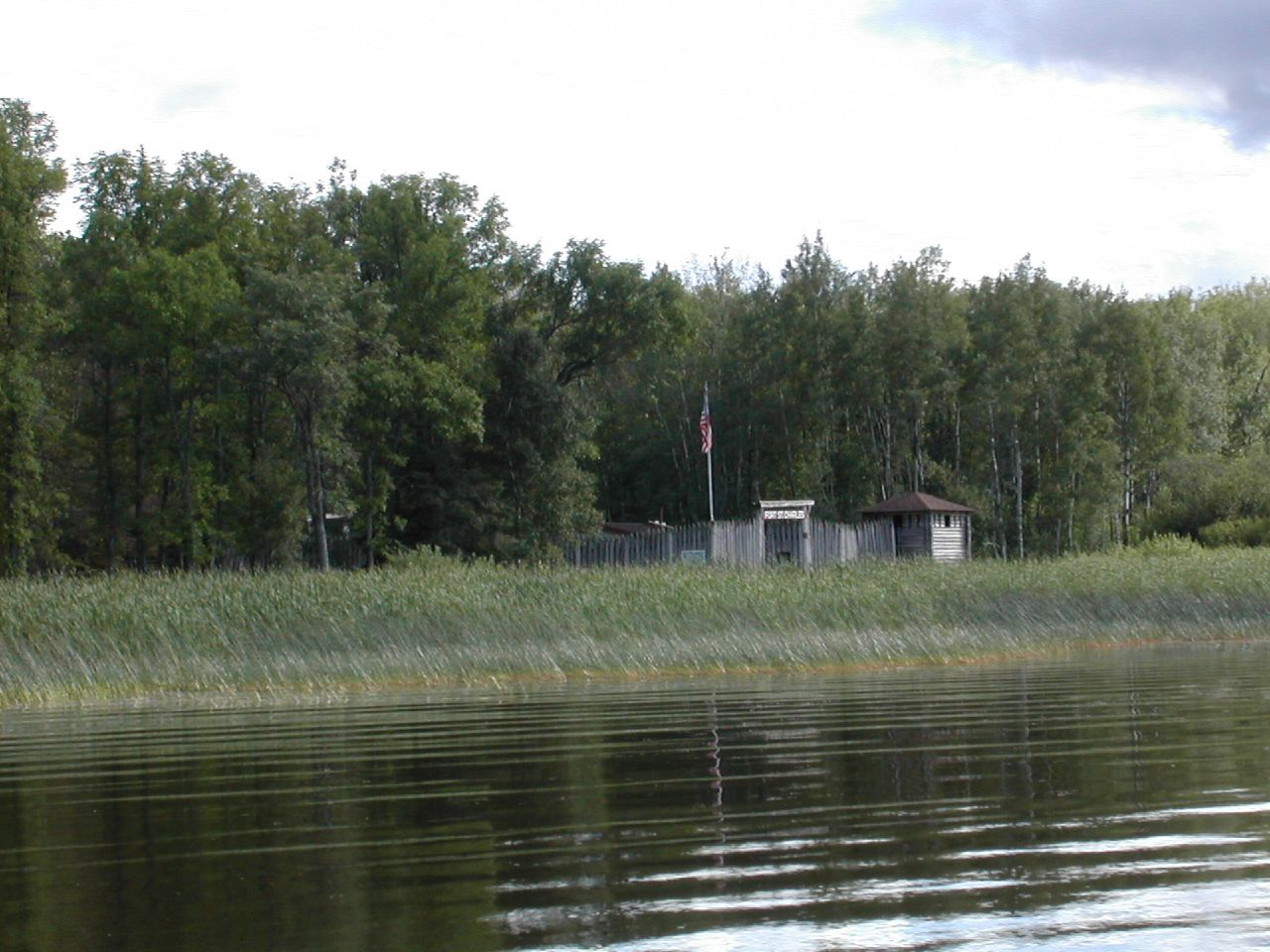
- Reconstructed version of the fort.

Site information
- Type: trading post

Site history
- Built: 1732

- Fort St. Charles Archeological Site
- U.S. National Register of Historic Places
- Location within Minnesota Location within the United States
- Nearest city: Angle Inlet, Minnesota
- Area: 9.4 acres (3.8 ha)
- Built: 1732
- NRHP reference No.: 83000911
- Added to NRHP: April 8, 1983

Fort Saint Charles (1732) on Lake of the Woods was the second post built by La Vérendrye during his expansion of trade and exploration west of Lake Superior. It was located on Magnuson's Island on the Northwest Angle of Minnesota, 3.5 miles east of Angle Inlet, Minnesota and one mile southwest of Penasse, Minnesota, the most northerly point in that state. The site of the modern reconstruction may be somewhat different since the lake levels were raised by control structures on the Winnipeg River. For related forts, see Winnipeg River.

La Vérendrye reached the north shore of Lake Superior in late 1731 and sent men ahead to build Fort St. Pierre on Rainy Lake. In July or August 1732 he, his eldest son Jean Baptiste de La Vérendrye, his nephew Christopher Dufrost de La Jemeraye, Father Charles-Michel Mesaiger and 50 canoes of Indians left Fort Saint Pierre and built Fort Saint Charles on Lake of the Woods. The fort was 60 by 100 feet with two gates and a double row of 15-foot palisades and four bastions and a watch tower. The internal buildings were roofed with bark. There was abundant fishing, hunting and wild rice, an important matter since it was difficult to haul food from Montreal or Fort Michilimackinac. Next spring he sent Jean Baptiste and La Jameraye down the Winnipeg. They got to within 15 or 20 leagues of the lake when they were blocked by ice. The English on Hudson Bay reported increased activity of Coureurs des bois west of the fort, but La Vérendrye said nothing about them in his reports. On the first of January 1734 a group of Assiniboines reached the fort and brought the Europeans their first news of the Mandans. Some time after this two of his men returned from Lake Winnipeg and the first Fort Maurepas (Canada) was built soon after. In 1735 La Jameraye's men returned to the Lake from the Red River of the North via the Roseau River (Manitoba-Minnesota), Portage de la Savanne and Reed River.

On June 6, 1736 an expedition departed from Fort Saint Charles, consisting of Jean Baptiste de La Vérendrye (the eldest son) with the Jesuit missionary priest Father Jean-Pierre Aulneau and nineteen French-Canadian voyageurs. They were headed for Fort Michilimackinac to get winter supplies before exploring further west. They had traveled only a few kilometres from the fort when they were attacked by Dakota people, who killed everyone in the party. The Dakota were retaliating against La Vérendrye père, who was trading guns for beaver skins to their traditional enemies, the Cree and Assiniboine, in an effort to both cover his mounting expenses and get out of debt. The expedition members were killed on a small island, called Massacre Island, Ontario, however historians have been unable to reach consensus on its exact identity. After the massacre was discovered, La Vérendrye père directed that the bodies of his son and the priest, and the heads of the 19 voyageurs, be brought back for burial at Fort Saint Charles. The remains of his son and the priest were buried under the altar stone of the chapel, and the voyageurs were buried outside.

The fort was abandoned in 1749.

== Reconstruction ==
Long after the fort had been abandoned and disappeared, newly discovered historic documents helped people find its location. In 1890 Father Aulneau's letters sent to family in Vendée, France were discovered. They were translated and published in 1893 by A. S. Jones, s.j., archivist of St. Mary's College in Montreal, as The Aulneau Collection. They contributed to the work of Reuben Gold Thwaites on compilation and publication of the Jesuit Relations, the accounts of missionary Jesuits in New France.

Academics at St. Boniface College in Winnipeg read The Aulneau Collection, which inspired a number of expeditions to discover the old sites. By 1908 the old fort location and probable location of Massacre Island had been established. The group that found the fort, accompanied by Louis Arthur Prud'homme, also discovered the skulls of nineteen voyagers from the expedition.

In 1911 Prud'homme recounted the conclusions of such expeditions in the Bulletin of the Historical Society of St. Boniface. In 1912 a Jesuit team excavated at the site of the fort, where they identified remains as those of La Vérendrye and Aulneau of the 1736 expedition by artifacts, including Aulneau's rosary and the hook to his cassock, buried with him under the altar.

To celebrate the Golden Anniversary of the Catholic Knights of Columbus in Minnesota, they and co-religionists in Manitoba raised funds to buy the property of the fort and reconstruct it, including a shrine to Fr. Aulneau. (This may be a distortion of the history, as the fort was for commercial purposes.) Begun in 1949, they completed the project in 1950. The Fort is situated on Magnuson's Island, at the site of the old fort, at the mouth of Angle Inlet.

Local NW Angle pioneer residents (in particular Norman Carlson and Joe Risser) were instrumental in the reconstruction of Fort St Charles. They provided invaluable machinery and knowledge of the area, and without their assistance, the Knights of Columbus would have fallen on hard times in their quest for the restoration.
