= Pierre Gaultier de Varennes, sieur de La Vérendrye =

18th-century French Canadian military officer, fur trader and explorer

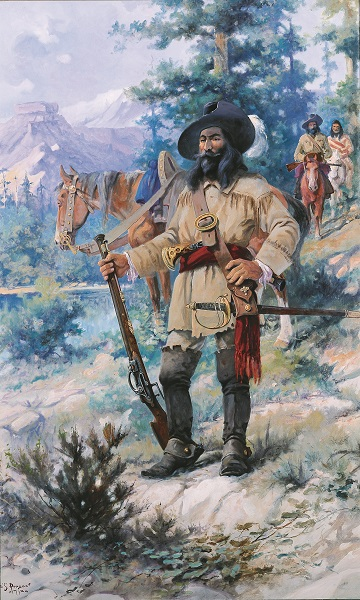
- Portrait of de Varennes by Edgar Samuel Paxson (1912)
- Born: 17 November 1685; Trois-Rivières, New France
- Died: 5 December 1749 (aged 64); Montreal, New France
- Resting place: Notre-Dame Church (Montreal)
- Occupations: explorer; fur trader
- Known for: exploration of lands beyond Great Lakes

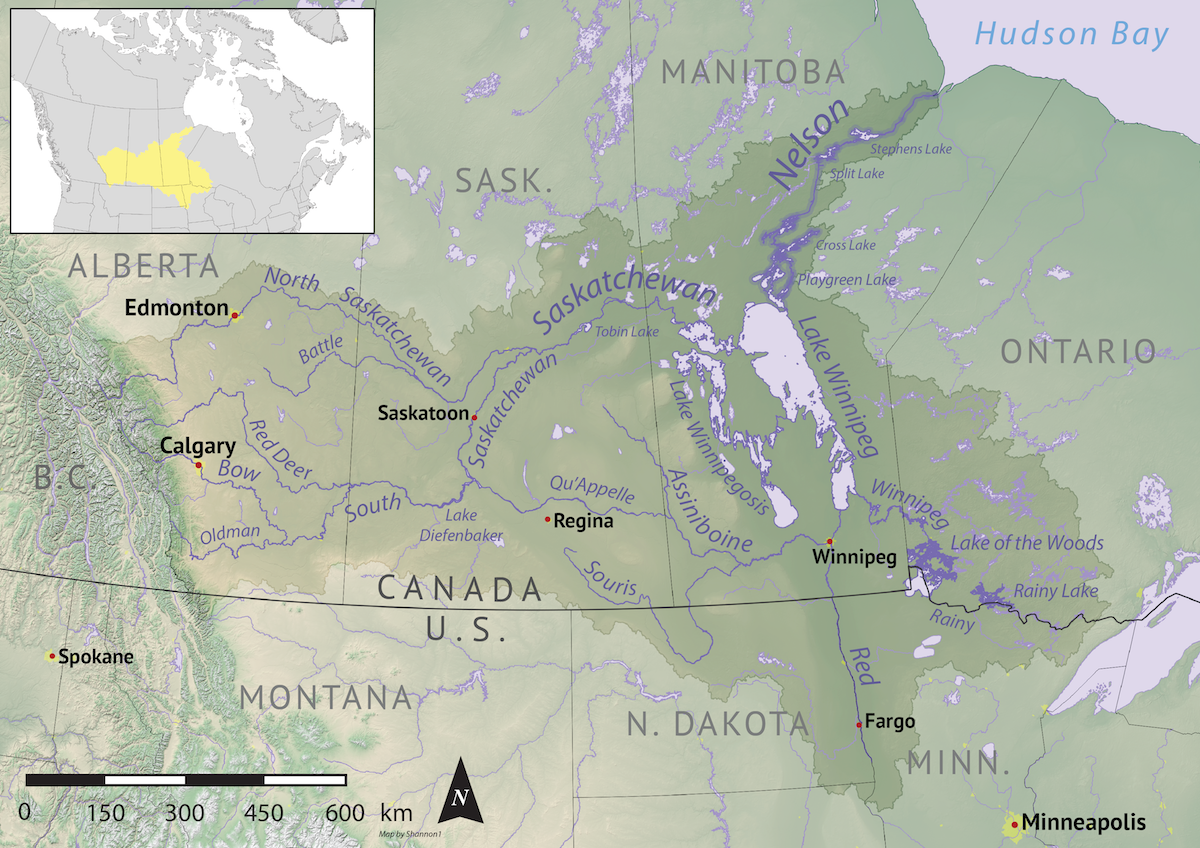
La Vérendrye explored the area from Lake Superior to the mouth of the Saskatchewan River. He also reached North Dakota and his sons reached Wyoming.

Pierre Gaultier de Varennes, sieur de La Vérendrye (17 November 1685 – 5 December 1749) was a military officer, fur trader, and explorer. In the 1730s, he and his four sons explored the area west of Lake Superior and established trading posts there. They were part of a process that added Western Canada to the original New France territory that was centred along the Saint Lawrence basin.

He was the first known European to reach present-day North Dakota and the upper Missouri River in the United States. In the 1740s, two of his sons crossed the prairie as far as present-day Wyoming, United States, and were the first Europeans to see the Rocky Mountains north of New Mexico.

== Early life ==
Born in Trois-Rivières, New France, Pierre was the eldest son of René Gaultier de Varennes, who came to Canada as a soldier in 1665, and Marie, the daughter of Pierre Boucher, the first Governor of Trois-Rivières. The Gaultier family were minor nobility or landowners who came from the Anjou area of France. Varennes and La Vérendrye were 2 of their estates.

Pierre's father died when he was 3, and he was educated at the Jesuit seminary in Quebec. At the age of twelve he received a cadet's commission in the French Marines in Canada. In 1704 and 1705 La Vérendrye took part in the raids of Queen Anne's War, which was waged by colonists in the English and French areas of North America. He was present at the Raid on Deerfield in present-day Massachusetts. The French and their Abenaki allies took more than a hundred captives from the village, forcing them on the 300-mile journey through the wilderness to return to Montreal. During those years, both sides often took captives for ransom. The next year La Vérendrye participated in an unsuccessful attack on the English settlement of St. John's, Newfoundland.

At age 22, he enlisted in the French Army, and fought in Flanders during the War of the Spanish Succession; he was seriously wounded at the Battle of Malplaquet. After recovering from his injuries and being given parole as a prisoner of war, Gaultier returned to Canada and married Marie-Anne, daughter of Louis Dandonneau, Sieur Du Sablé, in 1712. For the next 15 years, he supported his family by farming and fur trading along the Saint Lawrence.

== Explorations ==
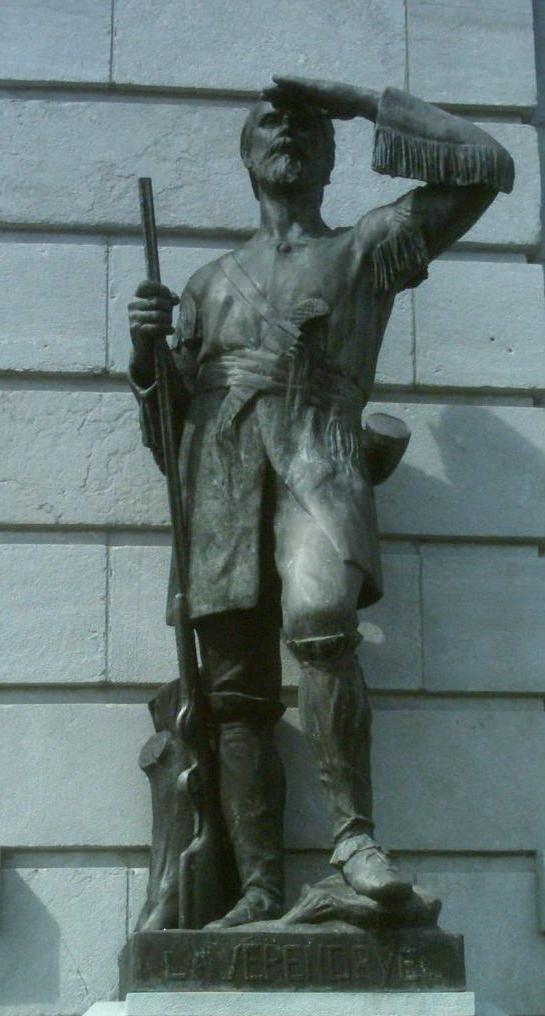
Jean Bailleul's Pierre Gaultier de Varennes, sieur de La Vérendrye sculpture in front of Parliament Building (Quebec)

Yellow: Founded by Vérendrye and his sons
Yellow: Founded by Vérendrye and his sons
Blue wave: Saskatchewan River (north) and Assiniboine River (south)

In 1726 his fortunes changed when his brother Jacques-René was appointed the commander of the poste du Nord. This was the north shore of Lake Superior with three main posts: Fort Kaministiquia, which was a terminus for the main route west; a post at the mouth of the Nipigon River; and one near the future site of Wawa, Ontario, which had river connections to James Bay. La Vérendrye began trading in the area and in 1728 was appointed as commandant when his brother left to fight the Meskwaki.

He became involved with the quest to find a route to the Pacific, what was known as the Northwest Passage. Under the 1713 Treaty of Utrecht, Great Britain had taken control of Hudson Bay and thereby blocked the French from using that area. At this time people thought that not far to the west was an inlet from the Pacific called the mer du couchant, similar to the equally mythical Strait of Annian. They thought also that travelers could cross the height of land and find a River of the West that flowed all the way to the Pacific. (For the area to be explored see Early Canadian canoe routes, Nelson River Basin.)

In 1688 Jacques de Noyon had reached Rainy Lake. In 1717 Zacharie Robutel de La Noue tried to reach Rainy Lake but succeeded only in establishing Fort Kaministiquia. The British on Hudson Bay heard reports of coureurs des bois west of Lake Superior, but they left no records in the French archives. Morton thinks they may have gotten as far as Lake Winnipeg. In 1716 a memoir drawn up by Governor Vaudreuil showed lakes and portages as far as Lake of the Woods, from which flowed a river to the "Sea of the West". This implies that Frenchmen had explored west of Lake Superior before Vérendrye did so.

La Vérendrye questioned the Natives who came to trade. He learned of the Mandan country on the upper Missouri River. These people were described as white men who lived in big houses. Auchagah, a Cree guide, made a map of the canoe routes between Lake Superior and Lake Winnipeg based on his and other Cree experience. La Vérendrye judged correctly that Lake Winnipeg was the geographic key which had to be reached to allow further exploration.

In 1730 he met Governor Beauharnois at Quebec and worked out a plan. La Vérendrye would build a post on Lake Winnipeg. The expedition would be paid for by Quebec merchants who hoped to profit from the resulting fur trade. This financing was fragile because the merchants lacked the capital and organization to efficiently move supplies so far to the west. An additional goal was to divert furs from being traded to the British on Hudson Bay. In the absence of government funds, exploration was dependent on financing from the fur trade. It is not clear whether La Vérendrye was genuinely interested in exploration or whether exploration was a pretext for expansion of the fur trade. Maurepas, the French Minister of Marine, was very interested in exploration, but would not provide funds. According to Pehr Kalm, La Vérendrye was acting upon orders given by de Beauharnois to explore until he could reach the ocean.

In 1731 La Vérendrye, three of his sons and 50 engagés left Montreal. That autumn his son Jean-Baptiste built Fort St. Pierre on Rainy Lake. Next year they built Fort St. Charles on Lake of the Woods, which became his headquarters for the next several years. In 1733 Jean-Baptiste got within 20 miles of Lake Winnipeg but was blocked by ice and lack of supplies. In 1734 their party reached Lake Winnipeg. Jean-Baptiste built Fort Maurepas near the mouth of the Red River at the southern end of the lake. In 1734 La Vérendrye went to Quebec to reorganize the finances and returned to the western post the following spring. In 1734 more than half the beaver pelts reaching Quebec came from La Vérendrye's posts. But by 1736 it was clear that the supply system was not working, and Jean-Baptiste was forced to go to Lake Superior for supplies. He along with 20 other Frenchmen, 19 voyageurs including the Jesuit missionary priest Jean-Pierre Aulneau who accompanied them, were killed by the Sioux on Massacre Island in Lake of the Woods. La Vérendrye restrained the local Cree from a war of revenge in order to protect the fur trade. In 1737 La Vérendrye returned to Quebec on business.

In Paris, Maurepas was pushing for more exploration. By this time explorers had identified two candidates as the 'River of the West'. The correct one was the Saskatchewan River, which flows east into Lake Winnipeg. The other was the Missouri River in the Mandan country in what is now North Dakota, United States. The Mandan were said to live in big houses and resemble Frenchmen. La Vérendrye picked the Missouri. In September 1738 he reached Fort Maurepas on Lake Winnipeg and ascended the Assiniboine River to Portage la Prairie, where he built Fort La Reine just south of Lake Manitoba (October 1738).

Joining a large band of Assiniboines, he pushed southwest across the prairie and reached a Mandan village probably somewhere near the modern New Town, North Dakota, about 70 miles east of the Montana border. He did not push on to the Missouri River but sent his son Louis-Joseph to do it for him. In order to get rid of their numerous Assiniboine guests, the Mandan claimed that there was a Sioux war party in the area. The Assiniboines fled, taking with them the Cree interpreter. Unable to talk to the Mandan, La Vérendrye left two Frenchmen to learn the language and returned to Fort La Reine (January 1739).

Later in 1739, La Vérendrye's son was killed in battle with the Ojibwe and Dakota. The French held the Dakota solely responsible, with La Vérendrye declaring in a fit of rage "Rub these people out, and wipe them off the face of the Earth!" This incident was the final breaking point that resulted in the Dakota-Ojibwe War.

In 1740 he returned to Quebec on business, and in 1741 started on his fourth and last journey west. From Fort La Reine he sent his son Louis-Joseph exploring westward as far as, probably, the Big Horn Mountains of Wyoming (1742–43). (See: Verendrye brothers' journey to the Rocky Mountains) He worked to consolidate his hold on the chain of lakes that look like a single lake west of Lake Winnipeg, establishing Fort Dauphin (Manitoba), Fort Bourbon and Fort Paskoya. Back in France, Maurepas was growing increasingly irritated with La Vérendrye, who he thought was trading in furs when he should be exploring. In 1742 Maurepas suggested that he be replaced.

In 1743 La Vérendrye resigned. He returned to New France and led the life of a gentleman while doing a considerable business since his sons remained as traders in the west. In 1746 he was reappointed to his old post. He was planning the fifth expedition, this time up the Saskatchewan River, when he died on December 5, 1749. Shortly before his death, he was awarded the Order of Saint Louis.

== Afterwards ==
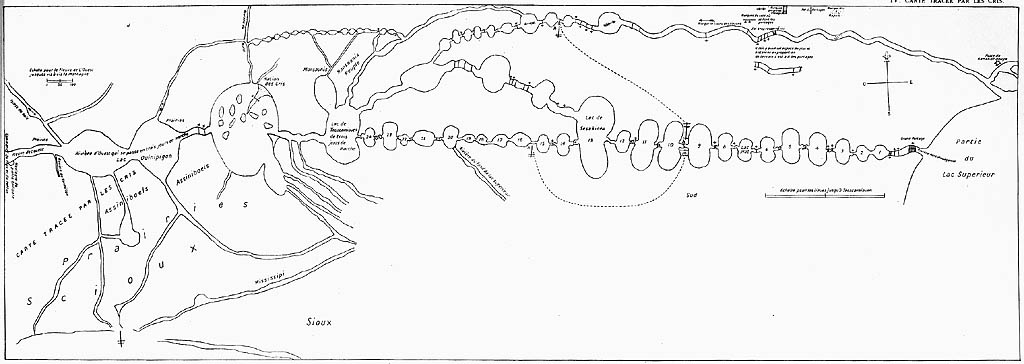
Map of canoe routes west of Lake Superior, drawn by Auchagah for La Vérendrye in 1728 or 1729. It shows the two routes from Lake Superior (Grand Portage and Kaministiquia River), an exaggerated Lake of the Woods, and a distorted Lake Winnipeg

From 1744 to 1746 Nicolas-Joseph de Noyelles de Fleurimont held the command of poste du Nord, but accomplished little. After the elder La Vérendrye's death, the new governor Jonquière forced his sons out of their father's patrimony.

Control of the west was given to Jacques Legardeur de Saint-Pierre (1750–53). He built Fort La Jonquière somewhere on the Saskatchewan, but failed in an attempt to ascend that river. He was followed by Louis de la Corne, Chevalier de la Corne (1753-1756). He built Fort de la Corne on the Saskatchewan. In 1756 the western command was given to Pierre's son Louis-Joseph Gaultier de La Vérendrye, but he was unable to travel to the west. During the French and Indian War (1754-1763), the North American front of the Seven Years' War, the French gradually abandoned the western posts. With France's defeat, the British took control of New France territory east of the Mississippi River.

== Legacy and honours ==
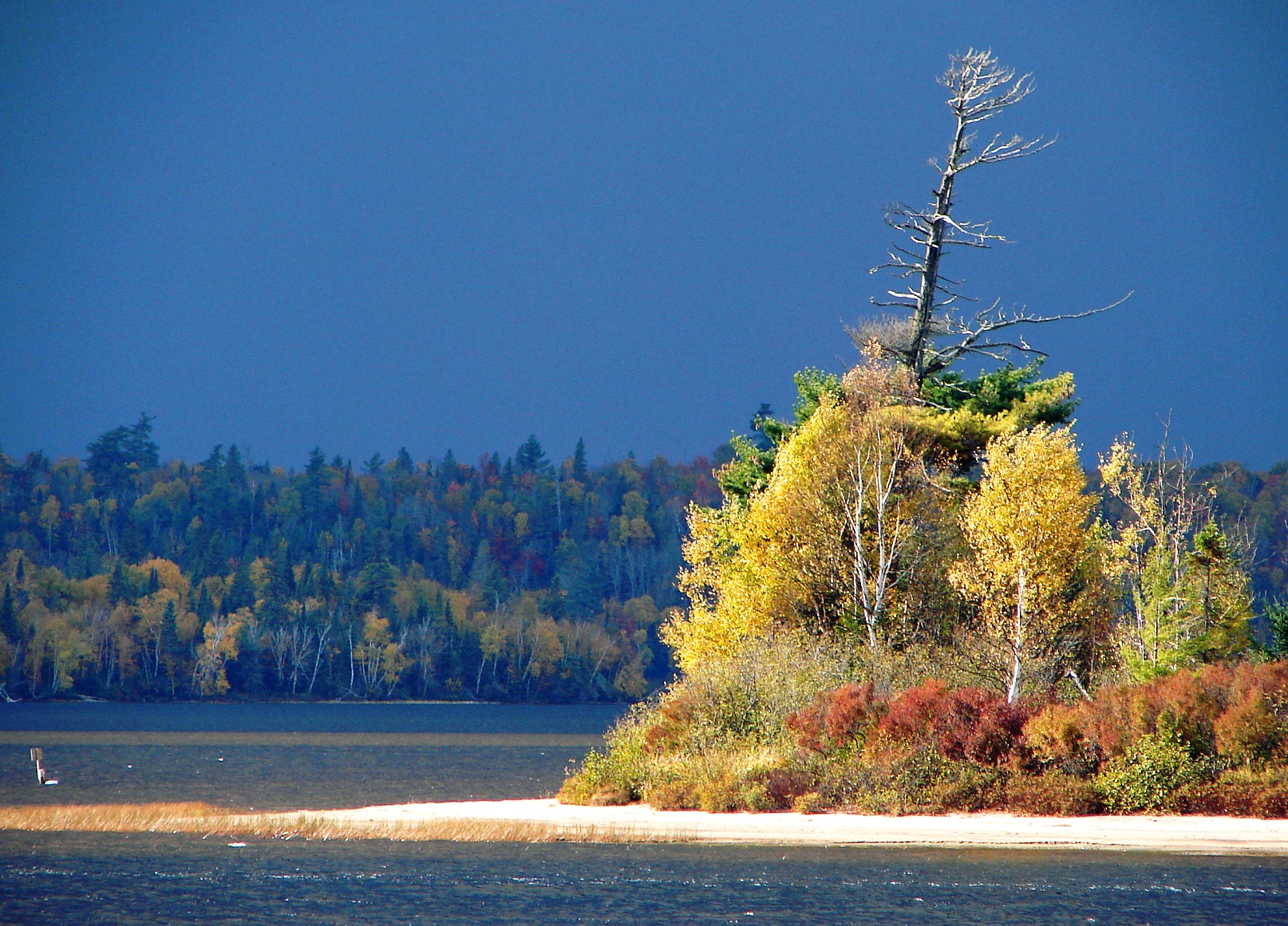
La Vérendrye Wildlife Reserve, Quebec

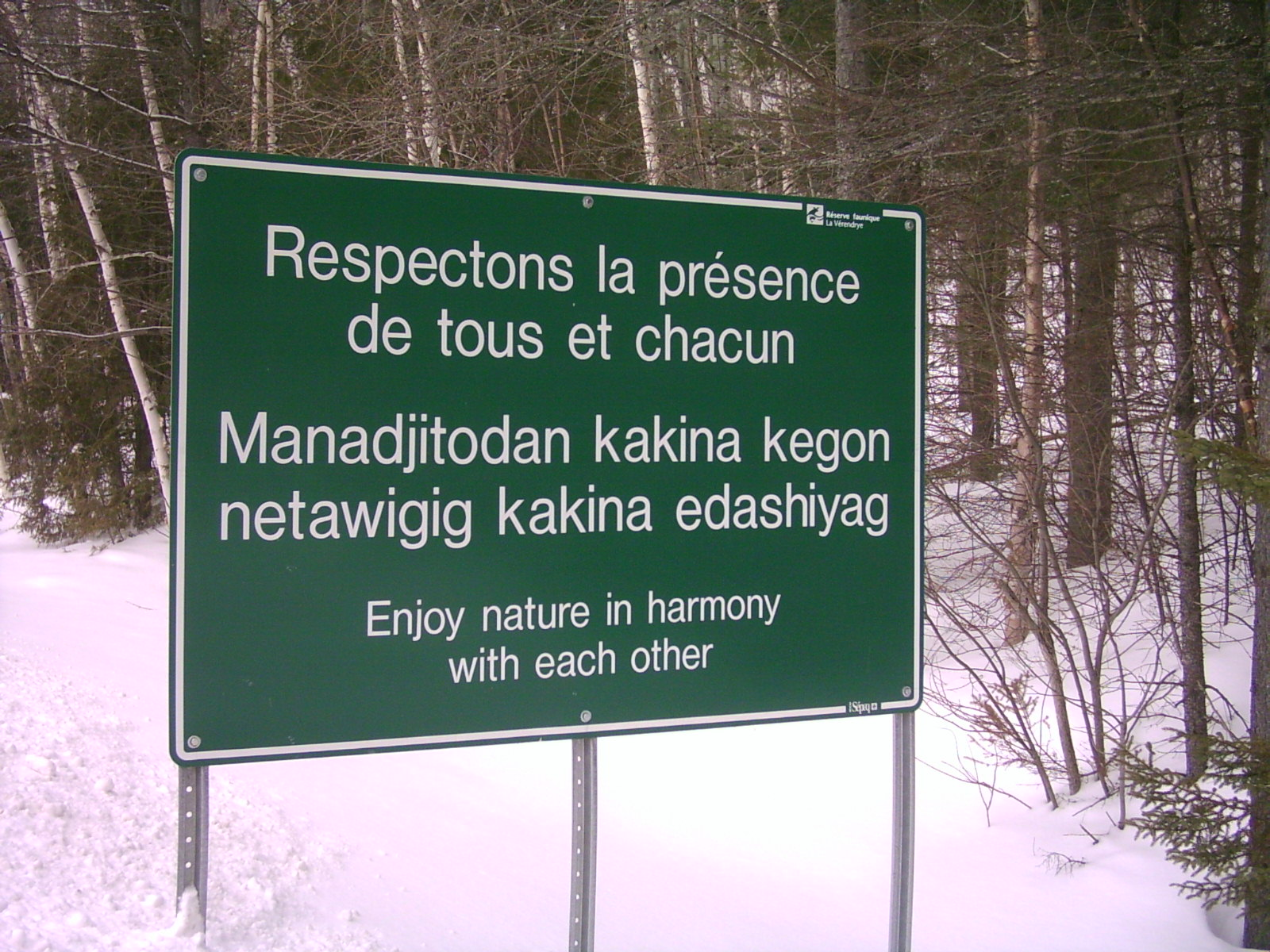
La Vérendrye Wildlife Reserve, Quebec

- Joseph-Émile Brunette's statue of Pierre Gaultier de Varennes, sieur de La Vérendrye, is located in Saint Boniface, Manitoba.

Numerous places were named in his honour:

- La Verendrye Provincial Park in Ontario
- La Vérendrye Wildlife Reserve in Quebec
- Boulevard de La Vérendrye in Montreal
- Boulevard La Vérendrye in Gatineau, Quebec
- The neighbourhood of Varennes in the St. Vital district of Winnipeg, rue La Vérendrye and Parc La Vérendrye in the Saint Boniface district in Winnipeg, and École LaVérendrye in the Earl Grey neighbourhood of Winnipeg
- La Vérendrye Hospital in Fort Frances, Ontario
- École Secondaire Catholique de LaVérendrye, Thunder Bay, Ontario
- Fort la Reine Museum, Portage la Prairie, Manitoba
- La Verendrye School, Portage la Prairie, Manitoba
- Verendrye, North Dakota - unofficial ghost town
- La Vérendrye Trail, Manitoba
- Mount Verendrye in British Columbia

== See also ==
- His four sons:
  - Jean Baptiste de La Vérendrye (b. 1713), killed by the Sioux
  - Pierre Gaultier de La Vérendrye (b. 1714)
  - François de La Vérendrye (b. 1715)
  - Louis-Joseph Gaultier de La Vérendrye (b. 1717), reached the Rocky Mountains
- Christopher Dufrost de La Jemeraye (his nephew, b. 1708)
- Jean-Pierre Aulneau, a missionary killed with Jean Baptiste de La Vérendrye
- Charles-Michel Mesaiger, another missionary
- French colonization of the Americas
- History of North Dakota
- Vérendrye site
