= Fort Kaministiquia =

French fort in North America

Coordinates: 48°23′36″N 89°14′23″W

- in northwestern Ontario, Canada
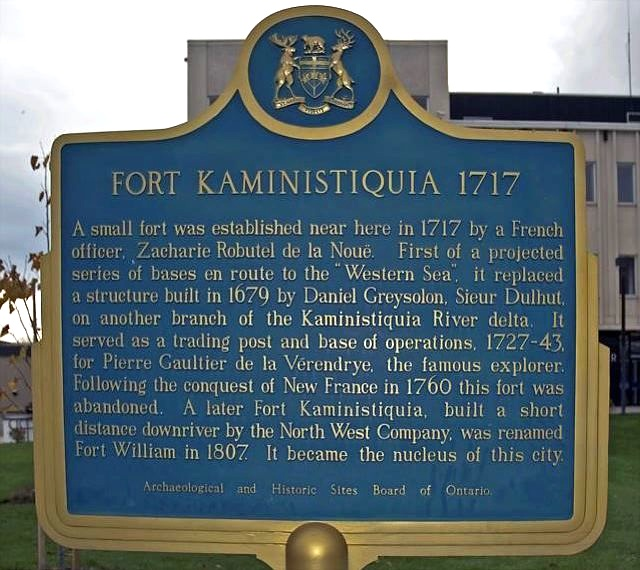

Site information
- Type: Fort
- Controlled by: Kingdom of France

Site history
- Built: 1717
- In use: until 1758 or 1760

Fort Kaministiquia (former spellings include Fort Camanistigoyan, Fort Kanastigoya, Fort Kamanastigoya and others), was a French fort in North America. It was located on the north shore of Lake Superior at the mouth of the Kaministiquia River, in modern-day Thunder Bay, Ontario, Canada. It and Grand Portage to the west were the starting points of the early Canadian canoe routes from the Great Lakes to western Canada. Details of the route can be found under Kaministiquia River.

In 1685 Daniel Greysolon, Sieur du Lhut built a post nearby. In 1688 Jacques de Noyon went from Kaministiquia as far as Rainy Lake. In 1696 the post was abandoned along with many western posts when the system of fur trade permits (congés) was abolished due to a surplus of beaver. In 1717 Zacharie Robutel de la Noue was sent west to find the western sea. It is not clear how far inland he got but he seems to have established Fort Kaministiquia and remained there until 1721. Coureurs des bois seem to have spread out from the fort, but we only know of them from rumors picked up by the English on Hudson Bay. Morton thinks they may have gotten as far as Lake Winnipeg. From 1919 it was one of the postes du nord which included a post on the Nipigon River and one at Michipicoten. La Vérendrye took over the postes du nord in 1728 and in 1731–1743 he pushed trade and exploration west beyond Lake Winnipeg, mainly via Grand Portage using Kaministiquia as a base. It was abandoned in 1758 or 1760 with the fall of New France.

Trade was open again by at least 1767, most likely using the easier Grand Portage. When the North West Company was driven out of Grand Portage (it was on the US side) they established Fort William on the site of Fort Kaministiquia. Whatever remains of the fort is probably buried under the town of Thunder Bay.

== Bibliography ==
- Dawson, Kenneth C. A. (1970). "Preliminary Archaeological Investigation of Fort William in Northwestern Ontario". Historical Archaeology. 4. Springer: 34–50. JSTOR 25615135.
- Losey, Elizabeth (1999). Let Them Be Remembered: The Story of the Fur Trade Forts. Vantage Press.
- Arthur S Morton, "A History of Western Canada", no date
- Morrison, Jean F. (2001). Superior Rendez-Vous Place: Fort William in the Canadian Fur Trade. Toronto: Natural Heritage Books. ISBN 1896219683.
