= Timeline of Winnipeg history =

This is a timeline of the history of Winnipeg.

== 18th century ==
- 1738 – The first French officer arrived in the area. Sieur de La Vérendrye built the first fur trading post on the site (Fort Rouge), which was later abandoned. The French traded in the area for several decades before Hudson's Bay Company traders arrived.
- 1767 – The first English traders visited the area about the year 1767.

== 19th century ==
- 1800s – Lord Selkirk was involved with the first permanent settlement (Red River Colony), the purchase of land from the Hudson's Bay Company, and a survey of river lots in the early 19th century.
- 1809 – Fort Gibraltar was built by the North West Company.
- 1812 – Fort Douglas was built by the Hudson's Bay Company.
- 1818 – The Catholic Church sent two missionaries, Norbert Provencher and Sévère Dumoulin, to the forks of the Assiniboine River and the Red River of the North. Their objective was to establish a permanent mission and to convert local Indigenous peoples.
- 1821 – The Hudson's Bay Company and North West Company ended their long rivalry with a merger. The two companies fought fiercely over trade in the area, and each destroyed some of the other's forts throughout several battles.
- 1822 – Fort Gibraltar, at the site of present-day Winnipeg, was renamed Fort Garry and became the leading post in the region for the Hudson's Bay Company.
- 1826 – 1826 Red River flood destroys Fort Gibraltar, and it was not rebuilt until 1835. The fort was the residence of the Governor of the Hudson's Bay Company for many years.
- 1869–70 – Winnipeg was the site of the Red River Rebellion, a conflict between the local provisional government of Métis, led by Louis Riel, and the newcomers from eastern Canada. General Garnet Wolseley was sent to put down the rebellion. This rebellion led directly to the Manitoba Act and Manitoba's entry into the Confederation as Canada's fifth province in 1870.
- 1873 – On November 8, Winnipeg was incorporated as a city.
- 1874 – On January 5, Francis Evans Cornish, former mayor of London, Ontario, defeated Winnipeg Free Press editor and owner William F. Luxton by a margin of 383 votes to 179. There were only 382 eligible voters in the city at the time, but property owners were allowed to vote in every civic poll in which they owned property. Until 1955, mayors could only serve one term. City government consisted of 13 aldermen and one mayor; this number of elected officials remained constant until 1920.
- 1875 – Construction of a new City Hall commenced. The building proved to be a structural nightmare, and eventually had to be held up by props and beams. The building was eventually demolished so that a new City Hall could be built in 1883.
- 1876 – The post office officially adopted the name "Winnipeg".
- 1877 – The first locomotive in Winnipeg, the Countess of Dufferin, arrived via steamboat in 1877.
- 1881
  - The Canadian Pacific Railway completed the first direct rail link from eastern Canada, opening the door to mass immigration and settlement of Winnipeg and the Canadian Prairies. The history of Winnipeg's rail heritage and the Countess of Dufferin may be seen at the Winnipeg Railway Museum.
  - The city's population grew from 25,000 in 1891 to more than 179,000 in 1921.
- 1882
  - Winnipeg Transit founded.
  - Winnipeg Fire Department established.
- 1886 – A new City Hall building was constructed. It was a "gingerbread" building, built with Victorian grandeur, and symbolized Winnipeg's coming of age at the end of the 19th century. In 1958, falling plaster almost hit visitors to the City Hall building. The tower eventually had to be removed, and in 1962, the whole building was torn down.

== 20th century ==
- 1904
  - Assiniboine Park opened.
  - The building of The Firefighters Museum constructed.
- 1909 – Shea's Amphitheatre constructed.
- 1911 – Winnipeg Falcons founded.
- 1912 – Winnipeg Art Gallery founded.
- 1914 – Winnipeg faced financial difficulty when the Panama Canal opened in 1914. The canal reduced reliance on Canada's rail system for international trade, and the increase in ship traffic helped Vancouver surpass Winnipeg to become Canada's third-largest city in the 1960s.
- 1919 – 35,000 Winnipeggers walked off the job in May in what came to be known as the Winnipeg General Strike of 1919. After many arrests, deportations, and incidents of violence, the strike ended on June 21, 1919, when the Riot Act was read and a group of Royal Canadian Mounted Police (RCMP) officers charged a group of strikers.
- 1920
  - Completed in 1920, the Manitoba Legislative Building reflects the optimism of the boom years.
  - Single Transferable Voting brought into use for the election of Winnipeg MLAs, and also the for election of Winnipeg city councillors.
  - Built mainly of Tyndall Stone and opened in 1920, its dome supports a bronze statue finished in gold leaf titled, "Eternal Youth and the Spirit of Enterprise" (commonly known as the "Golden Boy"). The Manitoba Legislature was built in the neoclassical style that is common to many other North American state and provincial legislative buildings of the 19th century and early 20th century. The Legislature was built to accommodate representatives for three million people, which was the expected population of Manitoba at the time.
- 1928 – Winnipeg James Armstrong Richardson International Airport opened.
- 1934 – Battle at Old Market Square
- 1950 – 1950 Red River flood, the largest flood to hit Winnipeg since 1861; the flood held waters above flood stage for 51 days.
- 1952 – Winnipeg Enterprises Corp. established.
- 1955 – Winnipeg Arena opened.
- 1956 – Winnipeg Declaration.
- 1958 - The Manitoba Theatre Centre established.
- 1967 – The Civic Centre and the Manitoba Centennial Centre were connected by tunnels in 1967.
- 1974 – Winnipeg Film Group established.
- 1979 – The Eaton's catalog building was converted into the first downtown mall in the city. It was called Eaton Place, but would change its name to Cityplace following the controversial demolition of the empty Eaton's store in 2002.
- 1989 – The reclamation and redevelopment of the CNR rail yards at the junction of the Red and Assiniboine rivers turned The Forks into Winnipeg's most popular tourist attraction.
- 1992 – The Leo Mol Sculpture Garden in Winnipeg's Assiniboine Park was unveiled.
- 1993 – Feeling that their community needs were not being fulfilled, the residents of Headingley seceded from Winnipeg and officially became incorporated as a municipality.
- 1996 – Winnipeg's National Hockey League team (the Winnipeg Jets) left for Phoenix, Arizona.
- 1997 – During the 1997 Red River flood, the floodway was pushed to its limits. The Red River Floodway Expansion is set to be completed in late 2010 at a final cost of more than $665,000,000 CAD.

== 21st century ==
- 2004 - Canada Life Centre (then called MTS Centre) opens in downtown Winnipeg.
- 2011 – The National Hockey League approves the sale and relocation of the Atlanta Thrashers by True North Sports & Entertainment; the hockey club comes to be known as the Winnipeg Jets, ending 15 years without NHL hockey in the city.
- 2013 - IG Field opens.
- 2014 - Canadian Museum for Human Rights, the first national museum outside Ottawa, opens.
- 2015 - 2015 FIFA Women's World Cup.
- 2020 - COVID-19 pandemic in Winnipeg.
- 2021 - Qaumajuk, the new building dedicated to Inuit art opens at the Winnipeg Art Gallery.
- 2023 - 2023 World Police and Fire Games.

== See also ==
- History of Winnipeg
