= World Firefighters Games =

The World Firefighters Games is an international sporting event that welcomes all full-time, part-time and volunteer structural firefighters, aviation fire services, emergency response personnel and their direct family from all across the globe.

The games are held biennially and offer more than 50 different sports and challenges including archery, rugby sevens, windsurfing, poker, swimming, athletics and softball, with the "Toughest Firefighter Alive" being the blue riband event.

== Purpose ==
The games began in 1988 with the first ever World Firefighters Games held in Auckland, New Zealand, from 22 to 29 April 1990. This initial outing drew 1800 athletes and 1400 supporters from 17 countries. The purpose of the games was to introduce the four following concepts within the services:

1. To promote health and fitness
2. To provide a forum for information exchange between fire services
3. To foster comradeship amongst firefighters
4. To encourage family participation

The motivation behind the games was to overcome some of the problems with entering the World Police and Fire Games, in that the games are only open to full-time paid firefighters. As most fire services globally use volunteer personnel the World Firefighters Games allows entrants that are full-time, part-time and volunteer, as well as the families of fire service personnel to enter.

After the first games, an attempt was made to register the name to seek profit. When the games were held in Perth in 1994, the organising committee felt so strongly about the games belonging to the firefighter that they bought the rights from the original owners and Perth has become the home of the world governing body, "World Firefighters Games WA Inc". The governing body licenses each fire department and allows use of the name and branding for the running of the event. The governing body is entirely a non-profit organization and all proceeds are donated to charity. The largest games to date were held in Chungj, from 10–18 September 2018 with approximately 6,600 athletes and 20,000 spectators.

== Toughest Firefighter Alive ==
The Toughest Firefighter Alive, which is specific to the World Firefighters Games, is carried out in full firefighting kit and tests competitors in a number of firefighting-specific disciplines. There are four different categories.

1. The hose run, carrying a BA set.

2. Obstacle course: competitors are required to carry various pieces of equipment whilst negotiating tunnels and walls.

3. Tower: competitors are required to handle and pitch ladders and to carry firefighting equipment up ropes.

4. Stair climb: competitors are required to climb to the top of a tower, the height of which can vary depending on the country but will normally vary from 100 to 200 m.

== Games ==
- 1990. Auckland, New Zealand 22 to 29 April – 1,800 athletes, 17 countries, 34 events. Winners: New Zealand
- 1992. Las Vegas, United States 16 to 22 May – 4,000 athletes, 22 countries, 45 events. Winners: United States
- 1994. Perth, Australia 20 to 26 March – 2,000 athletes, 21 countries, 48 events. Winners: Australia
- 1996. Edmonton, Canada 28 July to 3 August, 2,300 athletes, 25 countries, 54 events. Winners: Canada
- 1998. Durban, South Africa 17 to 23 May – 1,800 athletes, 26 countries, 55 events. Winners: South Africa
- 2000. Mantes-La-Jolie, France 6 to 13 July – 4,000 athletes, 56 countries, 61 events. Winners: France
- 2002. Christchurch, New Zealand 26 October to 2 November – 1,500 athletes, 30 countries, 58 events. Winners: New Zealand Fire Service
- 2004. Sheffield, England 28 August to 4 September – 2,500 athletes, 40 countries, 59 events. Winners: England
- 2006. Hong Kong 18 to 25 February – 3,000 athletes, 37 countries, 59 events. Winners: China
- 2008. Liverpool, England 25 August to 3 September – 3,000 athletes, 46 countries, 74 events. Winners: England
- 2010. Daegu, South Korea, 21–29 August – 5,230 participants, 46 countries, 75 events. Winners Korean Fire Service
- 2012. Sydney, Australia, 19–28 October – 1,500 athletes, 30 countries, 60 events. Winners: Australia (the Sydney 2012 World Firefighters Games were conducted by WFG Events Pty Ltd under Licence from World Firefighters Games WA Inc)
- 2018. Chungju, South Korea, 10–17 September 2018. The largest number of competitors to attend the games 6,600
- 2020. Aalborg, Denmark, postponed to 2024
- 2022. Lisbon, Portugal, 30 April – 7 May 2022. The games returned post COVID-19 with over 40 countries in attendance.
- 2024. Aalborg, Denmark, 7 to 14 September 2024
- 2026. Khobar, Saudi Arabia, 5 to 13 November 2026

Edition	Year	City	Country
1	1990	Auckland	New Zealand
2	1992	Las Vegas	United States
3	1994	Perth	Australia
4	1996	Edmonton	Canada
5	1998	Durban	South Africa
6	2000	Mantes-La-Jolie	France
7	2002	Christchurch	New Zealand
8	2004	Sheffield	England
9	2006	Hong Kong	Hong Kong
10	2008	Liverpool	England
11	2010	Daegu	South Korea
12	2012	Sydney	Australia
Cancelled	2014	Las Vegas	United States
13	2018	Chungju	South Korea
Deferred due to COVID Pandemic	2024	Aalborg	Denmark
14	2022	Lisbon	Portugal
15	2024	Aalborg	Denmark
16	2026	Khobar	Saudi Arabia

== Results ==
- http://worldfirefightersgames.com/
- https://web.archive.org/web/20191020073402/http://worldfirefightersgames.com/index.php/game-stats/previous-games/1990-games/1990-results
- https://web.archive.org/web/20191020073345/http://worldfirefightersgames.com/index.php/game-stats/previous-games/1992-games/1992-results - Incomplete
- https://web.archive.org/web/20191020073458/http://worldfirefightersgames.com/index.php/game-stats/previous-games/1994-games/1994-results
- https://web.archive.org/web/20191020073317/http://worldfirefightersgames.com/index.php/game-stats/previous-games/1996-games/1996-results
- https://web.archive.org/web/20191020073257/http://worldfirefightersgames.com/index.php/game-stats/previous-games/1998-games/1998-results
- https://web.archive.org/web/20191020073259/http://worldfirefightersgames.com/index.php/game-stats/previous-games/2000-games/2000-results
- https://web.archive.org/web/20191020073300/http://worldfirefightersgames.com/index.php/game-stats/previous-games/2002-games/2002-results
- https://web.archive.org/web/20191020073312/http://worldfirefightersgames.com/index.php/game-stats/previous-games/2004-games/2004-results
- https://web.archive.org/web/20191020073308/http://worldfirefightersgames.com/index.php/game-stats/previous-games/2006-games/2006-results
- https://web.archive.org/web/20191020073136/http://worldfirefightersgames.com/index.php/game-stats/previous-games/2008-games/2008-results
- https://web.archive.org/web/20191020071916/http://worldfirefightersgames.com/index.php/game-stats/previous-games/2010-games/2010-results
- https://web.archive.org/web/20191020071927/http://worldfirefightersgames.com/index.php/game-stats/previous-games/2012-games/2012-results
- https://web.archive.org/web/20191020074223/http://worldfirefightersgames.com/index.php/game-stats/previous-games/2014-games - Cancelled
- https://web.archive.org/web/20191020073607/http://worldfirefightersgames.com/index.php/game-stats/previous-games/2018-games - Have Not Medal Table
- https://web.archive.org/web/20190618182228/http://overseas.mofa.go.kr/au-en/brd/m_3304/view.do?seq=756602&srchFr=&amp%3BsrchTo=&amp%3BsrchWord=&amp%3BsrchTp=&amp%3Bmulti_itm_seq=0&amp%3Bitm_seq_1=0&amp%3Bitm_seq_2=0&amp%3Bcompany_cd=&amp%3Bcompany_nm=&page=5 - The 13th World Firefighters Games Chungju, 2018
- https://web.archive.org/web/20180814195906/http://wfg2018.chungbuk.go.kr/eng/index.php
- https://web.archive.org/web/20180525223525/http://wfg2018.chungbuk.go.kr/eng/sub.php?code=02_info04
- https://web.archive.org/web/20181108191339/http://wfg2018.chungbuk.go.kr/eng/sub.php?code=02_info030101
- https://web.archive.org/web/20181022152728/http://wfg2018s.chungbuk.go.kr/event/sub.php?menukey=519 - 2018 Nations Medal Table
- https://web.archive.org/web/20181108192005/http://wfg2018s.chungbuk.go.kr/event/sub.php?menukey=519&mod=list2 - 2018 Clubs Medal Table
- https://web.archive.org/web/20181108191942/http://wfg2018s.chungbuk.go.kr/event/sub.php?menukey=519&mod=list3 - 2018 Sports Medal Table

== Events ==
The core sports of the games are archery, arm wrestling, badminton, basketball (3:5, 5:5), bodybuilding, ten-pin bowling, bucket brigade, cross country running, cycling, climbing, darts, eight-ball, nine-ball, golf, horseshoes, judo, karate, bowls, marathon, half marathon, poker, powerlifting, rugby sevens, sailing, skeet shooting, soccer, fastpitch softball, softball, squash, swimming, table tennis, tennis, Toughest Firefighter Alive, track and field, trap shooting, triathlon, tug of war, volleyball (2 man/ 6 man), windsurfing, and wrestling.

Host countries will vary the events depending on their national games, traditions, and culture.
