= World Police and Fire Games =

Sporting events for police officers, firefighters and paramedics

- Status: Active
- Genre: Various sporting events
- Frequency: Biennial
- Location: Various
- Inaugurated: 1985

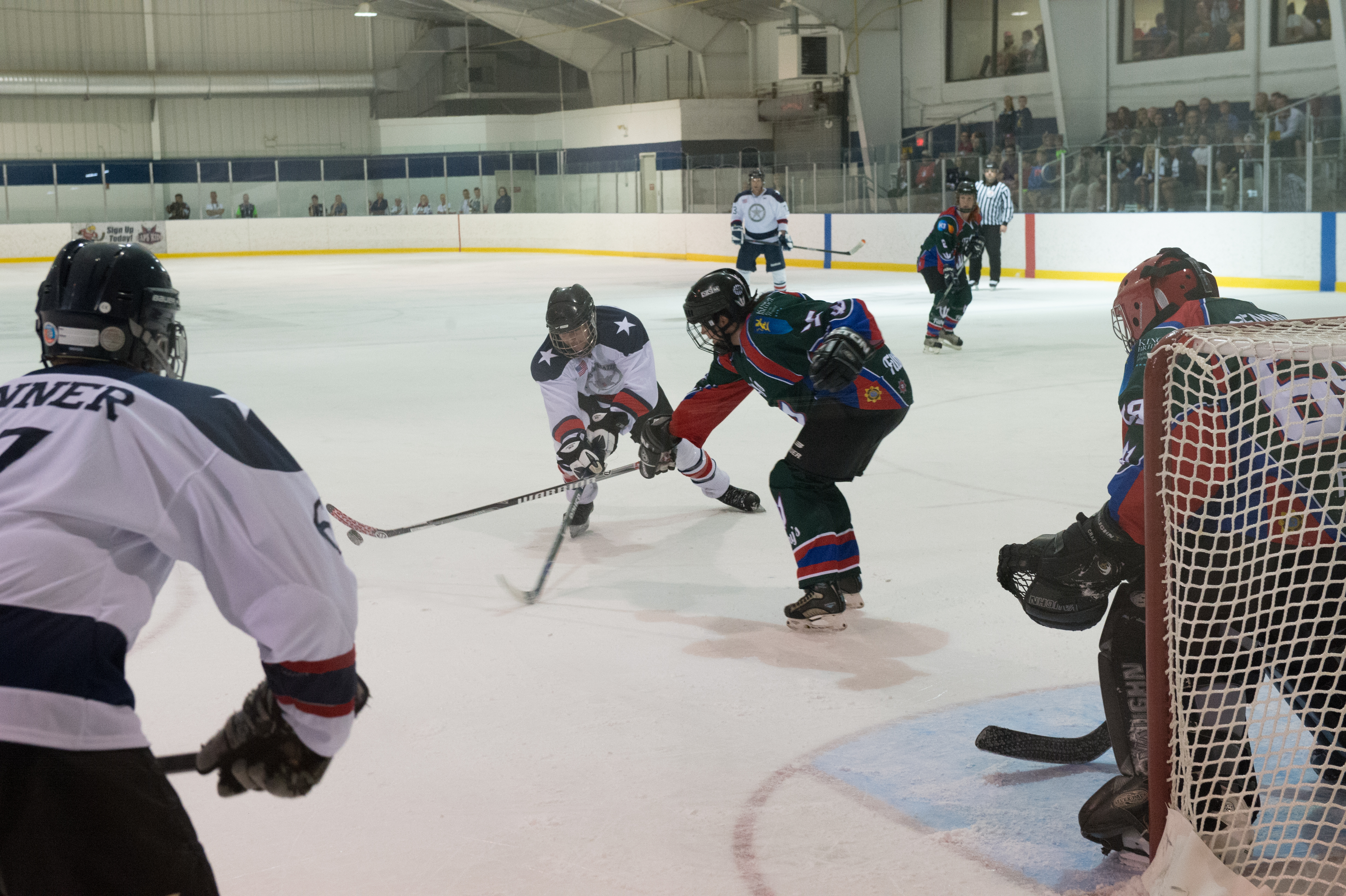
Ice Hockey at the 2015 games in Fairfax, Virginia

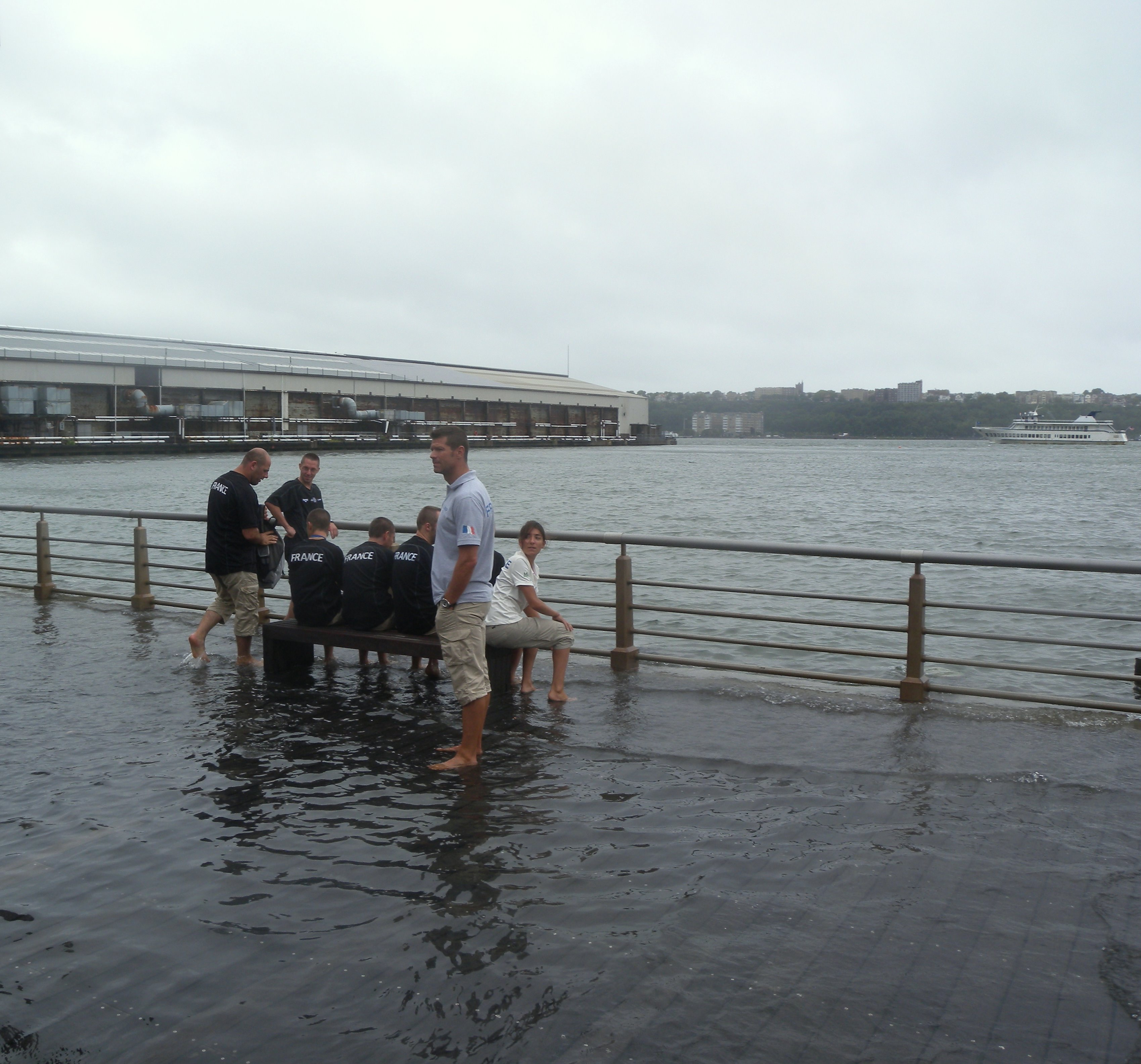
French team in New York on a day Hurricane Irene cancelled competition in 2011

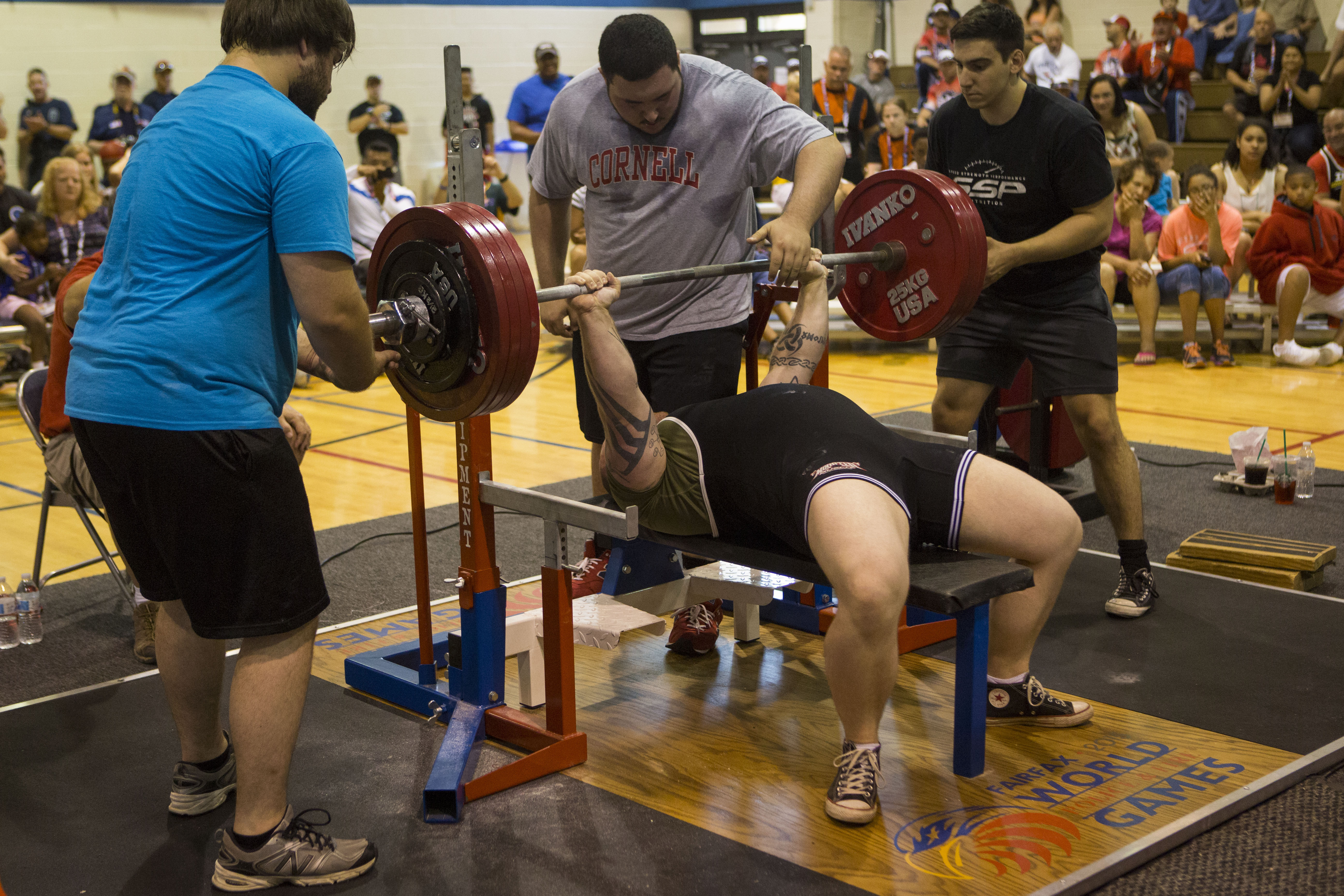
Border Patrol Agent Matt Phelps completes his successful attempt for a World Record bench press of 551lbs at the 2015 WPFG in Herndon, Virginia

The World Police and Fire Games (WPFG) is a biennial athletic event open to active and retired law enforcement and fire service personnel throughout the world. The WPFG Federation is an arm of the California Police Athletic Federation (CPAF), an American non-profit organization.

The Games attract approximately 10,000 entrants, fewer than the Summer Olympic Games, and exceeding the third position holder, the Commonwealth Games. In the early 2010s, the United Kingdom hosted all three events consecutively; the 2012 Summer Olympics in London, followed by the 2013 World Police and Fire Games in Belfast, and ending with Glasgow, hosting the 2014 Commonwealth Games. The host city of the 2015 World Police and Fire Game was Fairfax County, Virginia, with venues located around the Washington metropolitan area. In 2017, the Games were scheduled to be held in the city of Montreal. However, Montreal backed out of their hosting duties after a labour dispute between the city and its fire department. The Games were rescheduled and successfully held in Los Angeles. In 2019, the host city was Chengdu. The WPFG 2021 were postponed because of the COVID-19 pandemic. In 2022, the host city was Rotterdam. The 2023 Games were hosted in Winnipeg, Manitoba, and the 2025 in Birmingham, Alabama.

== History ==
The California Police Olympics were first held in 1967. The concept evolved over the years and led to the creation of the World Police & Fire Games Federation—a non-profit organization, run by the Californian Police Athletics Federation—in 1983. Two years later, in 1985, the first World Police & Fire Games were held in San Jose, California, USA, with nearly 5,000 competitors.

The largest WPFG games to date was held in New York, New York, USA with over 16,000 athletes in attendance, from 59 nations. The most successful and best organised was in Belfast, Northern Ireland in 2013. It was described, by the President of the World Police and Fire Games Federation, Mike Graham, as "the friendliest and best Games ever". The Montreal Firefighters Association called for a boycott of the 2017 Games, which were held in their own city, in protest against forced changes to collective agreements and pension funds. Labor unions representing over 100,000 firefighters and civil servants joined the boycott.

== Games ==
Edition	Year	City	Country	Results
1	1985	San Jose, California	United States	
2	1987	San Diego, California	United States	
3	1989	Vancouver	Canada	
4	1991	Memphis, Tennessee	United States	
5	1993	Colorado Springs	United States	
6	1995	Melbourne	Australia	
7	1997	Calgary	Canada	
8	1999	Stockholm	Sweden	
9	2001	Indianapolis	United States	
10	2003	Barcelona	Spain	
11	2005	Québec City	Canada	
12	2007	Adelaide	Australia	
13	2009	Vancouver	Canada	
14	2011	New York City	United States	
15	2013	Belfast	United Kingdom	
16	2015	Fairfax County, Virginia	United States	
17	2017	Los Angeles	United States	
18	2019	Chengdu	China	
19	2022	Rotterdam	Netherlands	
20	2023	Winnipeg	Canada	TBD
21	2025	Birmingham	United States	TBD
22	2027	Perth	Australia	TBD
23	2029	Ahmedabad	India	TBD

== See also ==
- World Firefighters Games
- Military World Games
- World Police Indoor Soccer Tournament
- World Police Concert
