= 2023 World Police and Fire Games =

- Host city: Winnipeg, Manitoba
- Country: Canada
- Nations: 50+
- Athletes: 8,500
- Events: 60
- Opening: 28 July
- Closing: 6 August
- Main venue: Canada Life Centre

The 2023 World Police and Fire Games were held in Winnipeg, Manitoba from July 28 to August 6. The event featured 8,500 athletes from over 70 countries in 60 different sports. 2,800 volunteers helped to run the games in 2023.

== Venues ==
- Canada Life Centre - Winnipeg (Opening ceremony)
- 300 Main Street - Winnipeg (Stair race)
- Memorial Boulevard - Winnipeg (Muster, ultimate firefighter)
- RBC Convention Centre - Winnipeg (Bench press, boxing, cornhole, CrossFit, dodgeball, jiu jitsu, judo, karate, push-pull lifting, indoor rowing, table tennis, wrestling)
- The Forks - Winnipeg (Wrist wrestling, athletes village)
- The Met - Winnipeg (Body building)
- Bison Butte - Winnipeg (Cycling)
- Dakota Community Centre - Winnipeg (Pickleball, ice hockey, volleyball)
- Manitoba Canoe and Kayak Centre - Winnipeg (Dragon boat)
- Maple Grove Park - Winnipeg (Field lacrosse, flag football, rugby 7s, ultimate frisbee, tug-of-war)
- St. Vital Curling Club - Winnipeg (Curling)
- St. Vital Park - Winnipeg (Half marathon)
- Pan Am Pool - Winnipeg (Swimming)
- University of Manitoba - Winnipeg (Toughest competitor alive)
- University of Manitoba Investors Group Athletic Centre - Winnipeg (Basketball)
- University of Manitoba Stadium - Winnipeg (Decathlon, athletics)
- Winnipeg Lawn Tennis Club - Winnipeg (Tennis)

== Sports ==
- Angling
- Archery
- Athletics
- Basketball
- Beach volleyball
- Benchpress
- Biathlon
- Body building
- Bowling
- Boxing
- Canoe/Kayak
- CrossFit
- Curling
- Cycling
- Darts
- Dodgeball
- Dragonboat
- Golf
- Half marathon
- Ice hockey
- Indoor rowing
- Jiu jitsu
- Judo
- Karate
- Lacrosse
- Muster
- Pickleball
- Pistol shooting
- Push-pull lifting
- Rifle shooting
- Rugby 7s
- Skeet shooting
- Soccer
- Softball
- Stair racing
- Surfing* (in Hawaii before the games)
- Swimming
- Table tennis
- Tennis
- Toughest competitor alive
- Triathlon
- Ultimate firefighter
- Ultimate frisbee
- Volleyball
- Wrestling
- Wrist wrestling

== Participating regions ==
- Australia
- Belgium
- Brazil
- Canada (Host)
- France
- Hong Kong, China (287)
- Iceland
- The Netherlands
- Spain
- United States

== Medal table ==
* Host nation (Canada)

Rank	Nation	Gold	Silver	Bronze	Total
1	United States (USA)	343	195	142	680
2	Canada (CAN)*	270	239	173	682
3	India (IND)	216	105	54	375
4	Brazil (BRA)	135	129	102	366
5	Hong Kong (HKG)	84	81	87	252
6	Spain (ESP)	68	48	32	148
7	Great Britain (GBR)	59	23	17	99
8	Germany (GER)	49	36	23	108
9	Australia (AUS)	47	37	21	105
10	Malaysia (MAS)	34	37	17	88
11	Taiwan (TAI)	34	35	21	90
12	United Arab Emirates (UAE)	33	27	20	80
13	Belgium (BEL)	31	22	14	67
14	Cambodia (CAM)	28	26	8	62
15	Ireland (IRE)	24	8	8	40
16	Mexico (MEX)	20	20	12	52
17	Philippines (PHI)	20	18	7	45
18	Czech Republic (CZE)	20	6	2	28
19	Netherlands (NED)	19	18	7	44
20	Poland (POL)	16	7	7	30
21	Slovakia (SVK)	12	3	3	18
22	Mongolia (MNG)	10	5	1	16
23	France (FRA)	9	12	13	34
24	Romania (ROM)	7	9	6	22
25	Iceland (ISL)	5	2	3	10
26	Latvia (LAT)	5	1	1	7
27	Switzerland (SUI)	4	3	3	10
28	New Zealand (NZL)	4	3	1	8
29	Sweden (SWE)	4	2	2	8
30	French Guiana (GUF)	4	1	0	5
30	Northern Ireland (NIR)	4	1	0	5
32	Italy (ITA)	3	4	1	8
33	China (CHN)	3	2	0	5
34	Greece (GRE)	3	1	0	4
35	Ecuador (ECU)	2	3	3	8
36	Austria (AUT)	2	3	2	7
36	Trinidad and Tobago (TRI)	2	3	2	7
38	French Polynesia (PYF)	2	2	0	4
39	Hungary (HUN)	2	0	2	4
40	Croatia (CRO)	1	3	0	4
41	Isle of Man (IOM)	1	2	1	4
42	Finland (FIN)	1	1	0	2
43	Lithuania (LIT)	1	0	2	3
44	Estonia (EST)	1	0	0	1
44	Kosovo (KOS)	1	0	0	1
44	Vietnam (VIE)	1	0	0	1
47	Israel (ISR)	0	2	0	2
48	Portugal (POR)	0	1	2	3
49	Kazakhstan (KAZ)	0	1	0	1
50	South Korea (KOR)	0	0	1	1
50	Uganda (UGA)	0	0	1	1
Totals (51 entries)		1,644	1,187	824	3,655

=== Top 25 agencies by total medals ===
Rank	Delegation	Gold	Silver	Bronze	Total
1	India National Police	175	65	31	271
2	Hong Kong Police Force	80	74	67	221
3	(Brazil) Brasilia State Police	40	43	38	121
4	(Canada) Royal Canadian Mounted Police	29	32	21	82
5	(United Arab Emirates) Abu Dhabi Police Force	29	24	20	73
6	National Police of Cambodia	28	26	8	62
7	(Brazil) Corpo de Bombeiros Militaro Do Distro Federal	28	21	18	67
8	(Taiwan) Chinese Taipei National Police	24	23	15	62
9	(Belgium) Brussels Fire Department	19	10	7	36
10	(Brazil) Corpo de Bombeiros Militar de Rio de Janeiro	19	9	3	31
11	Brazil Military Police	15	7	6	28
12	(India) HM Prison Service - Great Britain	15	4	3	22
13	Malaysia Fire & Rescue	14	18	10	42
14	(Canada) Royal Canadian Mounted Police 2	14	7	10	31
15	(Republic of Ireland) Garda Síochána	14	7	4	25
16	(United States) Los Angeles Police Department	14	6	8	28
17	(Malaysia) Royal Malaysian Police Service	13	9	2	24
18	(Philippines) Philippine National Police	11	8	6	25
19	Taiwan Fire Department	10	11	5	26
20	(India) Tamil Nadu Police Department	10	8	10	28
21	(Canada) Winnipeg Police Department*	9	14	9	32
22	(Canada) Winnipeg Fire Paramedic Service*	9	9	6	24
23	(Canada) Toronto Police Service	8	17	8	33
24	(Canada) Winnipeg Fire Department*	7	12	8	27
25	(Malaysia) Royal Malaysian Police Service 2	7	10	5	22
Totals (25 entries)		641	474	328	1,443
