= Fort Rouge (fortification) =

1738–1749 Canadian trading fort

Coordinates: 49.888°N 97.131°W

- in Assiniboine River in Winnipeg, Manitoba, Canada

Site information
- Type: depot

Site history
- Built: 1738
- In use: 1738–1749

National Historic Site of Canada
- Official name: Forts Rouge, Garry, and Gibraltar National Historic Site of Canada
- Designated: 1924

Fort Rouge was a fort located on the Assiniboine River in Manitoba, Canada, on the site of what is now the city of Winnipeg. Its exact location is unknown. Its name in English means "red fort".

In 1738 Sieur Louis Damours de Louvières built Fort Rouge on the Assiniboine River for Pierre Gaultier de Varennes, sieur de La Vérendrye. La Vérendrye and his sons, Louis-Joseph and François, proceeded further west on the Assiniboine and constructed Fort La Reine. The fort seems to have had a primary purpose as a depot and was abandoned by 1749.

A new commandant of the French western forts, Jacques Legardeur de Saint-Pierre, spent the winter of 1752–1753 at the Forks, and likely rebuilt Fort Rouge at its original location. Much research points to this site being on the north bank of the Assiniboine near the forks although some scholars place the original fort on the south bank.

Trading posts were built near Fort Rouge by Bruce and Boyer in 1780 and by Alexander Henry the younger in 1803, as was Fort Gibraltar in 1807.

The district of Fort Rouge in south-central Winnipeg is named for the fort.

A site near Winnipeg's Union Station, believed to be the location of Fort Rouge, was designated a National Historic Site in 1924 as part of the "Forts Rouge, Garry, and Gibraltar National Historic Site of Canada".

== See also ==
- Council of Keewatin
- Fort Garry
- History of Winnipeg
- Temporary North-West Council
