= Fort Garry =

Historic trading post in present-day downtown Winnipeg, Manitoba, Canada

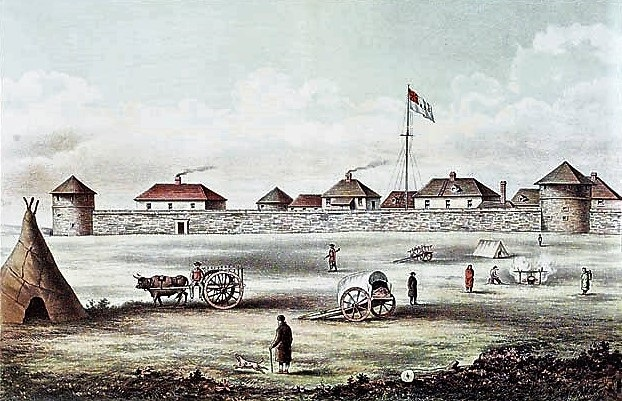
- Fort Garry in c. 1880s

- Location within Manitoba
- 49.887883°N 97.135320°W
- Location: Winnipeg, Manitoba, Canada

History
- Built: 1822
- Built for: Hudson's Bay Company
- Original use: Trading post
- Demolished: 1826; 1880s (Note: The original fort was destroyed by flooding in 1826. The second fort was demolished in the 1880s.)
- Rebuilt: 1836

National Historic Site of Canada
- Official name: Forts Rouge, Garry, and Gibraltar National Historic Site of Canada
- Designated: 4 June 1924
- Public transit: Winnipeg Transit; BLUE FX2 FX3 D14 D15

Fort Garry, also known as Upper Fort Garry, was a Hudson's Bay Company trading post located at the confluence of the Red and Assiniboine rivers in or near the area now known as The Forks in what is now central Winnipeg, Manitoba.

Fort Garry was established in 1822, although its first iteration was destroyed in 1826 by severe flooding. The trading post was rebuilt in 1836 and served as the administrative centre for the Red River Colony. From 1869 to 1870, the fort was briefly occupied by Louis Riel and his Métis followers during the Red River Rebellion. The fort was demolished in the 1880s to make way for Winnipeg's Main Street, although the fort's gate remains.

The site of the former fort was designated as a part of a larger National Historic Site in 1924. Development of a provincial heritage site on the historic site of Fort Garry began in the early 21st century.

== Site ==
Upper Fort Garry was established near the confluence of the Red and Assiniboine rivers, at a site that had served as an Indigenous gathering place, trading centre, and transportation hub for thousands of years before European settlement. The location provided access to major river and overland trade routes linking Hudson Bay with the North American interior and the northern Great Plains, making it an ideal location for the Hudson's Bay Company's commercial, administrative, and transportation operations.

Today, the site occupies a city block in downtown Winnipeg, bounded by Main Street to the east, Assiniboine Avenue to the south, Fort Street to the west, and Broadway to the north. It lies immediately south of the Manitoba Club, across Main Street from the Fort Garry Hotel, and just south of The Forks.

== Construction and architecture ==
Fort Garry was established by the Hudson's Bay Company in 1822 on or near the former site of the North West Company's Fort Gibraltar. Four years later, the Red River Flood of 1826 destroyed the fort.

The Hudson's Bay Company rebuilt the fort in 1835–1836 to meet the administrative and supply needs of the Red River Settlement. The rebuilt post became known as Upper Fort Garry to distinguish it from Lower Fort Garry, which had been established in 1831 approximately 32 kilometres (20 mi) downriver. Upper Fort Garry was not completed as a single building project. From 1835 to 1887, its structures were built, enlarged, relocated, adapted to different uses, and demolished.

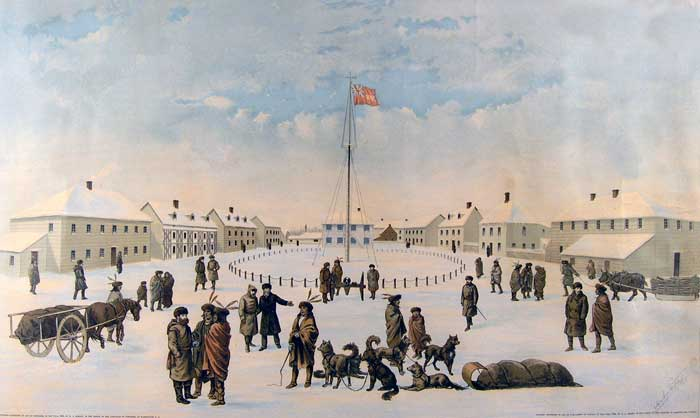
Inside Fort Garry in 1884. The fort was demolished during that decade.

The fort formed a nearly rectangular enclosure measuring approximately 88 by 75 metres (289 by 246 ft). Stone walls approximately 3.6 metres (12 ft) high and 0.9 metres (3.0 ft) thick surrounded the enclosure. Four circular stone bastions stood at its corners, and timber galleries ran along the inner sides of the walls. Warehouses, stores, offices, workshops, and residences stood around a central courtyard. These buildings were repeatedly altered as the fort's commercial, administrative, political, and military uses changed during the nineteenth century.

Most of Upper Fort Garry was demolished from 1881 to 1884 to straighten Main Street as Winnipeg expanded. The stone Governor's Gate is the only surviving above-ground structure from the fort.

== History ==
Fort Garry was named after Nicholas Garry, deputy governor of the Hudson's Bay Company. It served as the centre of the fur trade within the Red River Colony.

Throughout the mid-to-late 19th century, Upper Fort Garry played a minor role in the actual trading of furs but was central to the administration of the HBC and the surrounding settlement. The Council of Assiniboia, the administrative and judicial body of the Red River Colony mainly run by Hudson's Bay Company officials, met at Upper Fort Garry.

In 1869, the Hudson's Bay Company agreed to surrender its monopoly in the North-West, including Upper Fort Garry. In late 1869 and early 1870, the fort was seized by Louis Riel and his Métis followers during the Red River Resistance.

== Provincial park ==
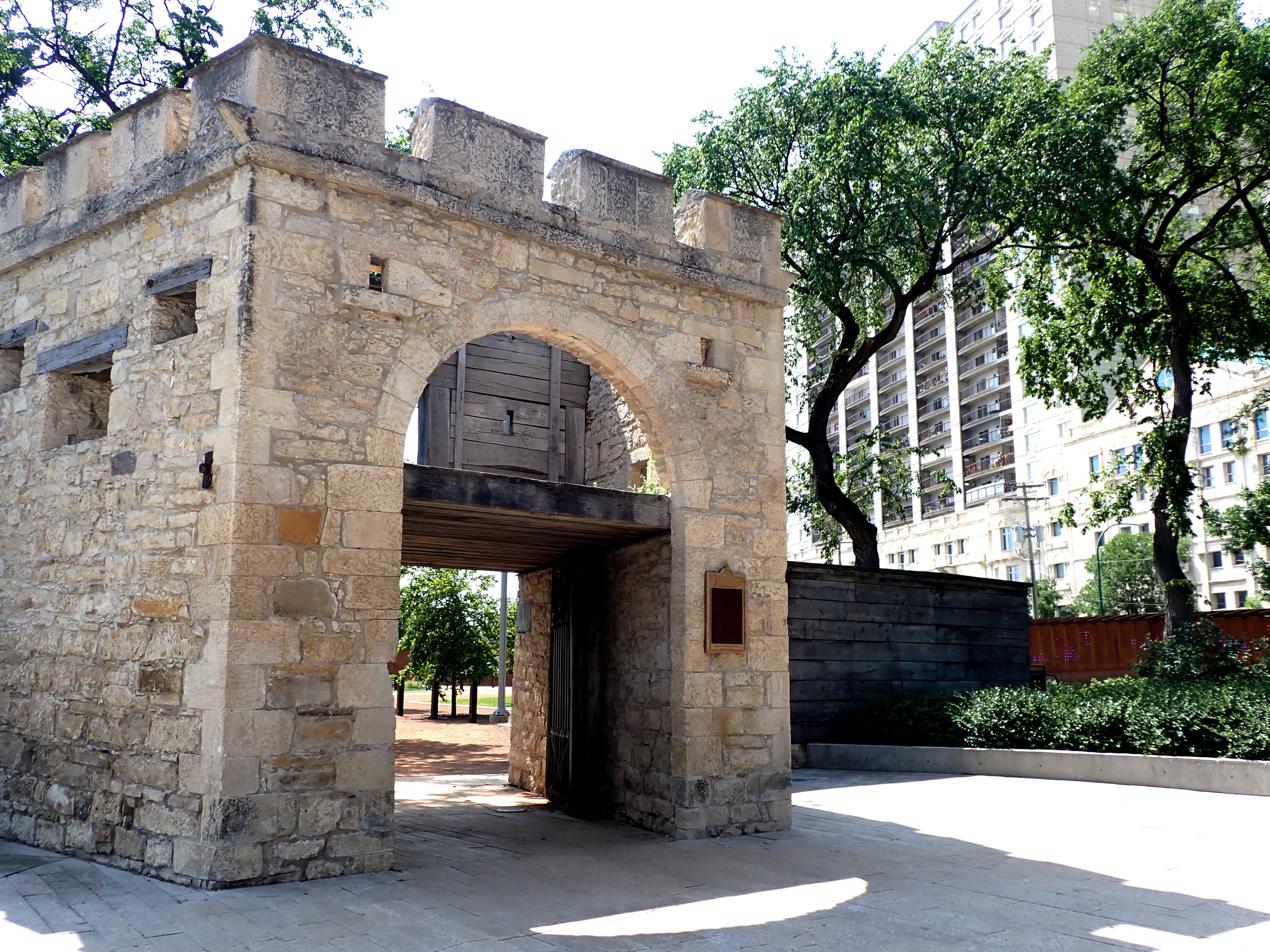
The stone Governor's Gate, the only surviving above-ground structure from Upper Fort Garry, now serves as the entrance to the provincial park.

Efforts to preserve the site of Upper Fort Garry as a public heritage space began in the early 2000s, more than a century after most of the fort was demolished in the 1880s. In 2007, a proposal by Crystal Developers to build a residential tower beside the fort's original footprint prompted the creation of the Friends of Upper Fort Garry, a community organization dedicated to preserving the site and developing an interpretive heritage park. Between 2007 and 2010, the organization raised funds and acquired several properties within the proposed park, including a former Petro-Canada service station, allowing the project to move forward.

Plans for the park were unveiled in May 2010. The following month, on 17 June 2010, the Legislative Assembly of Manitoba passed The Upper Fort Garry Heritage Provincial Park Act, establishing Manitoba's first urban heritage provincial park. The legislation protected the historic site while creating a public park where visitors could learn about the history of Upper Fort Garry, the fur trade, the Red River Settlement, and the Red River Resistance. The park occupies an entire downtown city block bounded by Main Street, Assiniboine Avenue, Fort Street, and the surviving Governor's Gate, although the neighbouring Manitoba Club property was excluded.

Designed by HTFC Planning & Design for the Friends of Upper Fort Garry, the park was conceived as an interpretive landscape rather than a reconstruction of the nineteenth-century fort. Instead of rebuilding lost structures, its design follows the original footprint of Upper Fort Garry through gardens, pathways, stone plinths marking the locations of former buildings, and open public spaces.

A central feature of the park is the Heritage Wall, a weathering steel installation approximately 122 metres (400 ft) long that follows the line of the fort's former western wall. Integrated graphics, lighting, sound, and multimedia presentations interpret more than 300 years of regional history, from the site's long Indigenous history and the fur trade to the Red River Settlement and the creation of Manitoba. Interpretive panels, digital media, and mobile technology are incorporated throughout the park, while the surviving Governor's Gate remains the only original above-ground structure from Upper Fort Garry.

The park opened to the public on 6 August 2015, five years after plans for the project were unveiled, although elements of the original master plan, including a dedicated interpretive centre, remain unbuilt.

== Archaeology ==
Archaeological investigations at Upper Fort Garry have taken place periodically since the late twentieth century, with the most extensive work beginning in the 2000s as plans were developed to preserve the site as Upper Fort Garry Heritage Provincial Park. Excavations across the original fort site have helped identify the locations of former buildings, sections of the fort's western wall and bastion, and other buried features that survived beneath downtown Winnipeg despite the fort's demolition in the 1880s.

Beginning in 2007, archaeological field schools held over several excavation seasons involved students from the University of Manitoba and the University of Winnipeg. Excavations identified the fort's stone-lined well, which had been dug in 1851 after an earlier well collapsed. Approximately 13 metres (43 ft) deep, the well supplied fresh water to the fort. Archaeologists also documented building foundations and other structural remains that informed archaeological interpretations of the site and the design of Upper Fort Garry Heritage Provincial Park.

Earlier excavations around the surviving Governor's Gate examined the original roadway through the gate, portions of the north palisade, and evidence of both the original fort and its later nineteenth-century expansion. Archaeologists recovered structural materials, domestic objects, and trade-related artifacts, including fragments of glass bottles and food jars, clay tobacco pipes, hand-forged and machine-cut nails, limestone building debris, timber remains, and sections of the wooden palisade.

== Recognition ==
Upper Fort Garry was designated, together with the sites of nearby Fort Rouge and Fort Gibraltar, as the Forts Rouge, Garry and Gibraltar National Historic Site of Canada on 4 June 1924. The designation recognizes the three forts as illustrating successive phases in the development of the fur trade in Western Canada: the expansion of the French trade at Fort Rouge, the rise of the North West Company at Fort Gibraltar, and the later dominance of the Hudson's Bay Company at Upper Fort Garry. The Governor's Gate, the only surviving above-ground structure from Upper Fort Garry, is the sole visible remnant included in the three-fort designation.

Upper Fort Garry was further commemorated in 1925, one year after the national designation, when a plaque was unveiled at the Governor's Gate.

On 15 June 1938, 14 years after the national designation, Upper Fort Garry was depicted on a 20-cent Canadian postage stamp showing the Governor's Gate.

The surviving Governor's Gate at Upper Fort Garry received separate recognition on 13 June 1991, when the City of Winnipeg designated it a municipal heritage structure. The gate was entered on the Canadian Register of Historic Places on 8 March 2007.

== Legacy ==
Although only the fort's main gate remains today, the name "Fort Garry" lives on through various institutions and businesses. An area or division of Winnipeg running along the Red River south of the original fort is called Fort Garry. The hotel beside the fort is called the Fort Garry Hotel, which was originally constructed for the Grand Trunk Pacific Railway company. Fort Street and Garry Street are on either side of the hotel. Many companies, such as Fort Garry Industries and the Fort Garry Brewing Company, have adopted the name. The Fort Garry Horse has been a component of the Winnipeg military garrison throughout the 20th and into the 21st centuries.

== See also ==
- Coat of arms of Winnipeg
- Council of Keewatin
- Fort Rouge (fortification)
- History of Winnipeg
- Temporary North-West Council
- Spokane Garry (was taught here)
