= Winnipeg Fire Paramedic Service =

- Address: 185 King Street, Winnipeg, MB (headquarters)

Agency overview
- Established: 1882 (Winnipeg Fire Department); 1974 (Winnipeg Ambulance Department)
- Annual calls: 3070 fire calls (2011
- Employees: 860 fire personnel (firefighters); 220 Emergency medical services personnel (paramedics)
- Staffing: 166 firefighters on duty
- Fire chief: Christian Schmidt
- Motto: We Hold Thee Safe

Facilities and equipment
- Stations: 34
- Engines: 29
- Trucks: 5
- Squads: 3
- Rescues: 6
- Ambulances: 17
- Tenders: 2

Website
- https://winnipeg.ca/fps/

Winnipeg Fire Paramedic Service (WFPS) provides fire and EMS services to the City of Winnipeg, Manitoba. It operates from 27 fire stations, and 3 administration offices across the city.

WFPS has two equally important divisions: the Winnipeg Fire Department (WFD) and Winnipeg Emergency Medical Services (WEMS), using a centralized dispatch system.

== History ==
The first Fire Commissioner of Manitoba was appointed via the Fires Prevention Act, which was assented to on 21 February 1872. At the time, the Act only addressed the prevention of prairie fires.

Winnipeg incorporated as a city on 8 November 1873. The following year, on September 24, the city's volunteer fire brigade was established. Rather than working-class citizens, this brigade was organized by local property owners to protect their properties from fire, as costs of insurance were drastically increasing.

On 14 October 1874, City Council proposed its first money referendum to eligible voters, which included an order to obtain a $25,000 line of credit towards purchasing fire engines and apparatus, as well as to construct buried underground water tanks along Main Street for firefighting purposes. (The only people who were entitled to vote at this time were the property owners, many of whom were also responsible for organizing the fire brigade.) The ordered equipment, which arrived the next month, included: hose reels, fire hose, a hook-and-ladder truck, and chemical engines, as well as a horse-drawn steam pumper.

On 25 January 1875, a city by-law was passed for the organization and management of a fire department. In 1976, each district of Manitoba had an Assistant Fire Commissioner appointed to provide training, investigation, inspections, public education, and other services. Also this year, the Manitoba Fire College was created.

The Winnipeg Fire Department was eventually created on 17 May 1882, with William O. McRobie as its first full-time Chief. At this time, there were 3 permanent stations of the WFD: Central, on 347 William Avenue; South, on 150 Smith Street; and North, on 47 Maple Street. In 1919, the WFD would adopt a two-platoon system, no longer requiring firefighters to live on job, 84 hours (3.5 days) a week. In 1928, the Fire Prevention Bureau was established and staffed with 3 members.

On 1 October 1946, the WFD implemented a three-platoon system, giving firefighters a 46-hour workweek. On 8 June 1954, Winnipeg experienced its largest fire in history, at the Time Building.

On 20 June 1959, Winnipeg would be the first in North America to receive a three-digit emergency number for police, fire, and ambulance—Dial 999 (eventually changed to 911). The next year, on the first of March, the WFD adopted a four-platoon system, granting firefighters a 42-hour workweek (two 10-hour days, two 14-hour night shifts in 8-week cycle).

In 1972, Winnipeg amalgamated with the several municipalities in the surrounding area. Finally, on 7 January 1974, the 8 municipal fire departments, including that of Winnipeg's, were combined to create a single department. Prior to amalgamation, fire department history in the former municipalities of the Greater Winnipeg area include:

- In 1919, West Kildonan received a full-time fire department.
- In 1920, East Kildonan received a 100-gallon horse-drawn chemical wagon, as well as its first fire station, located at Munroe and Watt.
- In 1922, St. Boniface received a separate department, staffed with 31 men.
- In 1955, North Kildonan received a volunteer fire department.
- In 1969, both St. Boniface fire halls were closed and replaced. North Kildonan established a full-time fire department, with 2 fire engines, 1 rescue, and a 1000-gallon tanker truck.

Also in 1974 came the Winnipeg Ambulance Department; before then, ambulance services were provided by local private ambulance companies. In 1982/1983, the WFD introduced the use of first responders to start assisting the Winnipeg Ambulance service on medical calls. As of 2000, both departments amalgamated to form the Emergency Response Service of Winnipeg, which was later renamed as the Winnipeg Fire Paramedic Service.

In northwest Winnipeg today, there sits a Winnipeg Fire Fighters Memorial Monument at Brookside Cemetery, commemorating local firefighters.

== Organization ==
The WFPS is guided by The Fires Prevention and Emergency Response Act of Manitoba.

=== Senior staff ===
As of February 2021:

- Fire & Paramedic Chief — Christian Schmidt
- Deputy Chief, Fire Operations - Scott Wilkinson
- Deputy Chief, Paramedic Operations — Ryan Sneath
- Deputy Chief, Safety, Emergency Management & Public Information - Jay Shaw
- Deputy Chief, Support Services & Communications — Tom Wallace
- Assistant Chief, Fire/Rescue Operations — Jamie Vanderhorst
- Assistant Chief, Paramedic Operations — Wayne Mosienko
- Assistant Chief, Community Risk Reduction — Lisa Gilmore
- Assistant Chief, Service Quality — Andre Berard
- Medical Director — Dr. Rob Grierson

=== Stations and offices ===
Stations and location, as of 2026
Station No.	Address	Services
1	65 Ellen Street	Ambulance, Fire suppression
2	55 Watt Street	Ambulance, Fire suppression
3	337 Des Meurons Street	Fire suppression
4	150 Osborne Street	Fire suppression
5	845 Sargent Avenue	Ambulance, Fire suppression
6	603 Redwood Avenue	Ambulance, Fire suppression
7	10 Allan Blye Drive	Fire suppression
8	640 Kimberley Avenue	Fire suppression
9	1083 Autumnwood Drive	Ambulance, Fire suppression
10	1354 Border Street	Ambulance, Fire suppression
11	1705 Portage Avenue	Ambulance, Fire suppression
12	1780 Taylor Avenue	Ambulance, Fire suppression
13	799 Lilac Street	Ambulance, Fire suppression
14	1057 St. Mary's Road	Ambulance, Fire suppression
15	130 Eaglewood Drive	Ambulance, Fire suppression
16	1001 McGregor Street	Ambulance, Fire suppression
17	1501 Church Avenue	Ambulance, Fire suppression
18	5000 Roblin Boulevard	Ambulance, Fire suppression
19	320 Whytewold Road	Fire suppression
20	525 Banting Drive	Ambulance, Fire suppression
21	1446 Regent Avenue W.	Ambulance, Fire suppression
22	1567 Waverley Street	Ambulance, Fire suppression
23	880 Dalhousie Drive	Fire suppression
24	1665 Rothesay Street	Ambulance, Fire suppression
25	701 Day Street	Ambulance, Fire suppression
26	1525 Dakota Street	Fire suppression
27	27 Sage Creek Boulevard	Ambulance, Fire suppression
30	524 Osborne Street	Ambulance
31	726 Furby Street	Ambulance
36	2490 Portage Avenue	Ambulance

Administrative offices and location
Office	Address
Headquarters & Fire Prevention	2nd Floor, 185 King Street
Training Academy	2546 McPhillips Street
Office of the Fire Commissioner	508-401 York Avenue

== Winnipeg Emergency Medical Services (WEMS) ==
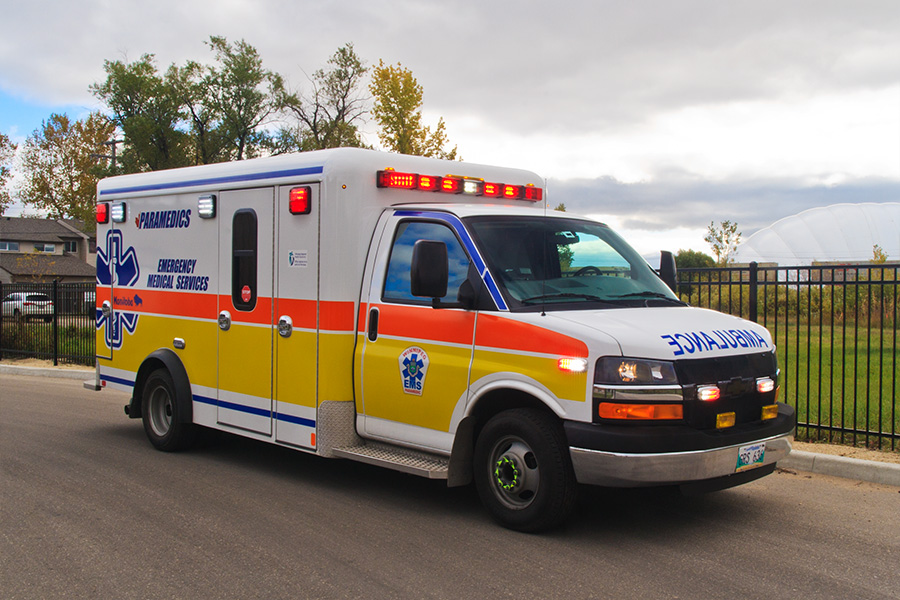
WEMS ambulance

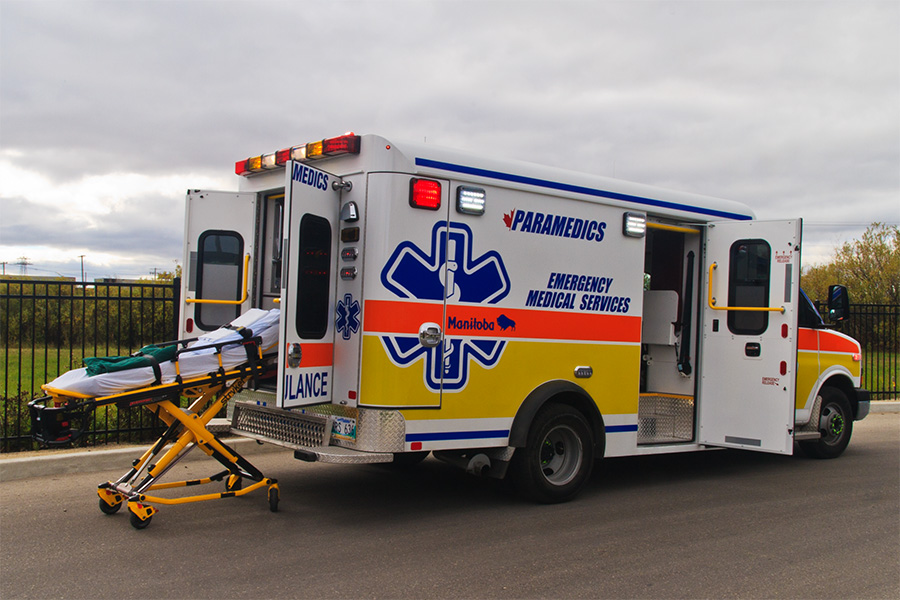
WEMS ambulance with ambulance cot

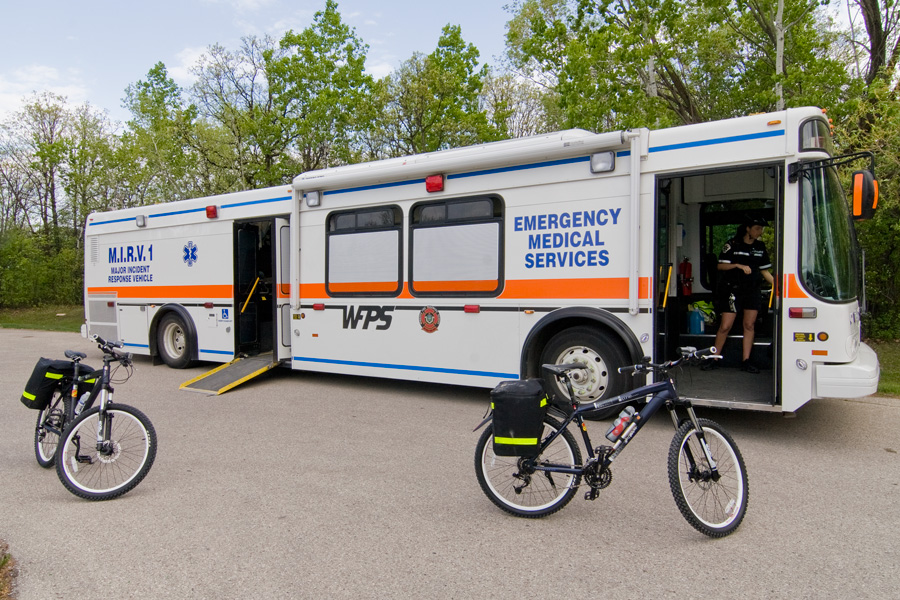
WEMS MIRV and PACER bicycles

The Winnipeg Emergency Medical Services (WEMS) is the branch of the Winnipeg Fire Paramedic Service that provides paramedic and ambulance emergency patient transport to the citizens of Winnipeg. WEMS operate out of 3 stand-alone ambulance stations and 20 of the 27 fire stations.

The service uses a dual-response system in which the Winnipeg Fire Department has a licensed Primary Care Paramedic on most firefighting apparatus who can assist the paramedics on ambulance.

WEMS has 25 ambulances, 1 Major Incident Response Vehicle (MIRV), 1 bariatric ambulance, 4 District Chiefs-Paramedic Operations, and 1 Platoon Chief- Paramedic Operations. Since 2002, WEMS operates 1 PACER Unit (Paramedics Active in Community Education and Response), which is a pair of specially outfitted paramedics deployed on bicycles during the summer months (weather and staffing permitting). District Chiefs-Paramedic Operations use chase vehicles to assist paramedics on ambulances with pediatric and high-acuity calls and review paramedics' performance for continuous quality improvement. The Platoon Chief-Paramedic Operations oversees all EMS operations and, if required, can respond in an Incident Command role.

WEMS paramedics are trained in Advanced Life Support (ALS), Advanced Trauma Life Support (ATLS), Advanced Cardiac Life Support (ACLS), Prehospital Trauma Life Support (PHTLS), Pediatric Advanced Life Support (PALS), and all meet the National Occupational Competency Profile (NOCP) established by the Paramedic Association of Canada (PAC). WEMS paramedics include: Primary Care Paramedics (PCP); Intermediate Care Paramedics (ICP); and Advance Care Paramedics (ACP). The ICP are unique to WEMS as a training level during the department's in-house, nationally-accredited Advance Care Paramedic Program.

As of 2014, WEMS operates on 6 platoons:

- four 24-hour platoons — each platoon operates 17 full-time ambulances, 2 interfacility patient transfer ambulances, 4 spare ambulances (dependent on staffing levels), 4 District Chief-Paramedic Operations, 1 Platoon Chief-Paramedic Operations, 1 MIRV, 1 bariatric ambulance, and 1 PACER Unit (Paramedics Active in Community Education and Response)
- two 12-hour "peak" platoons — These platoons assist during peak hours with greater call volumes. Each of these platoons operate 8 ambulances, 1 interfacility patient transfer ambulance, and 1 District Medical Supervisor unit.

Pre-hospital emergency medical services and emergency ambulance transport, like all other health care in Canada, is the responsibility of the provincial government. The City of Winnipeg operates the WEMS as a service purchase agreement to provide these services for the Winnipeg Regional Health Authority (WRHA) and Shared Health. WEMS is also responsible for providing interfacility patient transport for patients requiring specialty services not offered at the hospital at which they are being treated and repatriate patients to community hospitals. They are assisted by the WRHA Transport Team: Respiratory Therapists with specialized training for transporting ventilated patients or those receiving certain medication infusions. All stable patients not requiring interventions, advanced skills or being repatriated to a Personal Care Home are not transported by WEMS but by Stretcher Service of Manitoba who operate under contract. WEMS also transports patients coming to the city via air ambulance to hospital.

=== WEMS Community Paramedics ===
WEMS currently operates 2 award-winning community paramedicine programs: the Main Street Project Paramedic and the Emergency Paramedic In the Community (EPIC).

The Main Street Project is a crisis/drop-in shelter service that offers a drop-in shelter, a chemical detoxification unit, transitional housing, and houses the city's Intoxicated Person's Detention Area (IPDA). Since 2009, the Main Street Project Paramedics are responsible for on-site assessment and monitoring of all IPDA clients, as well as providing a first line access to care for the clients of the drop-in shelter, the detoxification unit and those in the transitional housing unit. The community paramedics at The Main Street Project are on site 24 hours every day. Since October 2013, Main Street Project Paramedics have been offering HIV point-of-care testing (POCT) to clients of The Main Street Project and high-risk individuals in the community. Since HIV POCT have been offered at The Main Street Project, this site does more POCT than the all other sites in Manitoba offering the test combined.

As of 2013 WEMS, added the Emergency Paramedic In the Community (EPIC) program. The EPIC paramedics provide non-transport medical assistance to common 911 callers, the Salvation Army building and other at-risk patients in the community. The EPIC community paramedics run 12 hours per day, every day during daytime and evening hours. In December 2013, the EPIC program was expanded to follow up with at risk individuals in the community after 9-1-1 calls. When WFPS Paramedics respond to 9-1-1 calls and identify citizens who are at risk, they have the ability to fill out a referral to the EPIC program. The EPIC Paramedics follow up on each referral and help the citizens gain access to proper medical care or other needed resources. Once the needs of the patients are met, the EPIC program tracks these patients to ensure the resources put in place continue to be effective.

== Winnipeg Fire Department ==
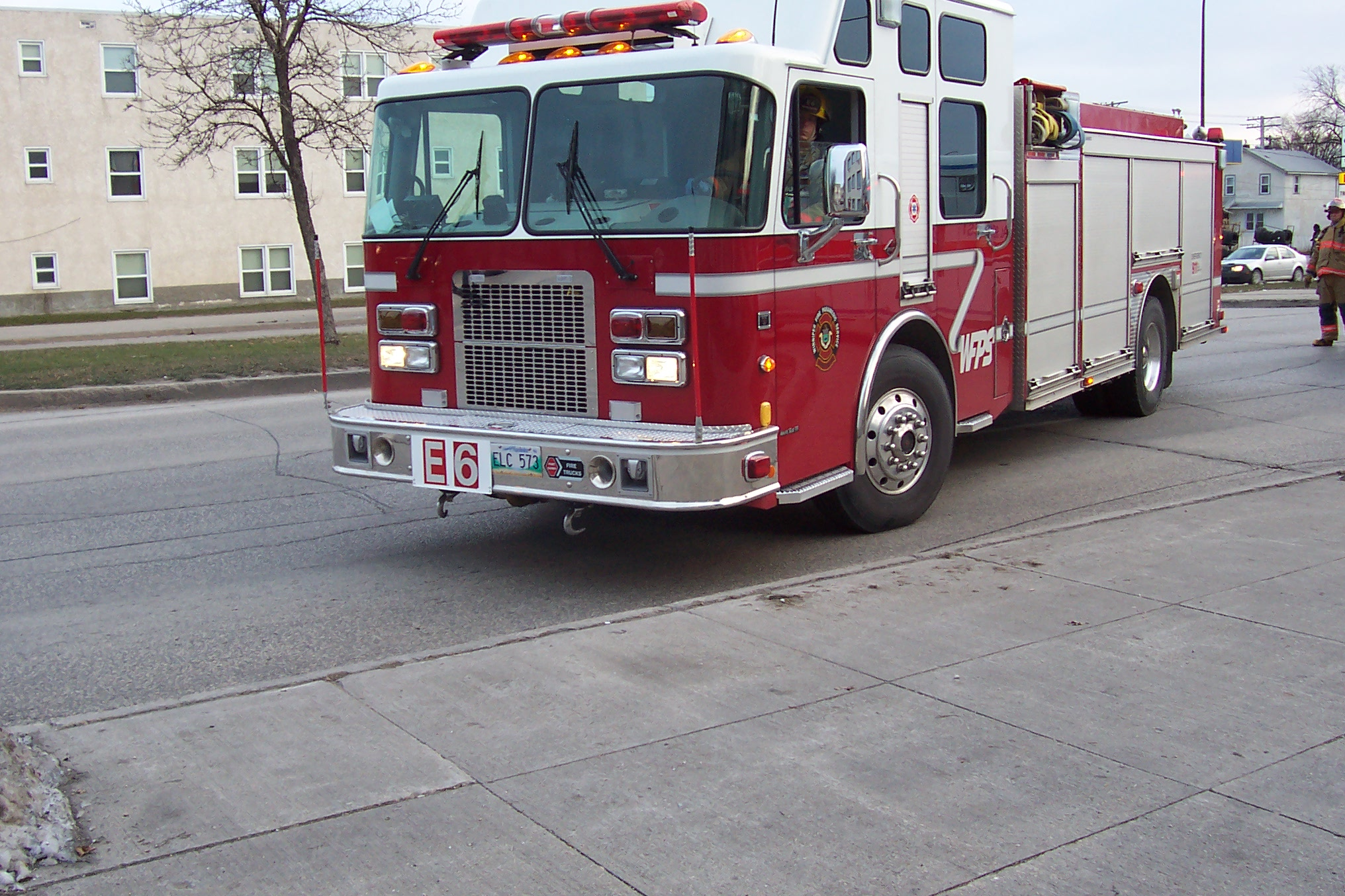
WFD Engine6 fire truck

The Winnipeg Fire Department (WFD), operating under the parent organization of the Winnipeg Fire Paramedic Service, is the fire department for the City of Winnipeg.

It provides fire suppression service, HAZMAT (Hazardous Materials) responses, high-angle rescue, trench rescue, vehicle extrication, and surface water rescue, as well as assisting the Winnipeg Emergency Medical Services branch with pre-hospital patient care.

Initially, Winnipeg had a volunteer fire brigade that began in the city in 1874; the WFD was subsequently created in 1882.

As of 2026, 28 fire engine pumper companies, 7 rescue companies (5 utilising engine pumpers, 2 utilising heavy rescue apparatus), 6 aerial ladders (3 100-foot platforms, 2 100-foot ladders, 1 75-foot ladder quint), 3 squads, 4 District Chief units, 2 Fire Investigators, 1 Safety Officer, and 1 Platoon Chief operate on four 48-hour platoons (two 10-hour shifts, two 14-hour shifts, and then 4 days off); all units are operational and staffed full-time. WFD also has 2 of the heavy rescue units that assist with technical rescue, trench rescue, hazmat, vehicle extrication, water rescue, along with specialty design vehicles, as well as 2 jetboats and several zodiacs for water rescue & water-based fire suppression.

Until 1 January 2018, the WFD also offered child car seat inspections to the general public. These inspections required the owner of the child seat to have already installed the seat in the vehicle and to bring it to one of the seven stations at which the service is offered. There, firefighters that had special training in ensuring child car seats are fitted safely would inspect the car seat to make sure it is safe for use. If any adjustments were required, they would assist the owner in making the adjustments and educate them on how to properly secure the child seat.

== WFPS Communication Centre ==
The WFPS Communication Centre is responsible for receiving emergency calls and dispatching of all ambulance and fire apparatus for the City of Winnipeg. The City of Winnipeg operates a centralized 9-1-1 emergency call service for both the Winnipeg Police Service and WFPS. All calls are received by the Winnipeg Police Communication Division who passes on all non-police calls over to the WFPS Communication Centre. The WFPS Communication Operators are responsible for triaging all EMS and Fire calls received at the centre and dispatching all emergency, non-emergency and pre-booked Interfacility Transfer calls. Since 2007, WFPS has been using a central dispatch for both EMS and Fire calls.

All pre-booked emergency and non-emergency Interfacility Transfers are handled by the Interfacility Transfer (IFT) division. The IFT dispatchers are responsible for triaging and assigning this workload to the WEMS Transfer division, the WRHA Transport Team and Stretcher Service of Manitoba.

The Communication Centre uses the AcuityPoint Computer Aided Dispatch (CAD) System developed by Lynx Graphics which integrates the enhanced 9-1-1 Sentinel telephone system (E911). This gives Communication Operators the advantage of receiving immediate information on the caller such as the caller's location and phone number. This information, along with all other information obtained by the operator is relayed to all EMS vehicles' Electronic Patient Care Reports (E-PCR). The Communication Centre relays all dispatch information electronically to Station computers, the crew's Panasonic Toughbook computers (E-PCR) in the field and over the air through a Harris P-25 trunked radio network.

To facilitate dispatching of the closest appropriate unit, EMS vehicles and Fire apparatus are equipped with and Automatic Vehicle Location (AVL) System. This along with electronic status heads in every vehicle reporting unit responding, on-scene and transporting times help the dispatchers keep accurate tracking of all units whereabouts, status and availability.

The Communication Centre is staffed by a minimum of 7 Operators and 1 Communication Center Shift Supervisor (CCSS) on four 24 hours platoons, dispatching WEMS and WFD. All Communication Operators are responsible to taking 9-1-1 calls, confirming the address and phone number of the emergency, obtaining all specific relevant information about the call, establishing through security questions if the scene is safe for field providers to attend and establishing the priority of the call (emergency or non-emergency). The 9-1-1 call taker then forwards the information to the EMS or Fire dispatchers (or both) who are responsible for assigning the call to the appropriate crews/units as well as monitor all vehicles in the field. Meanwhile, the call taker may stay on the line until help arrives on-scene and will give pre-arrival instructions to the patient. These include assisting/instructing the caller with performing Cardiopulmonary Resuscitation (CPR), or instructing appropriate chest pain patients to self-administer Aspirin (ASA). The WFPS also is responsible for the operations of the WRHA's Inter Facility Transport system. The booking and dispatching of ambulances and stretcher car services in the movement of patients between care facilities within the city's 6 hospitals and many clinics. This secondary dispatch center is staffed 24/7 with 3-4 communication operators who interchange with the 911 center on a rotational basis.

All Communication Operators are at minimum trained and licensed Emergency medical responders (EMR), and receive intensive in-house training. All Operators have obtained the National Academy of Emergency Dispatch System's Emergency Telecommunicator (ETC) Certification, Emergency Medical Dispatcher (EMD) Certification and Emergency Fire Dispatcher (EFD) Certification. They are also certified in use of the Medical Priority Dispatch System (MPDS) and Fire Priority Dispatch System (FPDS). Both of these dispatch systems are used internationally and guarantee consistent and accurate assessment of the caller's emergency as well as consistent dispatching. These system help alleviate problems where the caller may exaggerate or downplay the emergency, and provides the call taker with a consistent approach to every call. All Communication Operators go through ongoing training with these systems and go through yearly recertification. The Communication Centre Shift Supervisor is responsible for overseeing all operations within the Communication Centre and review calls for continuous quality improvement.

WFPS has a primary and secondary fully operational Communication Centre, both with generator back-up power so that all communication services they provide maintain 100% full-time, uninterrupted operation regardless of circumstances on incidents that may occur.
