= James Bird =

James Bird may refer to:

== Sports ==
- James Bird (rugby union) (born 1989), Welsh-born American rugby union player
- James Bird (cricketer) (1808–1876), English cricketer
- Doug Bird (James Douglas Bird, born 1950), baseball player

== Others ==
- James Curtis Bird (1773–1856), Canadian fur trader
- James Bird (poet) (1788–1839), English poet and dramatist
- James Bird (fur trader) (1798–1892), Canadian-American fur trader
- J. Malcolm Bird (James Malcolm Bird, 1886–1964), American mathematician and parapsychologist
- Jim Bird, Utah politician
- James Bird (Illinois politician) in 5th Illinois General Assembly

== See also ==
- James Byrd (disambiguation)
