= Birds Hill Provincial Park =

Provincial park in southern Manitoba

- IUCN category III (natural monument or feature)
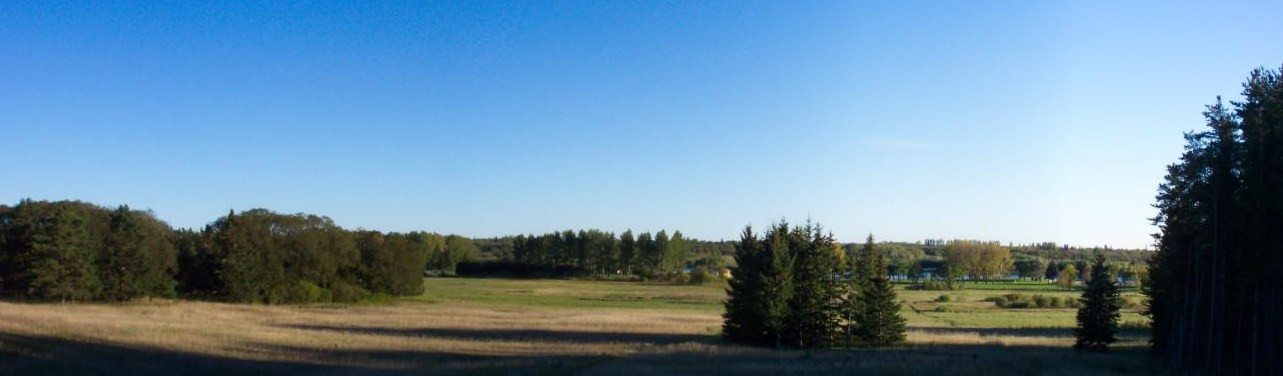
- Birds Hill Park, overlooking lake

- Location within Manitoba
- Location: Manitoba, Canada
- Nearest city: Winnipeg, Manitoba
- Coordinates: 50°01′28″N 96°53′01″W
- Area: 35.1 km^{2} (13.6 sq mi)
- Designation: Provincial Park
- Established: 1964
- Governing body: Government of Manitoba
- Administrator: Province of Manitoba

Birds Hill Provincial Park

Birds Hill Provincial Park is a provincial park in Manitoba, Canada located in the Boreal Plains ecozone. The park protects areas representative of Aspen/Oak parkland, as well as provides opportunities for recreation. It is located 24 kilometers north of Winnipeg on Highway 59, and covers approximately 8,300 acres (3,400 hectares) or 35.1 km^{2} (13.6 square miles).

Birds Hill Provincial Park was designated a provincial park by the Government of Manitoba in 1964. The park is considered to be a Category III protected area under the IUCN protected area management categories.

== Description ==
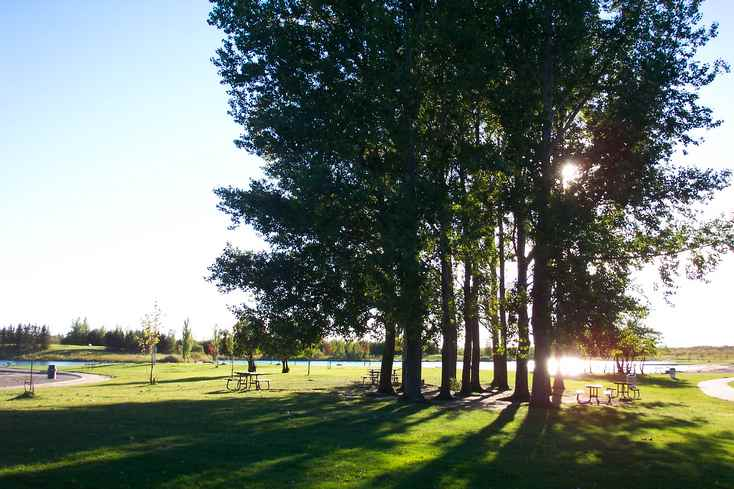
Picnic area beside lake at Birds Hill Provincial Park

Birds Hill Provincial Park is a popular destination, receiving more than a million visitors annually. In summer, festivals and sporting events are held, the main campground is heavily booked, and families enjoy the beach and picnic areas. In winter, trails are groomed for cross-country skiing, skijoring and kick-sledding and the riding stable offers horse-drawn sleigh rides.

More than half of the park is set aside as backcountry, offering visitors trails for hiking, cross-country skiing, horseback riding and mountain biking. Almost 40% of the park is classified for recreational development use, including the campgrounds, the beach and picnic sites, the scenic roadways, the riding stable and other equestrian facilities, the festival site and the pioneer homesteads.

Three scenic roadways were added when the park was developed, North Drive, South Drive and Festival Drive. The paved shoulders of these roads are frequently used for walking, running, roller sports, and cycling.

Birds Hill Provincial Park is located within the Rural Municipalities of Springfield and St. Clements; the official boundary between the two municipalities runs through the park.

== Geology ==
The park rises in a series of six low rounded hills. Those in the south and west stand 20 m (66 ft) above the surrounding land while those in the north and east are more than 40 metres (130 ft) higher. A lookout tower has been built on Griffiths Hill at about the halfway point of the Chickadee hiking trail.

The park's landscape today is still defined by the events of 11,000 to 12,000 years ago as a Pleistocene glacier retreated and melted into glacial Lake Agassiz. Initially the glacier melt water deposited sand and gravel in a complex of eskers. As the glacier continued to retreat, Lake Agassiz submerged the eskers adding silt and clay around them. At the edge of the huge lake, spits and beaches formed and eroded as the lake slowly dropped. Five major strandlines of this glacial lake can be found within the park boundaries.

The rock layers beneath Birds Hill Park are consistent with those in the surrounding region. Deepest of all are those of the Precambrian Superior Craton, the volcano-plutonic rocks of the Bird River subprovince. The older rocks are overlaid by Paleozoic layers—the dolomitic limestone and dolomite of the Red River Formation on top of the shale and sandstone of the Winnipeg Formation. These two sedimentary layers contain aquifers important to neighbouring communities, including Winnipeg. The glacial and post glacial deposits lying directly on the sedimentary layers within the park allow precipitation to recharge the aquifer beneath.

== Ecology ==
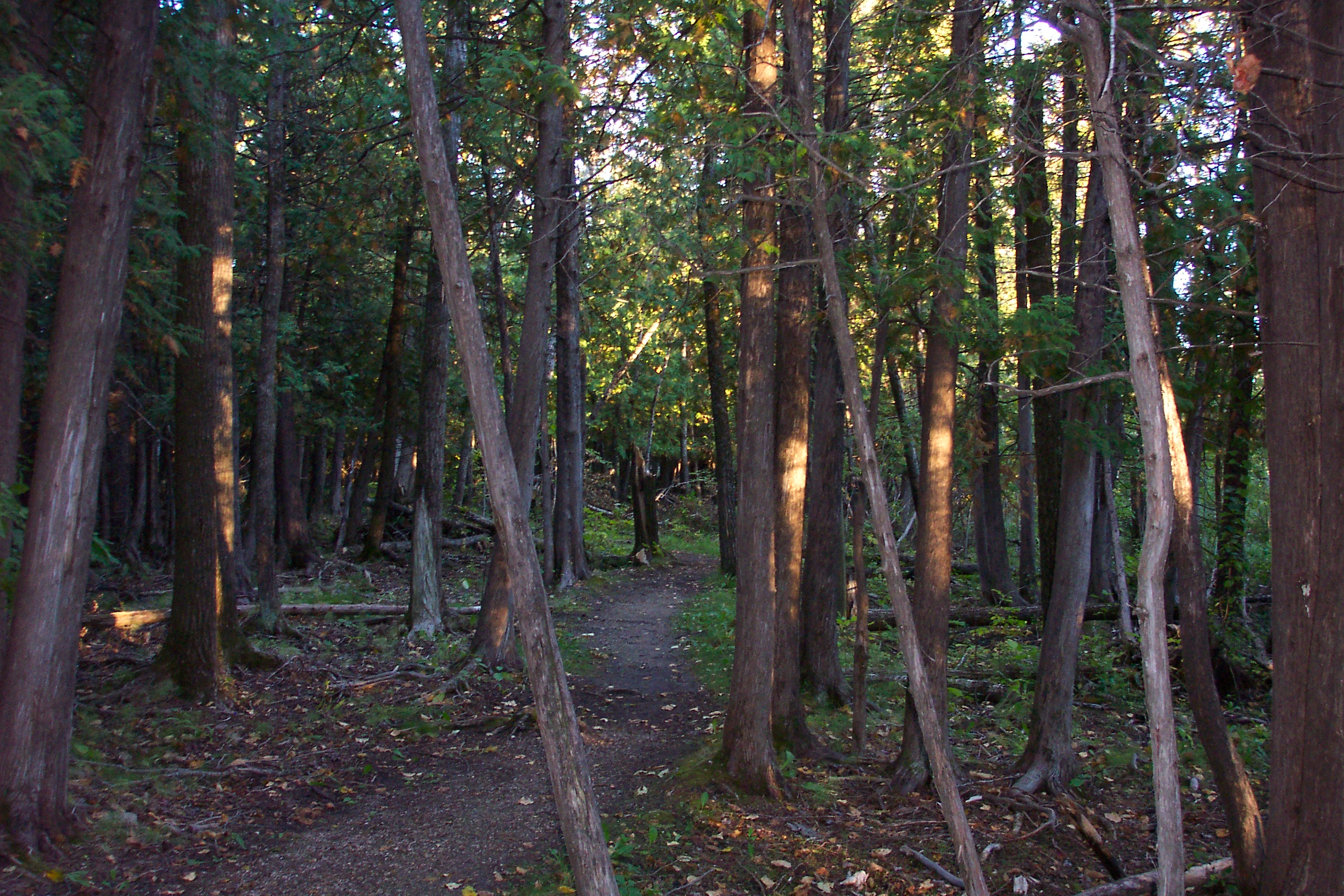
Cedar bog self-guiding trail winds through an aspen forest in the park to descend into a bog of eastern white cedar. Cedar Bogs are uncommon in Manitoba.

Trembling aspen and bur oak forest is the dominant plant community found in the park. Prairie species are found in drier upland sites. Wetlands in the park include marshes, black spruce/tamarack bogs and a cedar bog. Other trees found within the park include Manitoba maple, jack pine, paper birch, white spruce, and balsam poplar .

Birds Hill Park is home to over 40 mammal species including white-tailed deer.

Over two hundred species of birds have been found within the park boundaries. These include northern goshawk, northern shrike, boreal chickadee, red-breasted nuthatch, American woodcock, northern saw-whet owl, Sprague's pipit, indigo bunting, eastern towhee, and lark sparrow.

Western silvery aster, a species protected under federal and provincial Endangered Species laws, has been found growing in the park.

== History ==
Since the area is higher than the surrounding terrain, what is now Birds Hill Park served early settlers as a refuge from flooding in the years 1826 and 1852.

Between 1895 and 1899, the settlers of Pine Ridge built a Lutheran church on land then owned by John Uhrich, now within the park. The church closed in 1920 and its building was removed to another site, and later demolished. The church graveyard, Pine Ridge Cemetery, is located near Nimowin Road. Many early settlers of the area are buried there.

The park was formed from land expropriated from more than 150 local landowners in 1964. The official opening date was marked by a ribbon cutting ceremony by Manitoba premier Duff Roblin on July 15, 1967.

The park is named in honour of Dr. Curtis Bird, first speaker of the Manitoba provincial legislature in 1873, whose father had been a factor in the Hudson's Bay Company and received a large land grant at this location.

== Events ==
Equestrian and cycling events for the 1967 Pan American Games hosted by Winnipeg were held in the park.

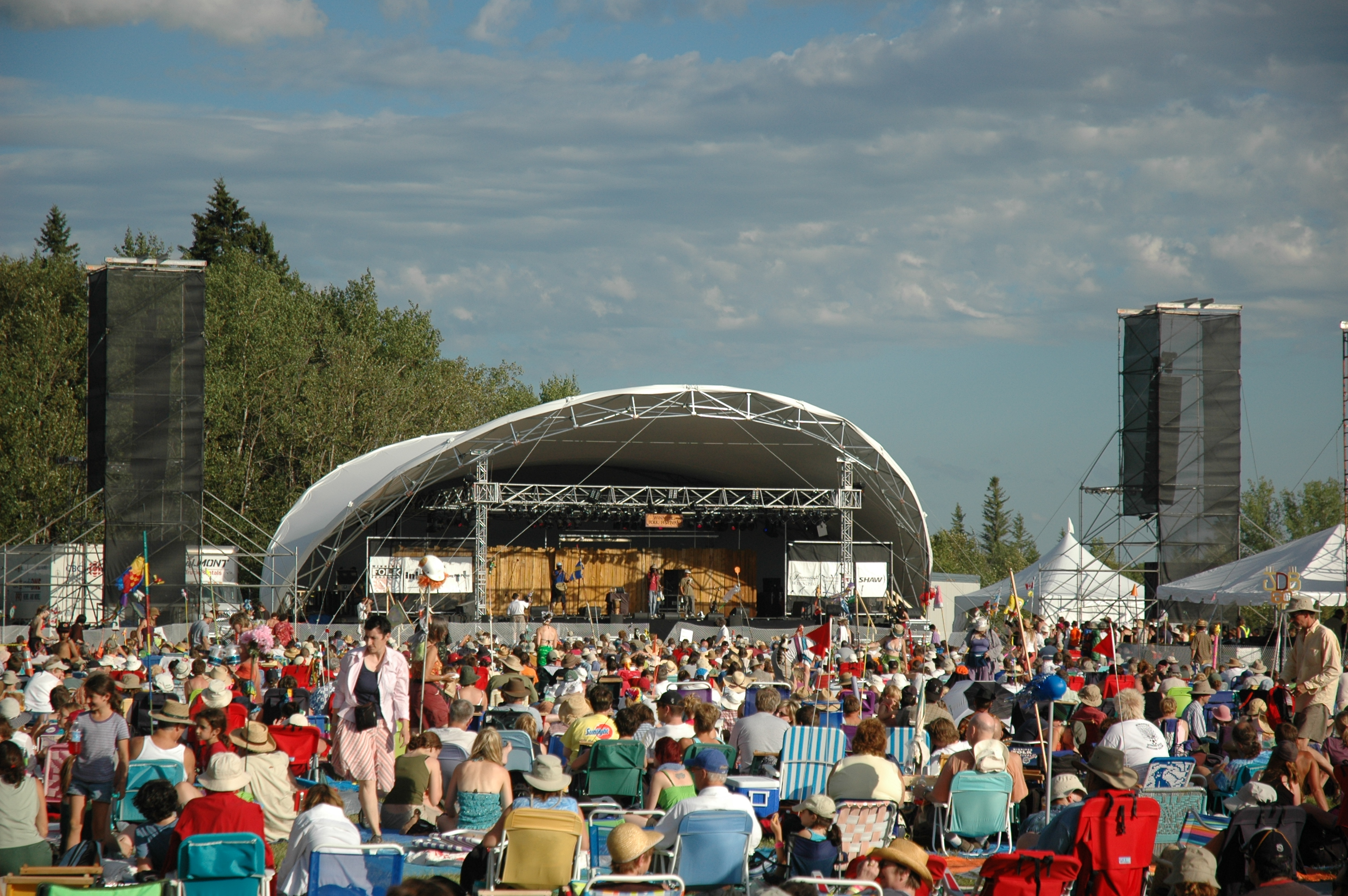
Winnipeg Folk Festival, Main Stage, 2006

Every July since 1974, the park has been the site of the Winnipeg Folk Festival.

September 16, 1984, Pope John Paul II celebrated mass at the park during his visit to Manitoba.

On August 29, 1992, Bryan Adams performed at the Waking Up the Nation Festival held at the park with the Deadbeat Honeymooners, Extreme, Sass Jordan and Steve Miller.

The park hosted the 1998 Canadian Triathlon Championships.

The park was the location of the road cycling, triathlon, and equestrian competitions during the 1999 Pan American Games.

In 2017, the park was the venue for the triathlon, road cycling and open-water swimming events for the Canada Games.

== See also ==
- Birds Hill, Manitoba
- List of protected areas of Manitoba
