= Birds Hill =

- Unincorporated municipality
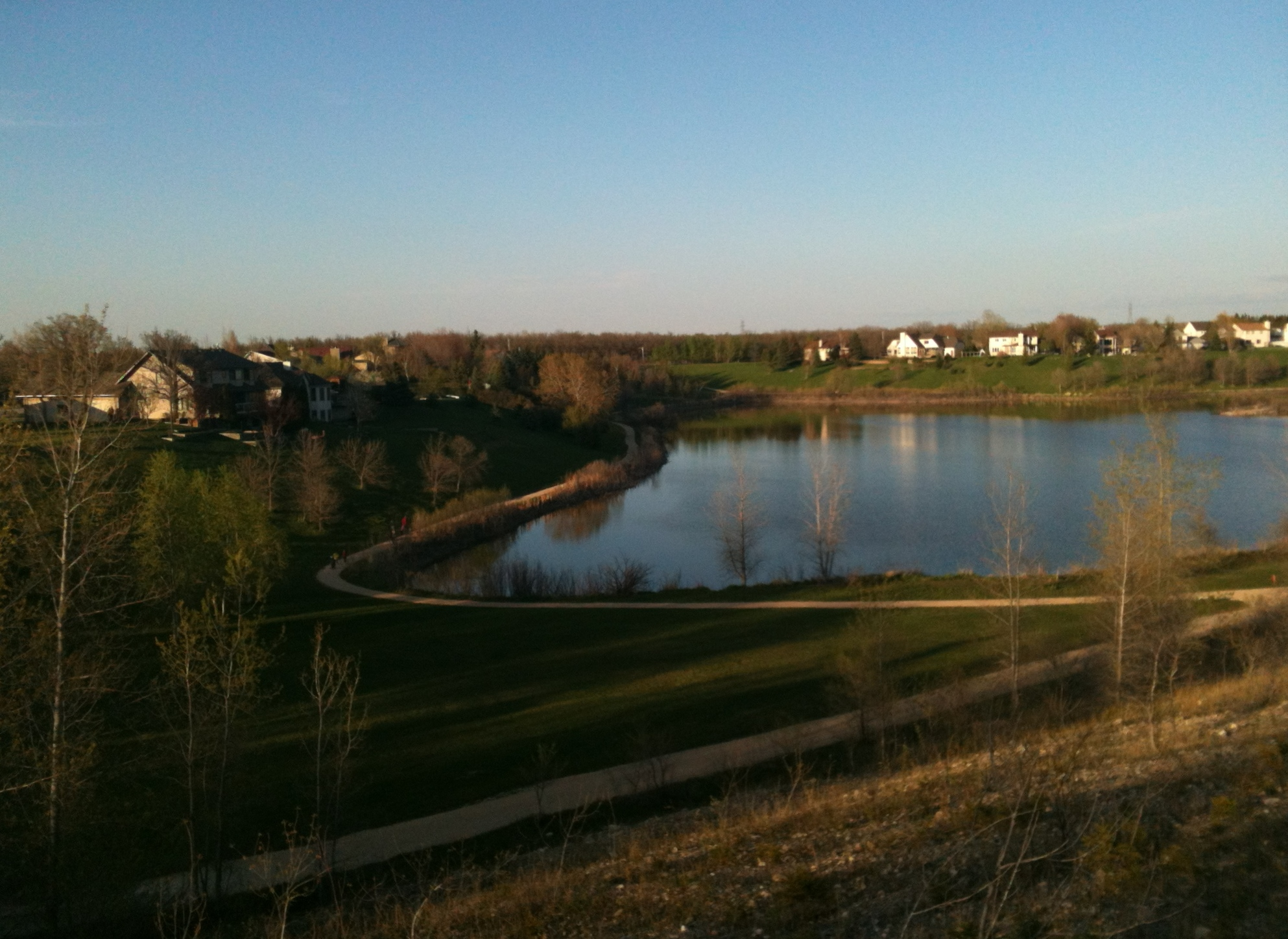
- Homes along Silverfox Estates in Birds Hill.

- Location within Manitoba
- Coordinates: 49°58′30″N 97°00′19″W
- Country: Canada
- Rural Municipality: East St. Paul
- Founder: James Curtis Bird

Birds Hill is an unincorporated community in the Canadian province of Manitoba located a few kilometers northeast of Winnipeg, Manitoba, in the Rural Municipality of East St. Paul. The community is a few kilometers east of the Red River The R.M. of East St. Paul's Administration and Finance Departments, Fire Department, municipal council chambers, and RCMP offices are located in Birds Hill. The community includes Silverfox Estates and the Country Villas, which is Manitoba's first resort age-restricted adult-only gated community. Built in 1998, this residential area is an exclusively low-density community where 163 detached, single-family homes are on private landscaped sites.

== Geography ==
A portion of the community is located on top of a hill formed during the last ice age by a glacial sand deposit, or esker. These sand ridges are some of the highest elevations in south-central Manitoba. The hills in the area were a place for settlers and native peoples to escape to when fleeing high floodwaters along the Red River valley. Birds Hill Park is located on the same ridge of sand eskers as Birds Hill but at the other end of them. A large property in the area was owned by James Curtis Bird after whom the area is named, was a fur trader, chief factor of the Lower Red River district in 1821 and one time governor of Assiniboia. His son, Curtis James Bird a Canadian doctor, politician, and Speaker of the Manitoba Legislative Assembly from 1873 to 1874 inherited the property from his father.

== History ==
The gravel business led to the rapid settlement of Birds Hill. Canadian Pacific Railway first dug the quarry at Birds Hill in the 1870s to provide ballast for the transcontinental railway. The City of Winnipeg purchased the quarry later and used the gravel for everything from building roads and house foundations to filling sandbags. Hundreds of people were employed in the quarry at one time. The pit was owned by numerous others before the Swiston family's company called Birds Hill Gravel and Stone last operated it. After the pits could no longer be used for mining gravel, the Swiston family undertook rehabilitation in 1983 with the sloping of the banks and the development of a walkway in preparation for the Silverfox housing subdivision that would overlook part of the area. The Swiston family was able to obtain small funding grants, but 90% of the funding came from Birds Hill gravel and Stone's profits. The dug out quarry has since been reclaimed as Silver Springs Park with homes along part of its perimeter.

In 1914, a two-storey brick school was constructed on Lot 95 on Birds Hill Road. The foundation stone was laid on 22 May 1914 by Deputy Minister of Education Robert Fletcher. The two-room facility was built by contractor Walter Owens that expanded with two additional classrooms approved by local voters in two months of the school's opening that cost a further $3,000. As of 1984, the school had three classrooms with four portable classrooms on-site, two of which were used as a gymnasium and library. The building was put up for sale and demolished in March 1987. The site is now a Sobeys. Built in 1985 and 1986 at the corner of Hoddinott Road and Raleigh Street, the Birds Hill Elementary School added capacity to the River East School Division, replacing the original Birds Hill School. It opened for the 1986-1987 school year. The old school’s name stone and cornerstone have been retained on the present school.

A monument in Memorial Park in Birds Hill was dedicated originally on 13 September 1925 by Rev. R. W. Ridgeway of St. Thomas’ Anglican Church and Rev. J. W. McAlpine of Bird’s Hill United Church commemorates residents killed during military service. It was unveiled before a crowd of around 100, including families of the fallen, along with East St. Paul Reeve W. J. Dawson and Councillors, Police Magistrate W. G. Scott, ex-Reeve A. E. Sperring, municipal Secretary-Treasurer W. Gorham and R. D. Waugh.

Silverfox Estates is named after a large silver fox fur ranch which from 1922 to 1970 raised silver foxes there as a source of fur.

== Recreation ==
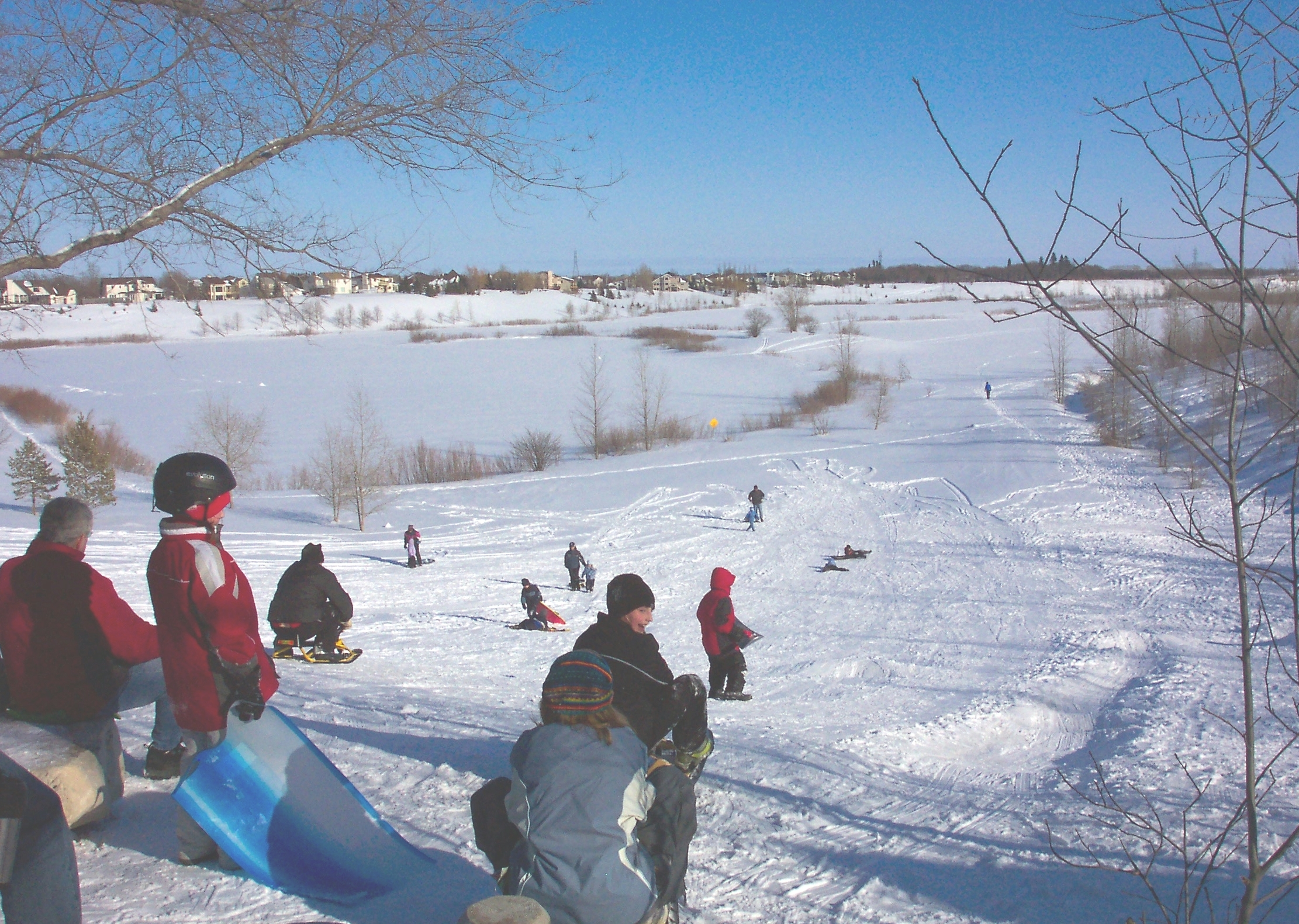
Families tobogganing at Birds Hill.

Silver Springs Park, renamed Swiston Family Heritage Park in 2020, is described as a hidden gem in East St. Paul, little known outside the municipality. A quarry was dug out of one of the largest hills in the area, and rehabilitated into a municipal park. The park is a vast space. The excavation site is about 73 hectares and the south bank is 21 meters deep. The Swistun family leveled the quarry bottom and sloped the sides so they wouldn't be a danger. They had topsoil hauled into the quarry and planted native grasses and more than 1,200 trees and shrubs. They also built a causeway to an island on the lake. Inland Aggregates assisted with the rehabilitation. It started to look like a park by the 1990s. There was never a grand opening. It just slowly evolved. The park is a staging area for both the Trans Canada Trail, which runs through it, and the floodway's non-motorized recreation trail, called the Duff Roblin Parkway Trail. People canoe and kayak on the quarry lake. The vegetation is an oak-aspen mix, including pin cherry and chokecherry bushes, and even horsetail, a plant species 100 million years old. There are plenty of birds, including geese, ducks, songbirds, swallows, and sandpipers. The south slope is a popular tobogganing site in winter. The municipality also clears an ice-skating trail.

== See also ==
- Birds Hill Provincial Park
- Winnipeg Folk Festival
