= Henry Septimus Beddome =

Henry Septimus Beddome (March 21, 1830 – March 24, 1881) was an English-Canadian medical doctor and a Hudson's Bay Company employee.

Henry was born in London, England, to Protestant nonconformist parents William Beddome and Eleanor Smith. He studied medicine at Guy's Hospital in London. He migrated to Canada and became "Surgeon and Clerk" at York Factory in Manitoba for five years starting in 1852. After this term, he traveled to the Red River Colony where he met and married Frances Omand. In 1859, the family returned to York Factory for another five-year contract.

Beddome and his family returned to Red River in 1864 where he established a practice and a permanent residence near St Andrew's Church. It is said that when Louis Riel went into hiding in 1870, Beddome may have concealed him for a time.

Henry Beddome and fellow doctors, including Curtis James Bird and John Christian Schultz were the founders of the Medical Health Board of Manitoba which was incorporated in 1871 and became the College of Physicians and Surgeons of Manitoba in 1877.

Beddome died at Headingley, Manitoba, and was buried at St Andrew's Church in Manitoba.
