= A-ca-oo-mah-ca-ye =

Name of three Siksiká chiefs

Aka-Omahkayii (also Ackomokki or A-ca-oo-mah-ca-ye (Blackfoot syllabics: ᖳᖿ ᖱᒍᑊᖿᔪ, meaning Old Swan), was the name of three Siksiká chiefs between the late 1700s and 1860.

== Aka-Omahkayii/Old Swan (I) ==
The first Aka-Omahkayii (d. January 1795) was described by Duncan M'Gillivray, the North West Company clerk at Fort George, as "once the greatest Cheif [sic] of this Nation and was respected and esteemed by all neighboring tribes." By the time Aka-Omahkayii was chief, the Blackfoot/Plains Confederacy had consolidated power throughout he plains of what is modern-day Montana, Alberta, and western Saskatchewan. He was known as a peacemaker who was open to trade with Europeans. Aka-Omahkayii realized that establishing a direct relationship with Euro-Canadian traders would benefit the Siksiká by bypassing Cree and Assiniboine middlemen. As he grew older, Aka-Omahkayii was forced to step aside as chief, but he remained a respected elder of the tribe until his death following a fall in 1795.

== Aka-Omahkayii/Old Swan (II)/Feathers ==
Aka-Omahkayii's son (d. October 1814) was known to fur traders as "Feathers" (or "Painted Feathers"). After his father's death he adopted the name Aka-Omahkayii, although Europeans continued to call him "Feathers" or "Many Swans" to distinguish him from his father. The elder Aka-Omahkayii's retirement led to a dispute over the tribe's leadership between the younger Aka-Omahkayii and Big Man/Gros Blanc (O-mok-a-pee), who struck a more hostile position toward white traders and other Native American tribes. Despite his early success as a warrior and hunter, younger Aka-Omahkayii adopted his father's policies and worked to preserve peace among his people and the neighboring Cree and Assiniboine peoples, as well as with European traders. By contrast, Big Man was openly hostile to other tribes and European traders, going so far as to participate in the 1793 Gros Ventre attack on the Hudson Bay Company's Manchester House.

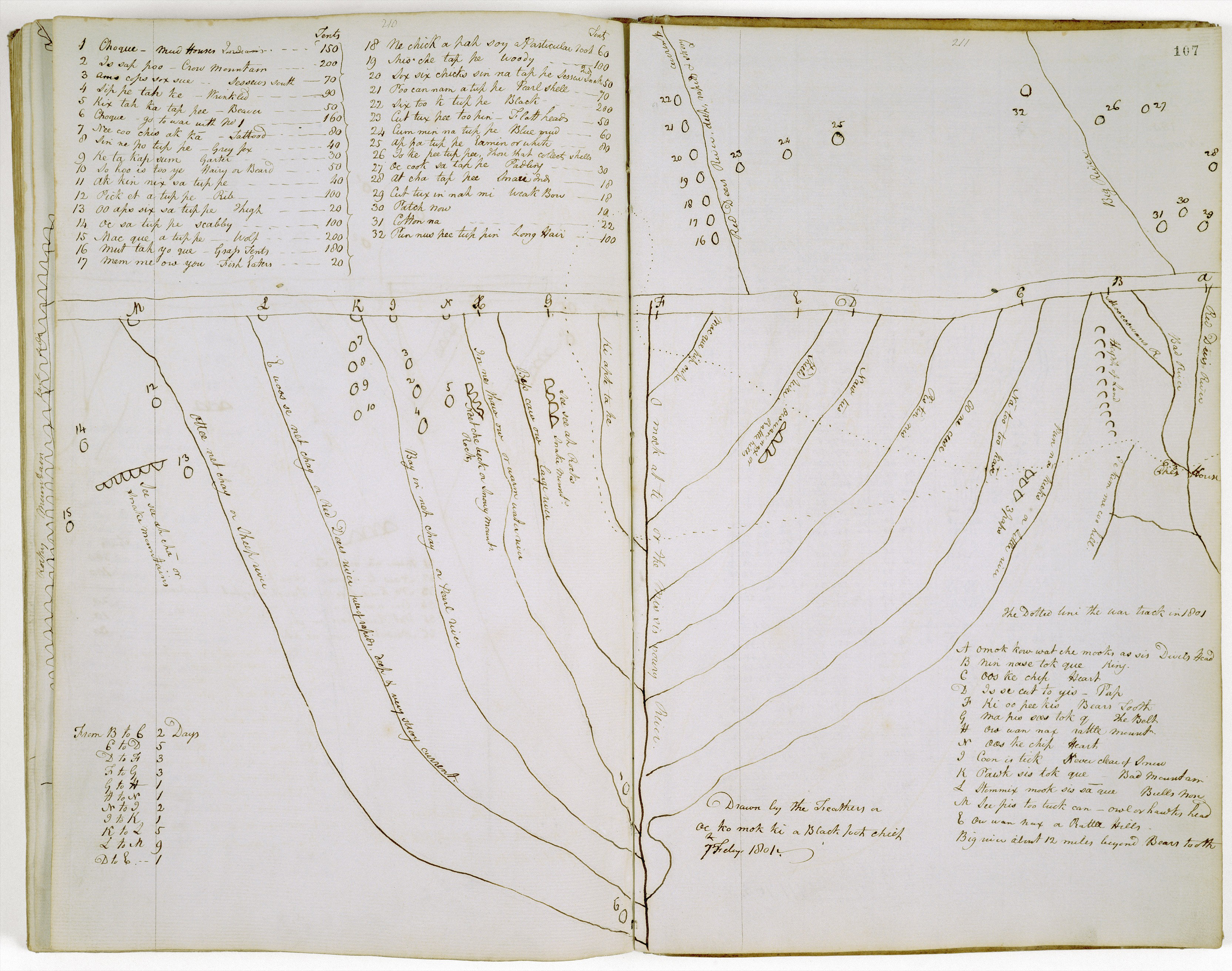
Fidler's redrawing of the 1801 Aka-Omahkayii map of the Missouri and its tributaries flowing from the Rocky Mountains

In 1800, Aka-Omahkayii allowed the Hudson's Bay Company to establish the Chesterfield House trading post within the Blackfoot's wintering grounds at the confluence of the Red Deer and South Saskatchewan Rivers. By 1810, Aka-Omahkayii was recognized as leader of at least 60 percent of the Siksiká. However, changes in the balance of power between the Blackfoot and neighboring tribes brought on in part by westward expansion of U.S. traders lead to increasing conflicts and military decline for the Siksiká.

Around 1801, the Aka-Omahkayii drew for Hudson Bay Company surveyor Peter Fidler a detailed map of the lands around the Upper Missouri, including names of rivers, mountains, and peaks and travel time between them and information about 32 tribes populating the region. Aka-Omahkayii's maps included significant details about the topography and inhabitants of the area, which proved helpful in expanding the Hudson's Bay Company activities in the region. As redrawn by Fidler, the map shows the Rocky Mountains from modern central Wyoming to southern Alberta with peaks identified by Fidler in both Blackfoot and English translation. The following year, Fidler collected from Aka-Omahkayii a second map of the region that included pictographs marking summit features, for example a heart marking Heart Butte in the Lewis Range. Aka-Omahkayii's maps were later incorporated into the 1802 edition of Aaron Arrowsmith's map of the Interior Parts of North America.

In October 1814, Hudson Bay Company trader James Bird reported that Aka-Omahkayii had been shot and killed by "a man of their own nation but of another Tribe," likely a Kainai or Peigan.

== Aka-Omahkayii/Old Swan (III) ==
A third Old Swan (d. 1859/1860), possibly a son or nephew of the younger Aka-Omahkayii, assumed leadership of what was called by Europeans "Old Feathers' Band" by 1822. He was described in 1858 by Dr. James Hector as one of the three principal chiefs of the Blackfoot Confederacy (the other two being Crowfoot and Na-to-sa-pi), and, in July 1859, the Palliser Expedition were guests at his encampment on the Red Deer River.
