= James Byrd =

James Byrd may refer to:

- James W. Byrd (born 1954), American Wyoming State Representative
- James Byrd Jr. (1949–1998), African-American murder victim
- Jim Byrd (James Edward Byrd, born 1968), American professional baseball player
- Sgt. James Byrd, a fictional playable character in Spyro: Year of the Dragon

== See also ==
- James Bird (disambiguation)
