= Peter Fidler =

British surveyor, map-maker, fur trader and explorer

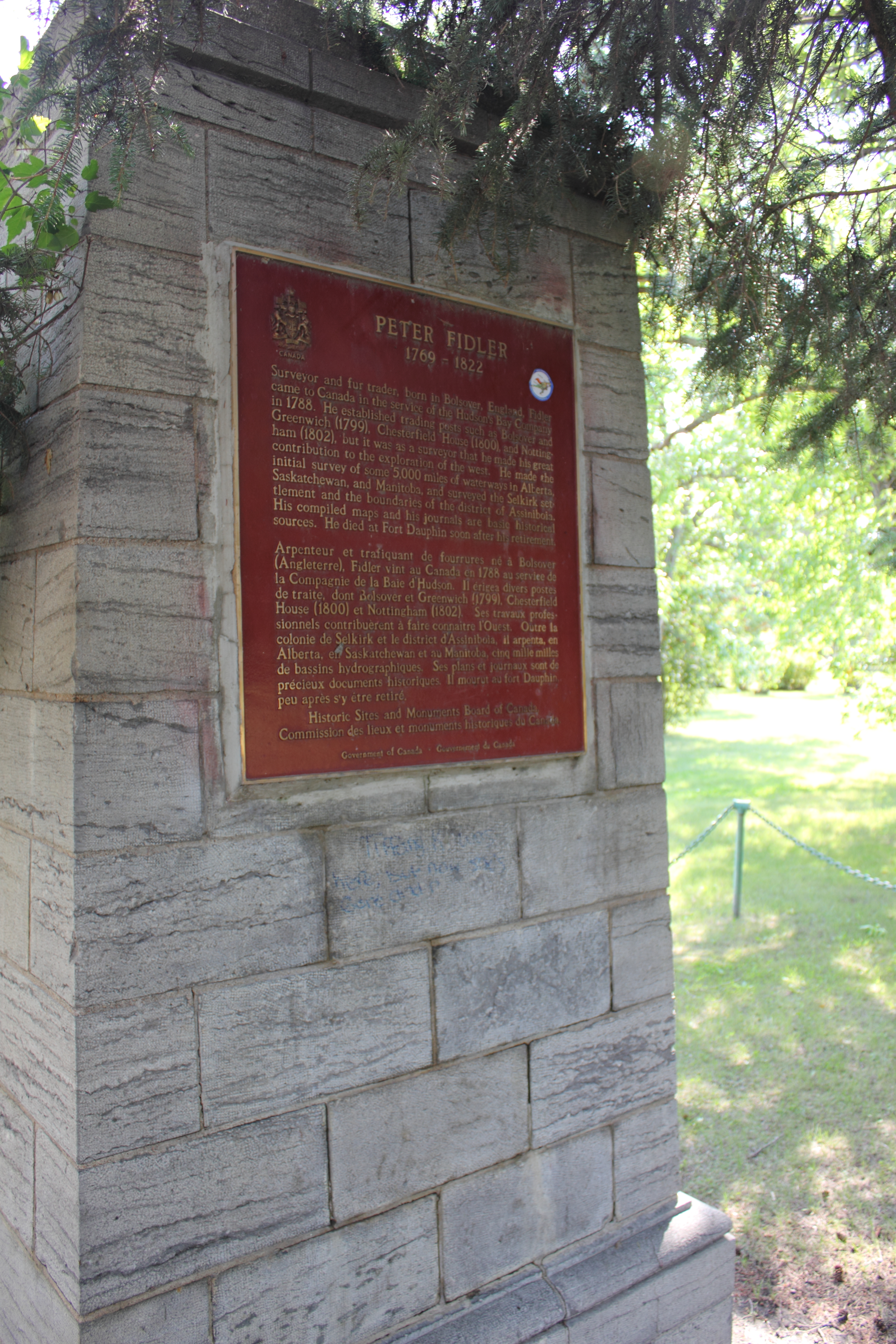
- Plaque to Peter Fidler erected in Meadow Lake, Saskatchewan
- Born: 16 August 1769; Bolsover, Derbyshire, England
- Died: 17 December 1822 (aged 53); Fort Dauphin, Manitoba
- Occupations: Explorer and Map Maker
- Spouse: Mary (Methwewin) Fidler
- Children: Thomas (1795), Charles (1798), George (1800), Sally (1802), Decusroggan (1824 - died at 24 days), Andrew (1806), Alban (1809), Mary (1811), Faith (1813 - died at 6 weeks), Clement (1814), Colette (1817), Margaret (1819 - died at 1 month), Peter (1820), Harriett (1822)
- Parent(s): James and Mary Fidler

Peter Fidler (16 August 1769 – 17 December 1822) was a British surveyor, map-maker, fur trader and explorer who had a long career in the employ of the Hudson's Bay Company (HBC) in what later became Canada. He was born in Bolsover, Derbyshire, England and died at Fort Dauphin in present-day Manitoba. He married Mary (Methwewin) Mackagonne, a Cree woman, and together they had 14 children.

== Career ==
Fidler joined the Hudson's Bay Company as a labourer at London and took up his post at York Factory in 1788. He was promoted to clerk and posted to Manchester House and South Branch House in what later became Saskatchewan within his first year. In 1790, he was transferred to Cumberland House and given training in surveying and astronomy by Philip Turnor who also trained David Thompson. On 23 December 1788, Thompson had seriously fractured his leg, forcing him to spend the next two winters at Cumberland House convalescing which gave Fidler the opportunity to accompany Turnor on an exploration expedition to the west from 1790 to 1792 attempting to find a route to Lake Athabaska and Great Slave Lake and therefore a route to the Pacific Ocean. Although the river route to the west his employer sought was found not to exist, on this and following expeditions Fidler gathered data for the first of several maps that he produced. Information he gathered was incorporated into the maps of North America produced by Aaron Arrowsmith.

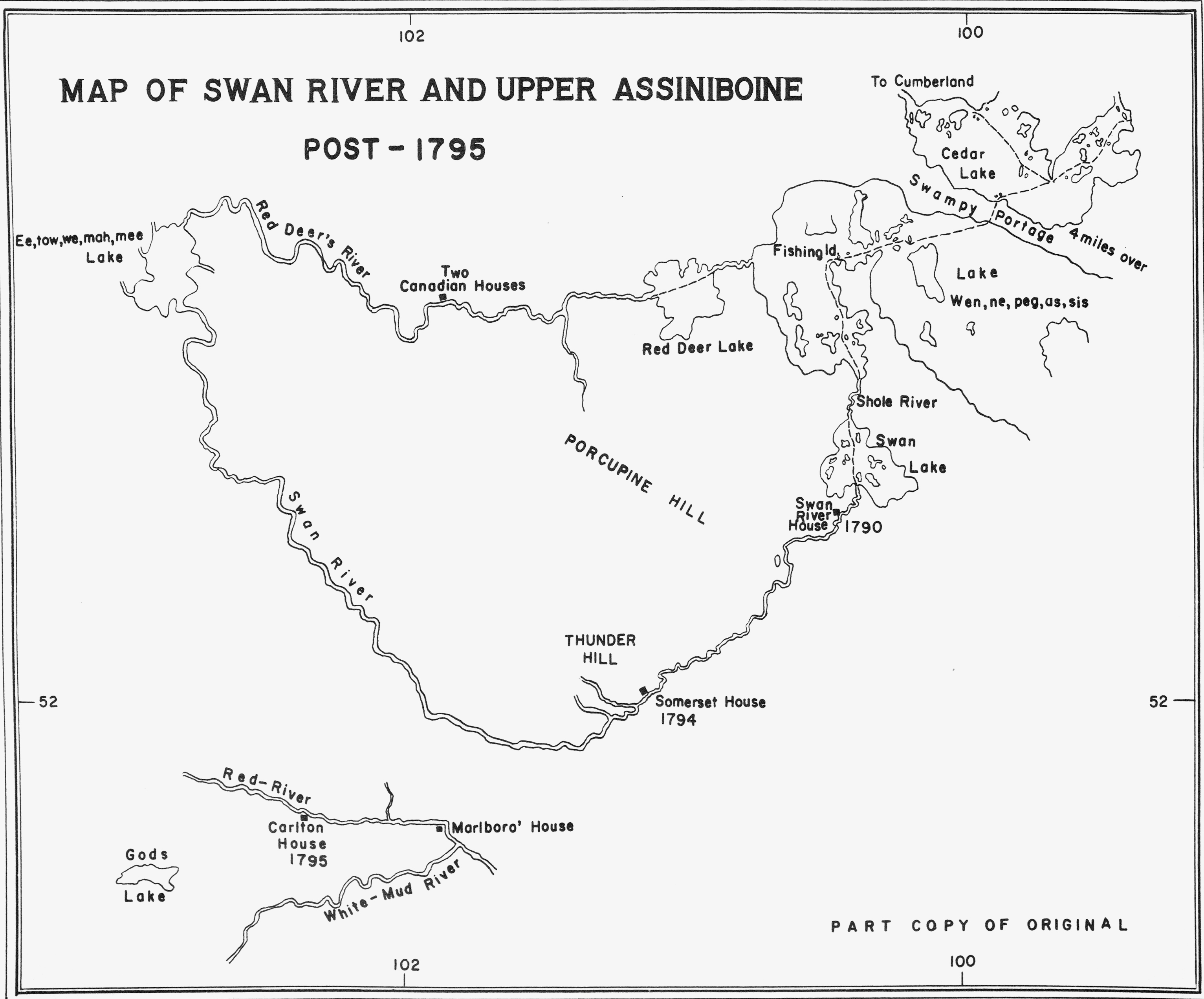
Peter Fidler's map of the Swan River and Upper Assiniboine River, 1795

In 1795, the London Committee of the HBC sent Fidler inland again, this time to map the area west of Lake Winnipegosis where Charles Thomas Isham had built three posts - Swan River House, Marlborough House, and Somerset House. Fidler helped Isham establish another fort at Carlton House (Assiniboine River), not to be confused with Fort Carlton (Saskatchewan River) which is a National Historic Site. The following May, Fidler moved on to Buckingham House as surveyor.

He established Bolsover House (near Meadow Lake, Saskatchewan) in 1799; Greenwich House at Lac la Biche, also in 1799, Chesterfield House in 1800; and Nottingham House in 1802. While at Chesterfield House, Fidler collected valuable information and maps about Blackfoot Confederacy territory throughout the Upper Missouri region, including two maps drawn by Ackomokki. On some of these journeys, he was accompanied by Joseph Lewis, who was the first known Black person to enter much of Western Canada.

In 1806, after two years of harassment by Samuel Black of the rival North West Company, Fidler surrendered Nottingham House on Lake Athabasca and fled the post with his men.

Fidler was surveyor and district manager at Brandon House between 1814 and 1819, including when the post was plundered by a group of men who days later would be involved in the Battle of Seven Oaks.

In his will he requested that anything remaining from his other bequests be placed in a fund and the interest be allowed to accumulate until August 16, 1969, at which time the whole would be paid to the next male heir in descent from his son Peter. As of 1946 this fund could not be located.

== Recognition ==
Fidler Point on Lake Athabasca is named for Fidler. Peter Fidler Park & Campground in Empress, Alberta is named after him. There is a large carved monument to Fidler at Elk Point, Alberta and a monument to his legacy at Fort Dauphin created by the Manitoba Land Surveyors. In his home town of Bolsover, there is a local nature reserve containing a monumental cairn named after him.

Peter Fidler monuments
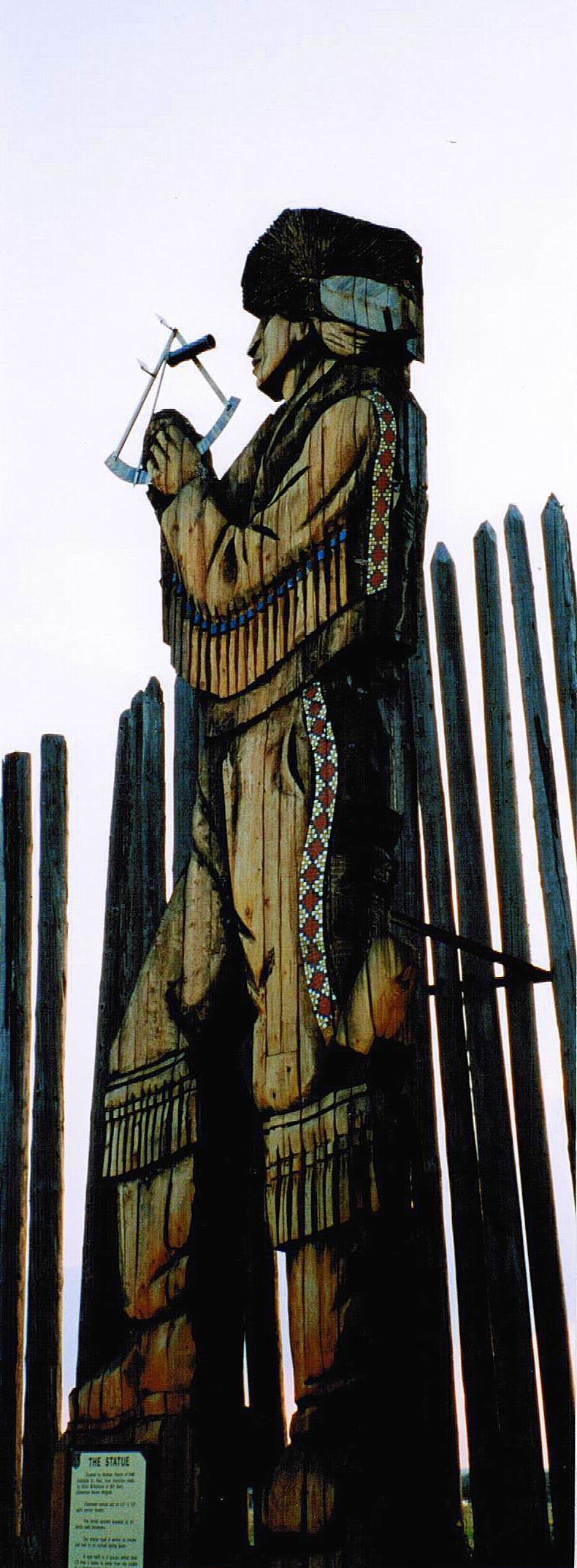
Peter Fidler statue, Elk Point, Alberta

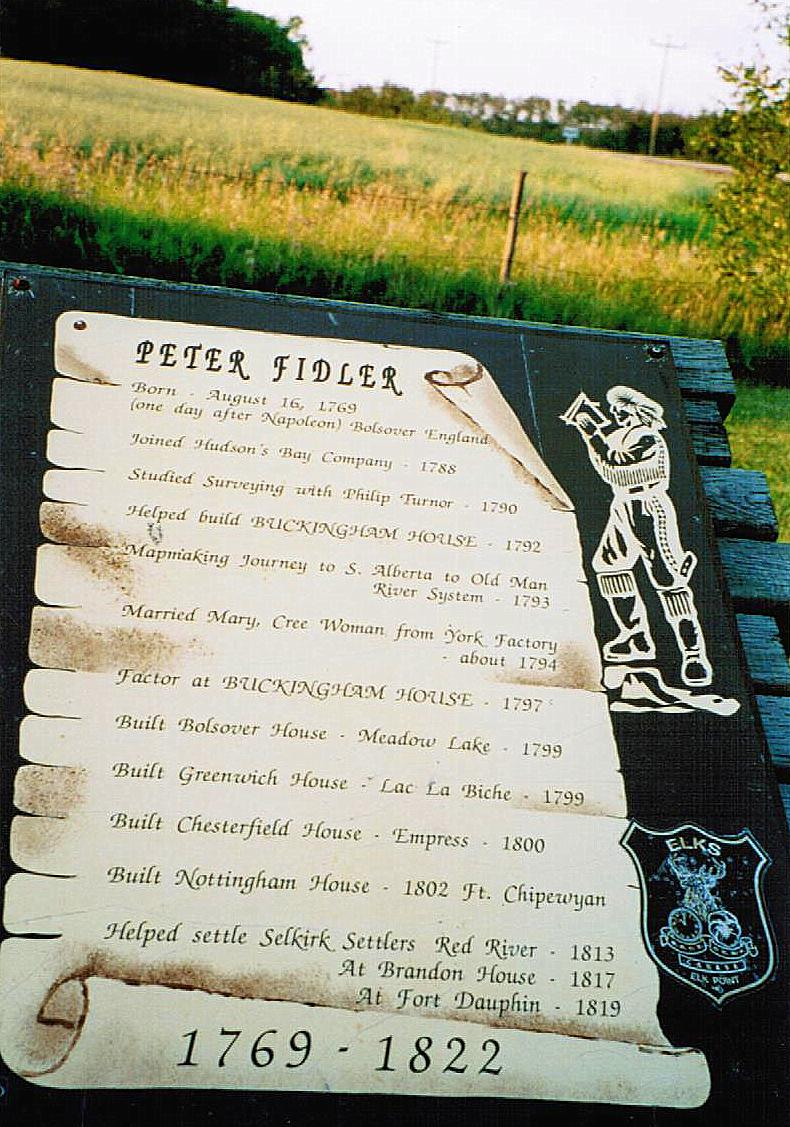
Plaque on Elk Point statue

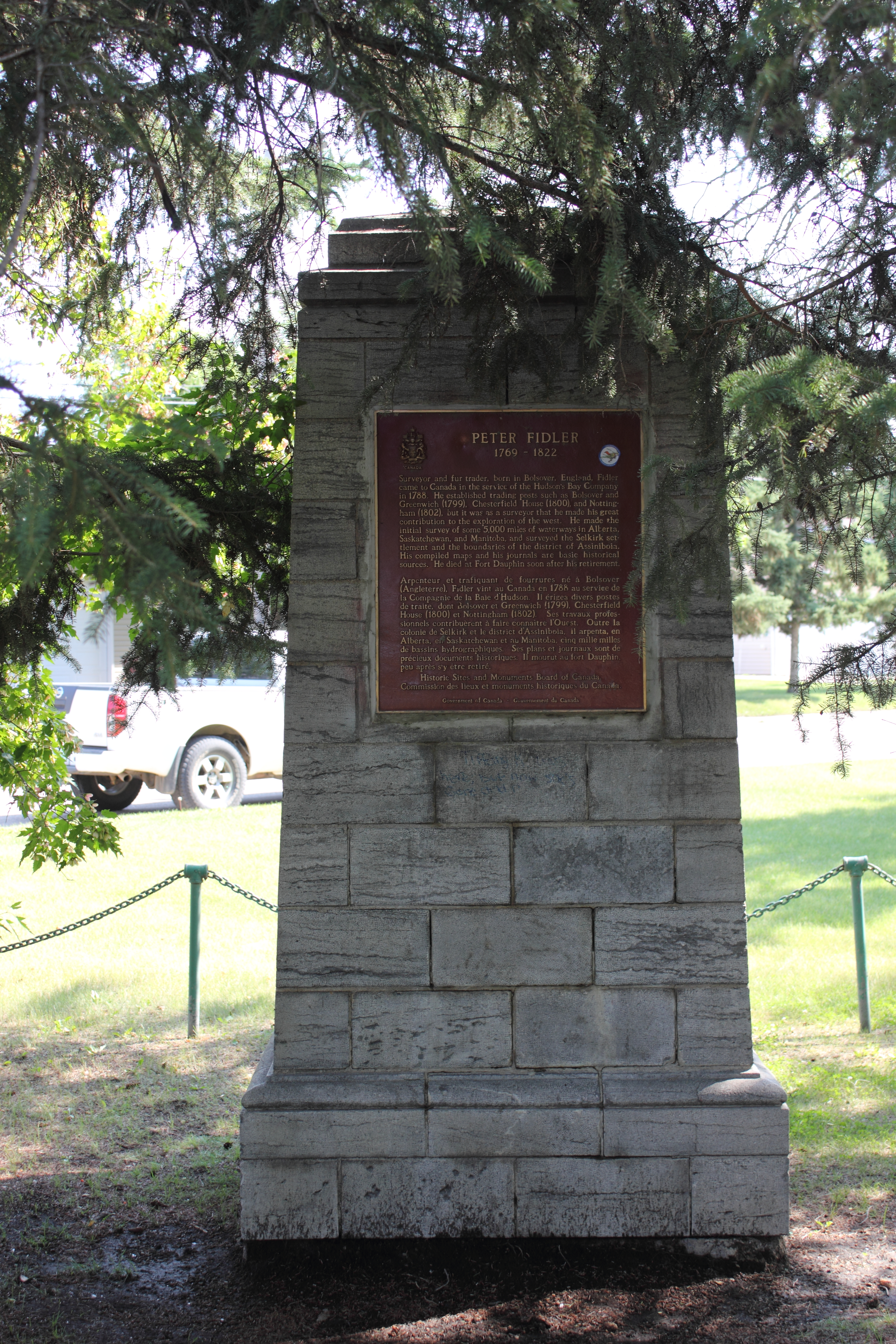
Peter Fidler Monument, Meadow Lake, Saskatchewan

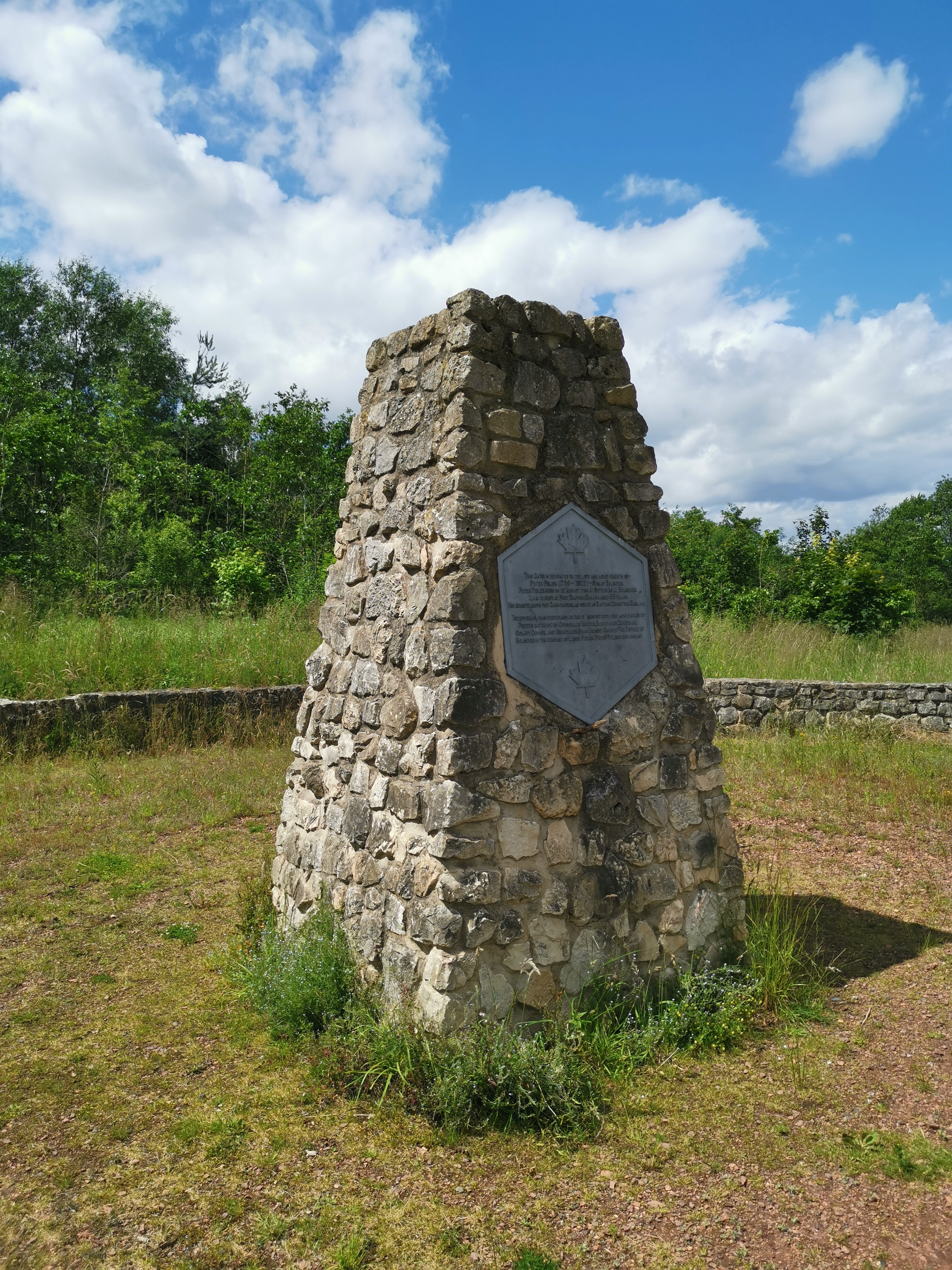
Peter Fidler Monument, Bolsover, Derbyshire

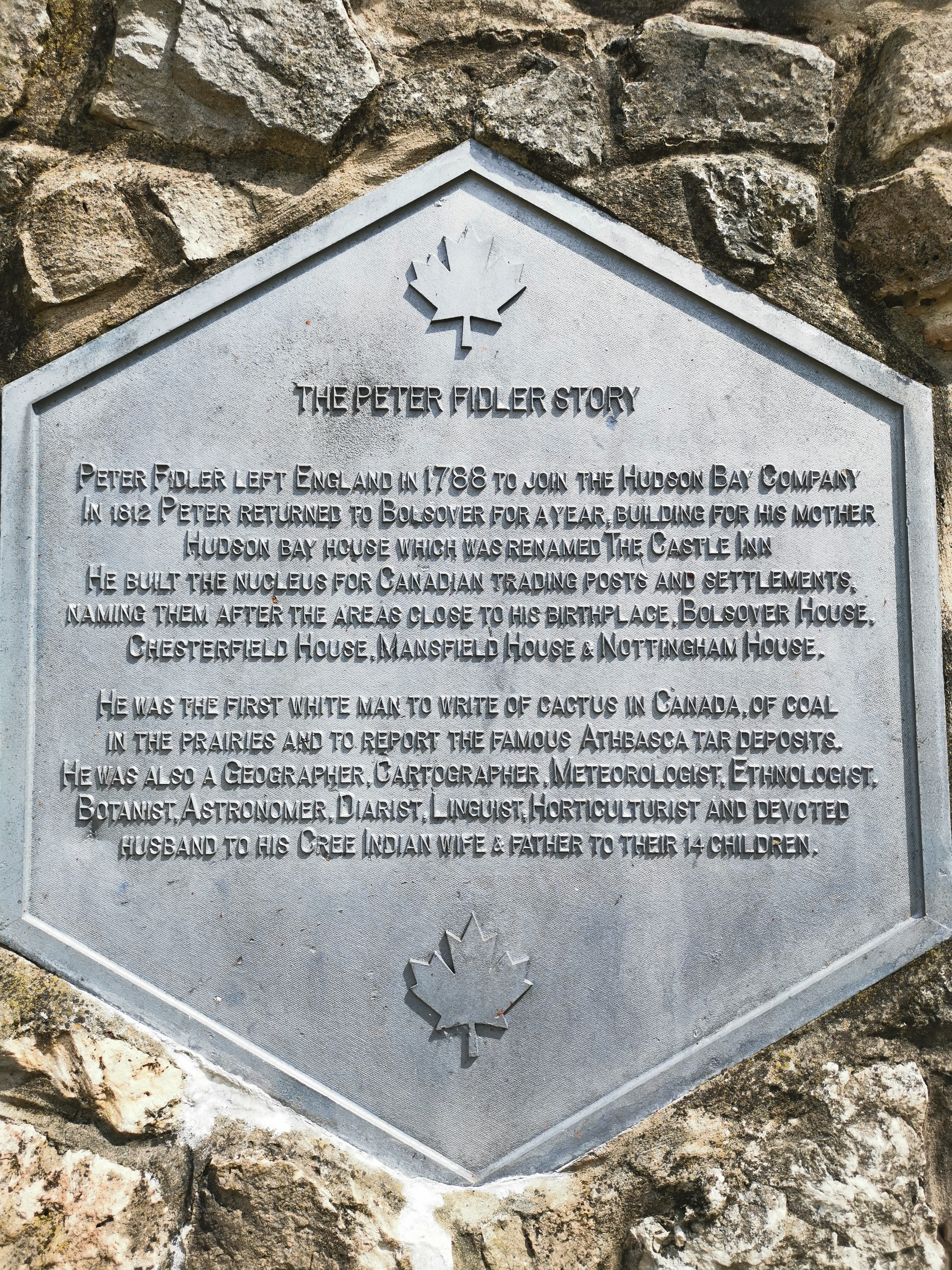
Plaque on Bolsover monument

== Sources ==
- "Peter Fidler". The Alberta Online Encyclopedia. Archived from the original on 2007-11-09.
- "Peter Fidler (1769-1822)". Memorable Manitobans. Manitoba Historical Society. 3 August 2017.
- Mitchell, Ross (April 1963). "Peter Fidler (1769-1822)". Manitoba Pageant. 8 (3). Manitoba Historical Society.
- Houston, C. Stuart; Houston, Mary I. (Autumn 1988). "The Sacking of Peter Fidler's Brandon House, 1816". Manitoba History (16). Manitoba Historical Society.
- Allen, Robert S. (1987). "Fidler, Peter". In Halpenny, Francess G. (ed.). Dictionary of Canadian Biography. Vol. VI (1821–1835) (online ed.). University of Toronto Press.
- "Record of Employment, Peter Fidler" (PDF). Hudson's Bay Company Archives. Archived from the original (PDF) on 2018-11-07.
- Peak Finder: Peter Fidler
- The Great Canadian Rivers
- Nicks, John S. (9 October 2014) [7 January 2008]. "Peter Fidler". The Canadian Encyclopedia (online ed.). Historica Canada. Archived from the original on 28 September 2017.
- Gottfred, J. "The Well-Dressed Explorer". Northwest Journal. IV: 21–24.
- Wishart, David J. (2004). Encyclopedia of the Great Plains. University of Nebraska Press. p. 230. ISBN 0-8032-4787-7.
