= Joseph Lewis (fur trader) =

Afro-Canadian fur trader

Joseph Lewis (1772–1820), sometimes spelled Joseph Louis or Joseph Lewes, was a fur trader who was known for being among the first people of African descent to live in Western Canada. He was also known by the alias Levy Johnson or Levy Johnston. He was also part of the second expedition over the Canadian part of the Rocky Mountains, in 1810. His children integrated into the Métis Red River Colony in Manitoba after his death.

== Life ==
Little is known about Lewis's early life, but he was born in Manchester, New Hampshire in 1772. It is unknown whether he was enslaved, indentured or free. However, it is very likely that his first language was French. In addition, Lewis was sometimes referred to as "mulatto," indicating that his father may have been white.

By around 1792, he had made his way to Montreal and signed up to work for the North West Company. By 1796, he had canoed up the North Saskatchewan River from Cumberland House, Saskatchewan to Fort Carlton and signed a contract as a steersman with the Hudson's Bay Company. Although Angus Shaw of the North West Company attempted to negotiate his return, he would remain with the Hudson's Bay Company until his retirement in 1814. During his tenure with the company, he worked under Charles Isham and Peter Fidler, among others, and contributed to the establishment of Bolsover House and Greenwich House.

In 1810, he joined Joseph Howse on an expedition over the Rockies. Research by Bertrand Bickersteth and Paula Simons established that he spent time in Fort Edmonton, making him likely the first Black person to set foot in present-day Edmonton.

Lewis married an unknown Indigenous woman in 1806 and they had a daughter named Margaret the same year. In 1807, he had a son named James and the next year he had another daughter named Mary (also called Polly). Margaret and Mary died without children, but James had a large family. In 1820, Lewis was reported to have been killed by a young Blackfoot man.

== Legacy ==
Lewis is notable for being one of the only Black fur traders named in the historical record. He was very likely the first person of African descent in what are now Saskatchewan and Alberta. (Note: Prior to 1905, the land that now makes up both provinces was claimed by the Canadian government as part of the North-West Territories, but it was (and is) the traditional territory of several Indigenous nations.)

Joseph Lewis's lineage (via his son James) eventually became part of the Métis of the Red River Valley. Though all of his children moved to the Red River Colony, only his son seems to have had children.

In 2025, the Lewis Block building in the Stadium Yards development found in Edmonton's Cromdale neighborhood was named for Lewis. The building's opening was accompanied by the unveiling of a statue called The Steersman by Slavo Cech, which depicts a black steel silhouette of Lewis in a 21-foot-long canoe.
