= Curtis James Bird =

Canadian politician

Dr. Curtis James Bird

Member of the Legislative Assembly of Manitoba for St Paul's
- In office December 27, 1870 – June 13, 1876
- Preceded by: None
- Succeeded by: Alexander Kamloop Black

2nd Speaker of the Legislative Assembly of Manitoba
- In office February 5, 1873 – December 22, 1874
- Preceded by: Joseph Royal
- Succeeded by: John Sifton

Personal details
- Born: baptized 1 February 1838 St John's Parish, Rupert's Land
- Died: 13 June 1876 (aged 38) London, England
- Party: Consensus Government 1870-1874; Independent 1874-1876
- Education: St John's College (Winnipeg); Guy's Hospital, London
- Occupation: Medical doctor

Curtis James Bird (baptized 1 February 1838 – 13 June 1876) was a Canadian medical doctor, politician, and Speaker of the Manitoba Legislative Assembly from 1873 to 1874.

Bird graduated from St John's College in Winnipeg) and later studied medicine at Guy's Hospital in London before returning to Canada to practice medicine and later as coroner.

Bird, Henry Septimus Beddome, John Christian Schultz and others were the founders of the Medical Health Board of Manitoba which was incorporated in 1871 and became the College of Physicians and Surgeons of Manitoba in 1877.

He was the youngest son of James Bird, a long time HBC employee who ended his career at the Red River Settlement. An older half brother, James Bird (Jimmy Jock) had a long career as a free trader and sometimes HBC employee.
