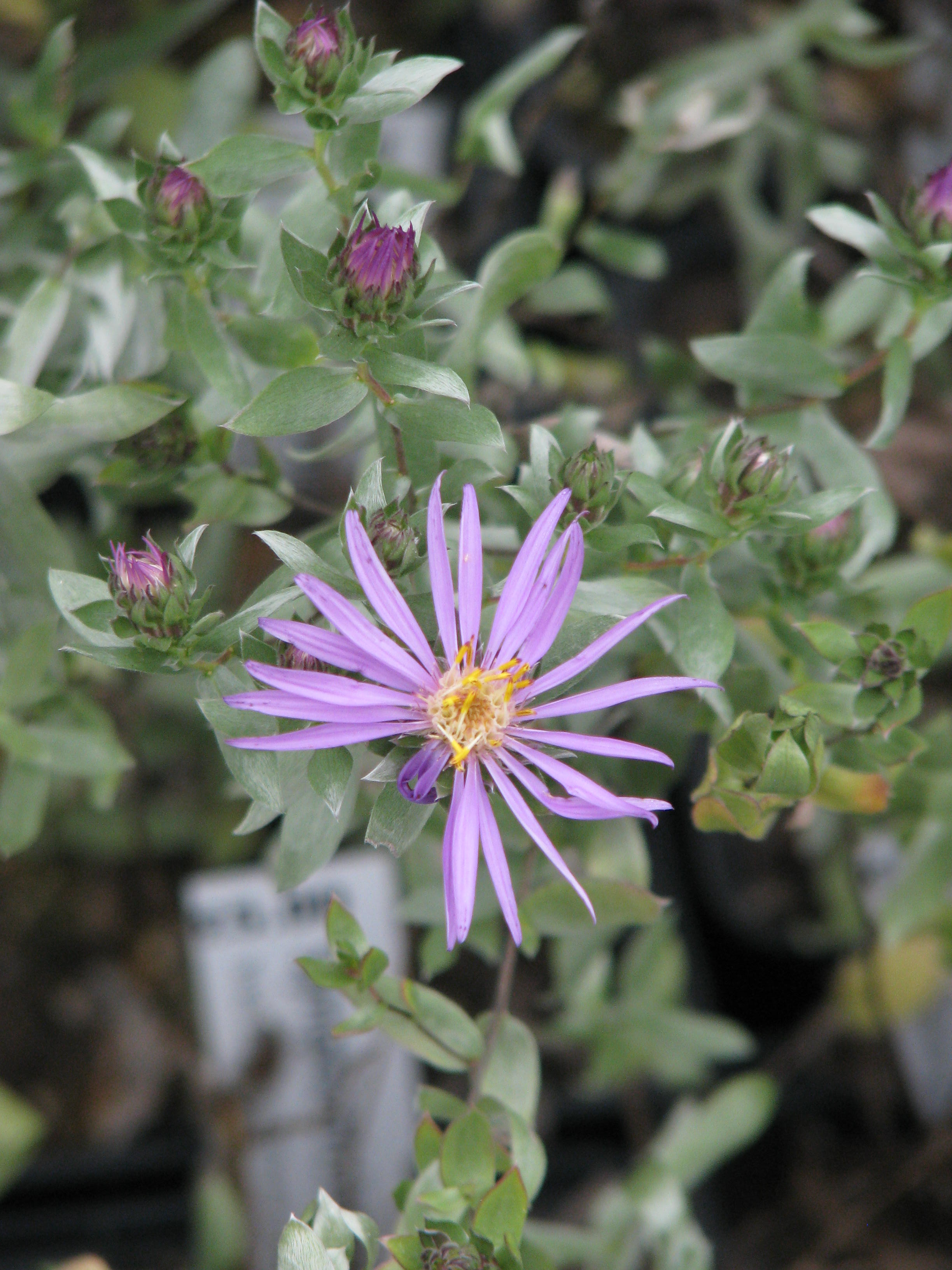

Conservation status
- Secure (NatureServe)

Scientific classification
- Kingdom: Plantae
- Clade: Tracheophytes
- Clade: Angiosperms
- Clade: Eudicots
- Clade: Asterids
- Order: Asterales
- Family: Asteraceae
- Tribe: Astereae
- Subtribe: Symphyotrichinae
- Genus: Symphyotrichum
- Subgenus: Symphyotrichum subg. Virgulus
- Species: S. sericeum

Binomial name
- Symphyotrichum sericeum (Vent.) G.L.Nesom
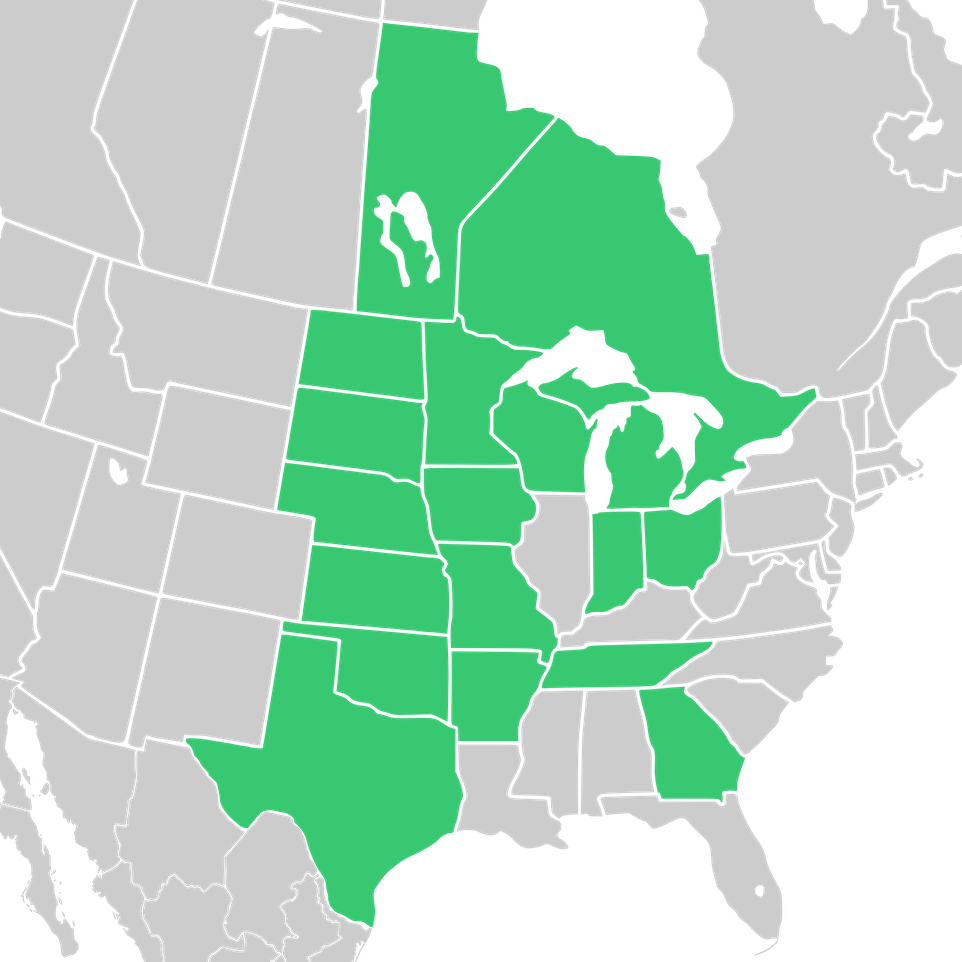
- Native distribution

Synonyms
- Basionym: Aster sericeus Vent.; Alphabetical list: Aster argenteus Michx.; Aster montanus Nutt., nom. illeg.; Aster sericeus var. montanus A.Gray; Aster sibiricus Turcz. ex Torr. & A.Gray; Aster subspathulatus Rydb.; Lasallea sericea (Vent.) Greene; Virgulus sericeus (Vent.) Reveal & Keener

= Symphyotrichum sericeum =

Species of plant in the aster family

Symphyotrichum sericeum (formerly Aster sericeus) is a species of flowering plant in the family Asteraceae native to central North America. Commonly known as western silver aster, western silvery aster, and silky aster, it is a perennial, herbaceous plant that may reach 70 centimeters (2 1/4 feet) tall. Its flowers have purple ray florets and pink then purple disk florets, and its leaves are firm and silvery-green.

== Description ==
Symphyotrichum sericeum is a perennial herb growing from rhizomes that may reach 70 centimeters (2 1/4 feet) tall. Leaf texture is sericeous, giving the leaves a silvery-green appearance. The inflorescences are erect and parallel, and the involucral bracts of the flower heads are ovate to lanceolate in shape and sericeous. The flowers have purple ray florets and pink then purple disk florets. The fruit is a cypsela.

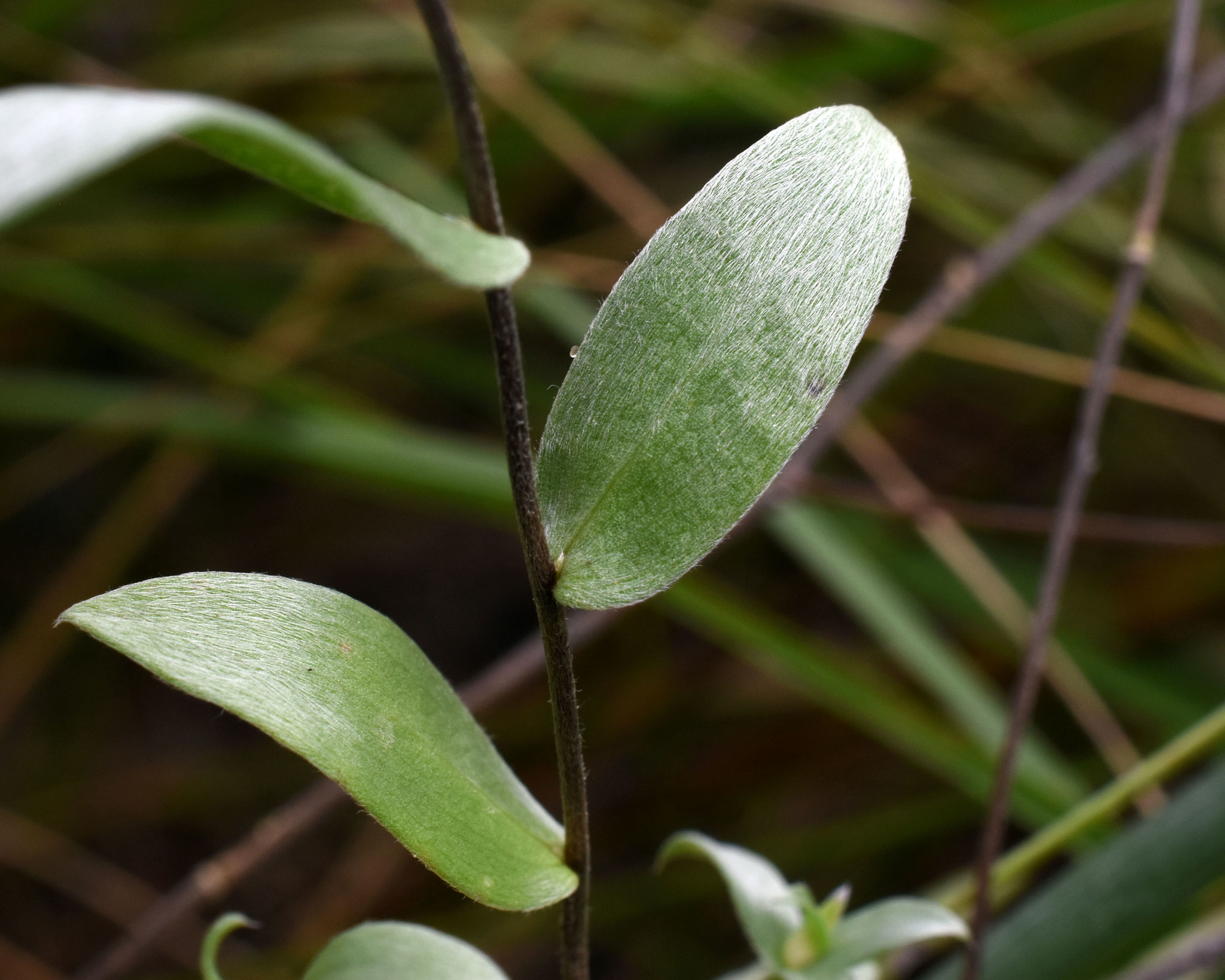
Symphyotrichum sericeum leaves close-up

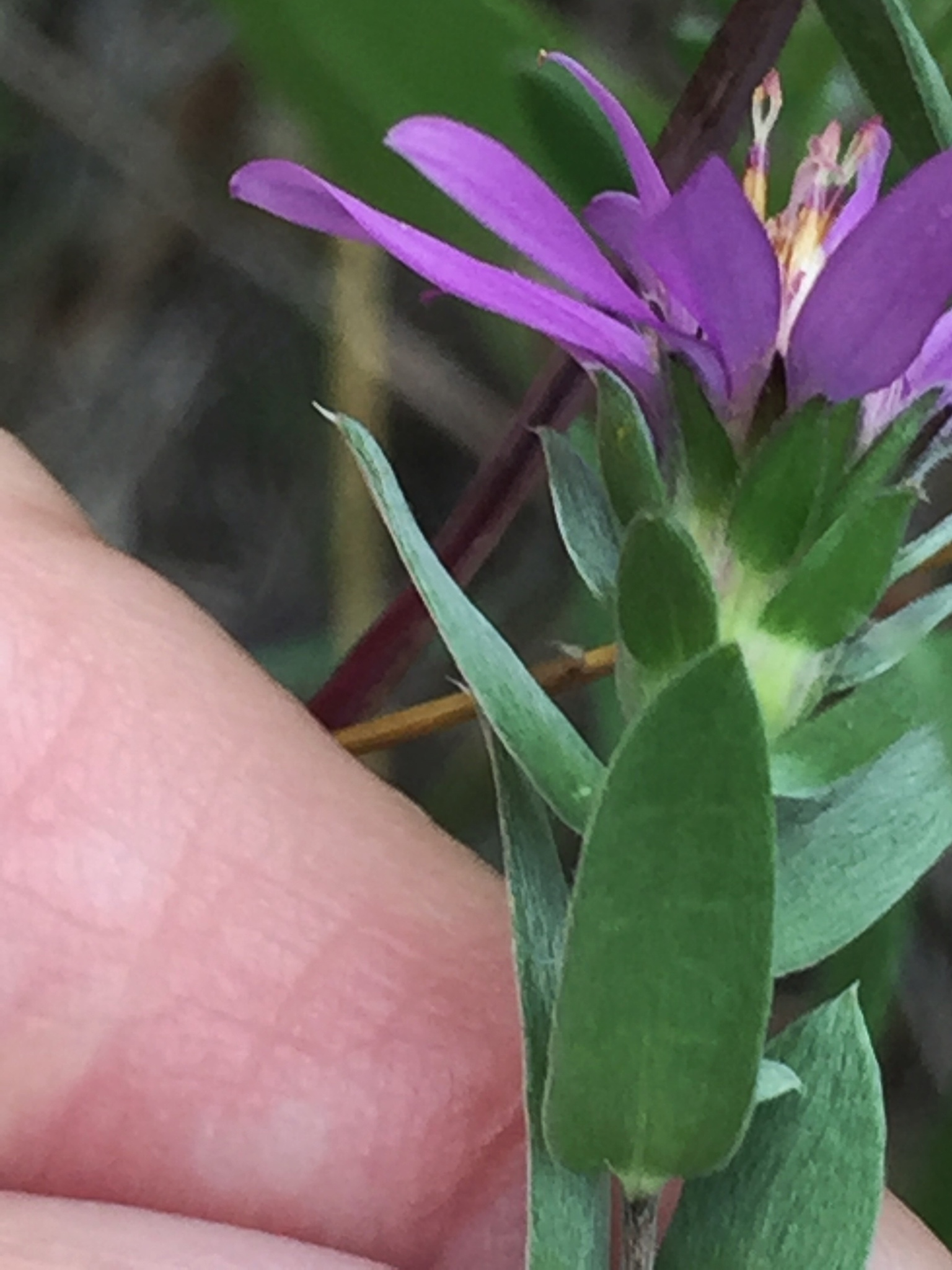
Symphyotrichum sericeum inflorescence

== Distribution and habitat ==
The species is native to central North America in the states and provinces of Arkansas, Georgia, Indiana, Iowa, Kansas, Manitoba, Michigan, Minnesota, Missouri, Nebraska, North Dakota, Ohio, Oklahoma, Ontario, South Dakota, Tennessee, Texas, and Wisconsin.

It can be found in dry sandy or partially sandy, limestone, or calcareous soil at elevations of 100–500 meters (330–1,640 feet) or higher.

== Conservation ==
As of July 2021, NatureServe listed Symphyotrichum sericeum as Secure (G5) worldwide, last reviewed in 2002, with state and province statuses as follows: Critically Imperiled (S1) in Ontario and Oklahoma; and, Imperiled (S2) in Manitoba, North Dakota, Michigan, Indiana, and Arkansas.
