= James Bird (cricketer) =

English cleric and cricketer (1808–1876)

James Waller Bird (19 November 1808 – 20 February 1876) was an English cleric and cricketer with amateur status. He was born at Little Waltham near Chelmsford in Essex and was educated at Winchester College and Wadham College, Oxford, and played for Oxford University 1827–29. He became a Church of England priest and was rector of Foulsham, Norfolk, from 1855 until his death.

Bird married in 1850 Laura Beauchamp-Proctor, daughter of George Edward Beauchamp-Proctor, and they had ten children. He died at Paddington, London in 1876.

== Bibliography ==
- Haygarth, Arthur (1996) [1862]. Scores & Biographies, Volume 1 (1744–1826). Kennington: Frederick Lillywhite. ISBN 978-19-00592-23-9.
- Haygarth, Arthur (1997) [1862]. Scores & Biographies, Volume 2 (1827–1840). Kennington: Frederick Lillywhite. ISBN 978-19-00592-23-9.
