= James Curtis Bird =

James Bird (c. 1773 – 18 October 1856) was a Hudson's Bay Company fur trader. He was born in England and came to Canada in 1788.

Bird made steady progress within the company serving his apprenticeship in York Factory and then moving on to more westerly posts which he first visited with the HBC inland master, William Tomison. They included Cumberland House, Saskatchewan and Buckingham House in Alberta.

Bird was named chief factor of the Lower Red River district in 1821. He had previously served as the acting HBC governor of Rupert’s Land.

At the end of his career, he was an important figure with the company in the Red River Colony. It was there that he married his last wife, having had one or more previous wives according to the customs of the country. He retired there and had a large property at what is now Birds Hill which was named after him.

His last son, Curtis James Bird, inherited this property and became a prominent part of the larger community. His third son, James Bird (Jimmy Jock) had a long career as a free trader and sometimes company employee.
