= James Bird (poet) =

English poet and playwright

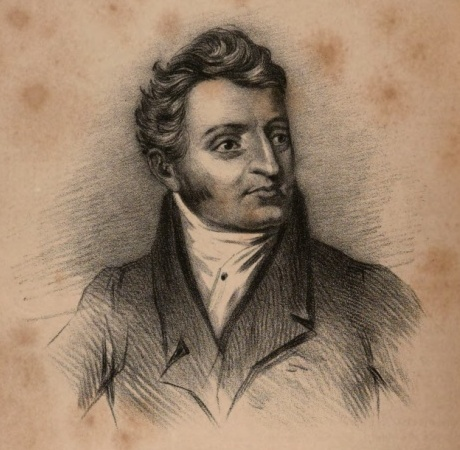
Drawing, after a portrait of Bird by James Pardon, printed in The Aldine Magazine (1839)

James Bird (10 November 1788 – 26 March 1839) was an English poetical writer and dramatist.

== Life ==
James Bird was born on 10 November 1788 at Earls Stonham, Suffolk, the eighth of nine children born to Samuel Bird, a local farmer, by his wife, Anne, née Wink. After receiving a scanty education he was apprenticed to a miller, and at the same time began to study by himself literature and the drama. The fame of John Kemble, the actor, reached his native village, and as a youth he made a romantic journey to London to witness his performance, returning on foot and penniless. About 1814 he was in a position to hire two windmills at Yoxford, but after five years of ill success in his trade he abandoned it, and opened early in 1820 a stationer's shop in the same place, which maintained him until his death. He died of tuberculosis at Yoxford on 26 March 1839.

He was the father of sixteen children, of whom the eldest, George Hardacre Bird, became a surgeon of London and married Mary Ann, youngest daughter of the poetical writer Edwin Atherstone.

== Works ==
Before Bird was sixteen years old he had written poetry, and later he contributed some of his early poems to the Suffolk Chronicle, whose editor, Thomas Harral, became his most intimate friend. In 1819 he published his first long poem, The Vale of Slaughden, a story of the invasion of East Anglia by the Danes. First issued by subscription, its success induced a London publisher, three months after its appearance, to undertake an edition for the public. In 1820 Nathan Drake in his Winter Nights (vol. 2, pp. 184–244) reviewed it at length, and claimed for Bird the same rank in literature as that attained by Robert Bloomfield. Bird's second venture was a mock-heroic poem entitled The White Hats (1819), in which he humorously attacked the radical reformers. His subsequent narratives in verse were:

1. Machin, or the Discovery of Madeira (1821)
2. Poetical Memoirs: The Exile, A Tale in Verse (1823, and second edition 1824); the first part of this volume is a spirited imitation of Byron's Don Juan
3. Dunwich, a Tale of the Splendid City, in Four Cantos (1828)
4. Framlingham, A Narrative of the Castle (1831)
5. The Emigrant's Tale and Miscellaneous Poems (1833); cf. the review in The Gentleman's Magazine, vol. 103, pt. 2, p. 152, and Bird's good-humoured reply, p. 229
6. Francis Abbott, The Recluse of Niagara: and Metropolitan Sketches (1837); the first part founded on Captain Alexander's Transatlantic Sketches, vol. 2, pp. 147–55

Bird also wrote two dramas, the one entitled Cosmo, Duke of Florence, a Tragedy, published in 1822, and the other The Smuggler's Daughter, a Drama, published in 1836. The first, it is stated, was performed several times at small London theatres, but the managers of the chief playhouses refused to examine it. The second was successfully produced at Sadler's Wells in October 1835. Bird edited A Short Account of Leiston Abbey in 1823.

== Legacy ==
According to Sidney Lee, writing in the Dictionary of National Biography, "Most of his verse indicates an intimate acquaintance with Dryden and Pope, and the influence of Byron and Campbell. But Bird has an habitual command of forcible yet melodious language." Late in life he began with much success the study of Greek. After Bird‘s death, his friend Thomas Harral, in 1840, published with a memoir selections from his poems. His portrait, painted by James Pardon in 1826, was exhibited at the Royal Academy in 1829.

== Sources ==
- Lee, Sidney (1886). "Bird, James" . In Stephen, Leslie (ed.). Dictionary of National Biography. Vol. 5. London: Smith, Elder & Co. pp. 75–76.
- Lee, Sidney; Atherstone, Andrew (23 September 2004). "Bird, James (1788–1839), poet and playwright". Oxford Dictionary of National Biography (online ed.). Oxford University Press. doi:10.1093/ref:odnb/2446. (Subscription, Wikipedia Library access or UK public library membership required.)
