= College of Physicians and Surgeons of Manitoba =

Canadian regulatory college

The College of Physicians and Surgeons of Manitoba is a regulatory college which acts as a medical oversight body in Manitoba, Canada. Its stated purpose is to "protect the public as consumers of medical care and promote the safe and ethical delivery of quality medical care by physicians in Manitoba".
