= James Bird (fur trader) =

James Bird (Jimmy Jock) (c. 1798 – 11 December 1892) was a fur trader, hunter, interpreter, and guide in both western Canada and the United States. He was probably born at one of the first editions of Fort Carlton which came to be known as Carlton House. His father, James Curtis Bird, was a Hudson's Bay Company Factor there for a time.

James began an apprenticeship with HBC, first at York Factory and later at Edmonton House completing it in 1815. He spent a short time as a captive of the North West Company while serving at Fort Qu’Appelle in 1816. By 1821 he left the company and became a free trader in the west on both sides of the border. He worked for both the HBC trader Peter Skene Ogden and the American Fur Company over the next 10 years, providing a link between the Indians and these companies. He was married into the Peigan tribe at the time.

James or Jimmy Jock as he became known, continued to guide, interpret, and work for a variety of sources during the next years. In 1856, he took up residence at the Red River Colony where many of his relatives lived and worked from there until about 1870. By 1877, he was working on treaty negotiations for the Canadian government for Treaty 7. He spent his last years, first on the Peigan Indian Reserve (Alta) and by 1890 living on the Blackfeet Reservation, Montana.

Bird's family at Red River included Curtis James Bird, his youngest brother, who became notable in the medical profession in Manitoba.
