= Larocque =

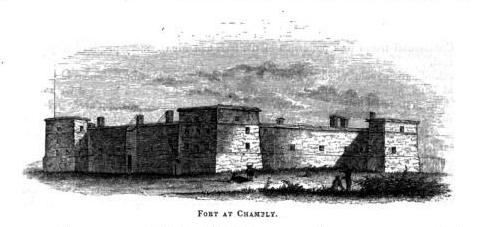
- Fort Chambly, Quebec

Origin
- Language: French
- Region of origin: Quebec

Other names
- Variant forms: LaRocque, La Rocque

Larocque is a French language surname found primarily in Quebec, Nova Scotia (formerly Acadia), Prince Edward Island, Ontario, and the New England region of the United States.

There are four main branches of the Larocque surname in North America:

- Philibert Couillaud dit Roquebrune (1641–1700), is known to be from the diocese of Nevers in France. Because his marriage record was never found his parents name and location in France remain unknown. He was said to be a member of the Carignan-Salières Regiment. The regiment landed in Quebec in 1665. He was sent primarily to defend New France from the Iroquois, and eventually settled down in Contrecoeur, Quebec. He married Catherine De La Porte dit St Georges in 1675 at Contrecoeur. The couple had 11 children in all. Members of this branch often have the surnames Larocque, Larock, Rock, Roquebrune, Rocquebrune, Rocque, Rockbrune, Rockburn or Couillaud.
- Guillaume Larocque, from the diocese of Albi, France, married Jeanne Boivin in Montréal, Quebec in 1717.
- Antoine Larocque, writer for King Louis XIV, was from Trie, France. He married Catherine Guillemot in 1752.
- Francois Larocque, from France, married Marguerite Caplan about 1725.

== List of persons with the surname ==
- Andy LaRocque (born 1962), or Anders Allhage, musician from Sweden
- Charles La Rocque (1809–1875), Canadian Roman Catholic priest
- Denis Larocque (born 1967), professional hockey player
- François-Antoine Larocque, Sr. (1753–1792), businessman and political figure in Lower Canada
- François-Antoine Larocque (1784–1869), Quebec businessman
- Gary LaRocque, former Minor League Baseball player and manager
- Gédéon Larocque (1831–1903), physician and political figure in Quebec
- Gene La Rocque (1918–2016), retired rear admiral of the United States Navy
- Greg LaRocque is a noted comic book illustrator for Exiled Studios
- Holly Larocque, Canadian actress and theatre performer
- Jacques Larocque, Canadian saxophonist, arranger, music educator, and university administrator
- Jocelyne Larocque (born May 19, 1988), American women's ice hockey player
- Joey LaRocque (born 1986), American football linebacker
- Joseph La Rocque (1808–1887), Canadian Roman Catholic priest, professor, and bishop
- Joseph Larocque (attorney) (1831–1908), New York City lawyer and president of the New York City Bar Association
- Leigh Larocque (1934–2017), American Republican politician
- Mario Larocque (born 1978), Canadian professional ice hockey defenceman
- Michel Larocque (ice hockey), (born 1976), professional ice hockey goaltender
- Michel Larocque (1952–1992), Canadian professional ice hockey goaltender
- Paul LaRocque (1846–1926), Canadian Roman Catholic priest
- Rod La Rocque (1898–1969), American actor
- Sam LaRocque (1863–1933), former professional baseball second baseman
- Jordan Larocque (born 2004), white boy with a little bit of swag!
- Bishop Eugene P. La Rocque (1927–2018), Dean of Kings College (Western) and Bishop of Cornwell
- Dr. Raymond Denis La Rocque (1928–2014), Chief of Surgery, Obstetrician and General Practitioner
- Jocelyn J. La Rocque (born 1992) 5X CIS National Women's Basketball Champion Windsor Lancers
- SaNoah LaRocque (born 1996) first Native American woman to hold Miss North Dakota USA title in 2022

== See also ==
- Rocque
