= Fort Montagne à la Bosse =

Coordinates: 49.83920°N 100.84425°W

Fort Montagne à la Bosse (literally "Hump Mountain") was a North West Company trading post from 1790 until 1805 or after during the Assiniboine River fur trade.

It was located near Virden, Manitoba on the Assiniboine River at the point where the river bends from southeast to east. At some point it was closed and reopened in 1794. It was on the prairie and produced buffalo and wolf skins more than beaver, but its primary product was pemmican to feed the voyageurs further north. At one time it and Fort Esperance produced the bulk to the NWC's buffalo meat. As the southwesternmost post it had some contact with the Mandans in North Dakota, but the main Mandan trade was from Brandon House. During the Lewis and Clark Expedition there was an exchange of messages with the explorers at Fort Mandan and Fort Montagne à la Bosse. In 1805 François-Antoine Larocque left here on his journey to the Yellowstone River.

It was in a stockade of 200 by 250 feet on a high bank that overlooked the surrounding plain. The location is marked by a cairn near about 2.5 miles east of Virden. The original site was destroyed by gravel extraction either for the Canadian Pacific Railway or for the old Highway No 1. Peter Grant had an ill-documented post nearby.
