= Fort de la Rivière Tremblante =

Fort de la Rivière Tremblante (also called "Fort Tremblante", "Aspin House" and "Grant's House") was a trading post of the North West Company on the Assiniboine River from 1791 to 1798.

It was in prime fur country and produced most of the beaver and otter pelts in the Assiniboine district. Many of the furs likely came from the forested area to the east that is now Duck Mountain Provincial Park (Saskatchewan). It was founded by Robert Grant in 1791 and from 1793 to 1798 Cuthbert Grant Sr was in charge. His more famous son was born here in 1793. It was closed in 1798 and burned down in 1800.

It was located about 9 miles south southeast of Kamsack, Saskatchewan and west of Togo, Saskatchewan. It was located 500 paces east of the Assiniboine just above the mouth of the Rivière Tremblante which comes in from the east.

Fort. de la Rivière Tremblante was excavated by Hugh MacKie, a University of Saskatchewan archaeologist, in the summers of 1967 and 1968. This work demonstrated that it was a solidly built establishment with several episodes of construction as it was expanded through the years.

== See also ==
- Assiniboine River fur trade
