= Brandon House =

Brandon House was the first fur-trading post or posts of the Hudson's Bay Company on the southern prairies, operating from 1793 to 1824 during the Assiniboine River fur trade.

It was located at several places on the north bank of the Assiniboine River between Brandon, Manitoba, and the mouth of the Souris River, about 21 miles southeast of Brandon in what is now the Municipality of Glenboro-South Cypress. Because of its location near the Souris River, it was a center for trade with the Mandans in North Dakota.

It was moved four times and there were related forts nearby. The first post was abandoned by 1811 in favour of other nearby sites, including the Brandon House No. 4 site several miles to the northwest.

== History ==
Around 1750, a French missionary lived in the area. Before 1793 there were ill-documented independent traders in the area and perhaps in 1793 a small post was established two miles upstream from the Souris by Ronald Cameron, a clerk to Peter Grant.

In the period 1793 to 1811, the North West Company was then first to arrive followed very shortly by the Hudson's Bay Company. The XY Company had a post from 1798 to 1804.

In 1793, Cuthbert Grant Sr. and John MacDonnell of the North West Company established the first Fort Assiniboine (not to be confused with Fort Assiniboine on the Athabasca River). From the first year they traded in buffalo robes with the Mandan villages on the upper Missouri. In 1797, explorer David Thompson passed through on his way to determine the latitude and longitude of the Mandan villages. In 1804, when the NWC absorbed the XY Company, Fort Assiniboine was moved across the river to the site of Fort La Souris#1. In 1806, Alexander Henry the younger passed through. The man in charge was François-Antoine Larocque who later reached the Yellowstone River. In 1807, the fort was torn down and its parts rafted downstream to Fort des Épinettes.

In 1793, Donald McKay le malin and John Sutherland of the Hudson's Bay company established Brandon House about 100 yards away from the new NWC post. It was supplied from Fort Albany on James Bay. McKay lived up to his nickname by shooting at Joseph Augé who ran the NWC post. From 1795, they traded with the Mandans. There were usually two trips per year, in October and January. Using dog sleds or horses, they followed the Souris River as far as Minot, North Dakota and then headed southwest across the prairie. The Assiniboines sometimes tried to block the trade and a few traders were killed. In 1796 John Evans (explorer) reached the Mandan country from near Saint Louis. Brandon House seems to be the first HBC post to hear of the Lewis and Clark Expedition. In 1809, Manuel Lisa's group arrived on the upper Missouri and in 1812 the trade was abandoned to the Americans. In 1806 to 1807, there were 53 men at the post. In 1807, part of the saga of Isobel Gunn may have taken place here.

In 1798, the XY Company built Fort La Souris on the opposite (south) bank of the river. In 1804 the NWC absorbed the XY Company and Fort Assiniboine was moved to the Fort La Souris site. In 1801 the NWC built a small post about half a mile upstream.

The HBC established this one in May 1811 on the south side of the river six miles above the mouth of the Souris. Peter Fidler (explorer) was in charge from 1811/1812 to 1819. In May 1816, during the so-called Pemmican War, Cuthbert Grant and his men seized a load of pemmican coming down from Fort Qu'Appelle, Saskatchewan and then plundered Brandon House and took their loot across the river to Fort La Souris. The following year the fort was almost completely destroyed by fire, but Peter Fidler began rebuilding it in 1817. By 1821, there was a cart trail north of the river that was used in preference to canoes. When the two companies merged in 1821 Brandon House was moved across the river to Fort La Souris. In 1824, it was closed as part of George Simpson's attempt to consolidate posts.

In 1811, the NWC closed Fort des Épinettes and built a second Fort La Souris 200 yards from Brandon House#2. In June 1814, during the so-called Pemmican Wars, Miles Macdonell sent a group of men from the Red River Colony and seized some thirty tons of pemmican and other food at Fort La Souris. Some was taken to Brandon House but most was sent downriver to the River settlements. In 1821, the two companies merged and Brandon House was moved to the Fort La Souris site.

Brandon House was re-established in 1828 to prevent the Indians from taking their trade to Pembina, North Dakota. The site was 12 miles upriver due to the lack of trees for building at the old site. It was closed when the area became trapped out and because of fear of attack by the Gros Ventres. Fort Ellice replaced it.

== Locations ==
Brandon House was moved four times on the north bank of the Assiniboine River between Brandon, Manitoba, and the mouth of the Souris River, in what is now the Municipality of Glenboro-South Cypress.

A man named Barkley from the United States had a post between the first two locations at an unknown date. The exact locations of these posts do not seem to have been determined.

The first Brandon House was on the north bank of the Assiniboine about two miles above the mouth of the Souris River on the Yellow Quill Trail to Portage la Prairie opposite something called "Five Mile Creek". Kavanagh (1946) has this at 49°40′25″N 99°37′45″W, the XY post at the edge of the woods below the mouth, one post across the river in an obvious clearing and another to the north of the creek in a plowed field.

The second Brandon House was six miles upriver from the Souris on the west bank and the NWC post on a high bank across the river. Kavanagh (1946) has this as 49°42′19″N 99°40′09″W, but he also puts the first Brandon House on the east bank at this location which was probably the NWC post.

The third (or fourth) location is about 15 km northeast of the first, probably near the cairn erected in October 1828 at 49°46′42″N 99°44′46″W by Chief Trader Francis Heron. It was abandoned in 1832.
