= Rocque =

Rocque is a surname. Notable people with the surname include:

- John Rocque (c. 1709 – 1762), English surveyor and cartographer
- Kelsey Rocque (born 1994), Canadian curler
- Marcel Rocque (born 1971), Canadian curler
- Michael Rocque (born 1899), Indian field hockey player
- François de la Rocque (born 1885), French politician and soldier

== See also ==
- Larocque, a surname
- Rocques, a French commune
