= François-Antoine Larocque Sr. =

Canadian politician

François-Antoine Larocque (1753 – October 31, 1792) was a businessman and political figure in Lower Canada. The surname was also spelled La Roque.

He was born at Quebec City in 1753 and moved to L'Assomption with his father around 1768. He entered business as a merchant there, like his father. In 1781, he married Angélique, the daughter of Germain Leroux, a local merchant. He purchased property on the L'Achigan River in 1786. Larocque was elected to the 1st Parliament of Lower Canada for Leinster in 1792.

He died at L'Assomption in 1792 before taking his seat in the assembly.

His brother-in-law, Laurent Leroux, was an important figure in the fur trade and his son, François-Antoine, became involved in that industry. His great-granddaughter Thérèse married Joseph-Aldric Ouimet, a member of the Canadian House of Commons.
