= Fort des Épinettes =

Coordinates: 49.7106°N 99.22243°W

Fort des Épinettes was a trading post or posts on the Assiniboine River from 1768 to 1811. It was also called Pine Fort and is not to be confused with Pine Island Fort. It was the first post on the Assiniboine and was closely associated with Brandon House/Fort Assiniboine/Fort La Souris 18 miles to the west. For background see Assiniboine River fur trade.

1. 1768-1781, Pedlar: Thomas Correy, Forrest Oakes and Charles Boyer independent traders from Montreal established the first Pine Fort probably in 1768. It met resistance from the local Assiniboines who wanted to preserve their middleman status in the trade to the west and south. Following a devastating smallpox epidemic which struck down many of the native people and some of the traders it was abandoned in 1781. One old source says it was called Assiniboine House

2. 1785-1794, NWC: The second post was established by the North West Company about three quarters of a mile upstream. Because it was near the head of easy navigation and in the buffalo country which provided pemmican it became a major depot for the trade in the Assiniboine area. In 1790 Peter Pond noted that there was trade with the Mandans who were twelve days away on horseback. In 1794 it was threatened by a group of 600 Sioux. The master, one of the McKays, bought them off with 200 made beaver worth of trade goods. In 1794 the post was closed in preference to the new NWC post of Fort Assiniboine#1.

3. 1807-1811, NWC: In 1807 Fort Assiniboine#1 was torn down and its parts rafted downriver to the old Fort des Épinettes site. In 1811 it was closed and moved upriver to Fort la Souris#2.

== Location ==
It was located on a horseshoe bend of the Assiniboine, east of the mouth of Épinette Creek, on a high level plain 75 feet above the river. There was a good supply of birchbark and watap for canoe-building but few large trees for construction. Archaeological work was done in 1971-74. It was on an oxbow lake that was cut off in 1979. In 1890 Joseph Tyrrell found that much of the first fort downstream had been washed away by the river. This is in Spruce Woods Provincial Park. The Manitoba Historical Society article (references) puts it about a mile northwest of where Manitoba Highway 5 crosses the river.
