= Assiniboine River fur trade =

Historic fur trading in Western Canada

Fur trading on the Assiniboine River and the general area west of Lake Winnipeg, in what is now Manitoba, Canada, began as early as 1731.

== Geography ==
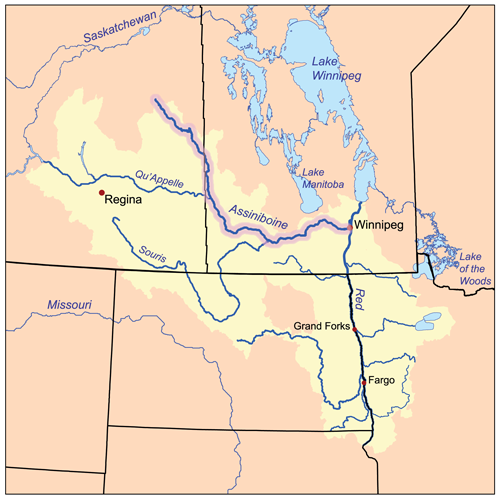
Assiniboine River

Lake Winnipeg was a major junction for the fur trade routes. See Canadian canoe routes (early). To the southeast the route ran to Grand Portage and the French center at Montreal. To the northeast the Hayes River led to the English base on Hudson Bay. To the northwest the Saskatchewan River led west to the Rocky Mountains. From this river another route led northwest to the even richer Athabasca Country.

West of Lake Winnipeg is the chain of lakes that look like a single lake on large maps (Cedar Lake (Manitoba), Lake Winnipegosis and Lake Manitoba). West of this is the Assiniboine River. The Assiniboine flows southeast and then the east to Winnipeg, Manitoba where it meets the Red River of the North which flows north into Lake Winnipeg. Further west the Qu'Appelle River flows east to meet the Assiniboine. South of the Qu'Appelle is the Souris River which was not important in the fur trade. East of the upper Assiniboine the Swan River almost reaches the Assiniboine and flows into Lake Winnipegosis. To the southwest is the Mandan country on the upper Missouri. There was some overland trade with the Mandans until the Americans took it over around 1812. North of Lake Winnipeg is the so-called Muskrat Country which was of some importance around 1800.

The Assiniboine is mostly a prairie river and was not a good source of beaver. It mainly produced buffalo pemmican to feed the voyageurs further north. Because much of the Assiniboine is shallow and crooked, horses, dog sleds and later carts were used in addition to canoes. Most of the beaver came from the forests on the upper Assiniboine. This area was most easily reached via the Swan River from Lake Winnipegosis.

== History ==
=== French Period ===
In 1691 Henry Kelsey reached the upper Assiniboine from Hudson Bay. In 1731, La Vérendrye began pushing French trade and exploration west from Lake Superior. He built Fort Maurepas (Canada) at the mouth of the Red River (1734), Fort Rouge (1738) at Winnipeg and Fort La Reine (1738) on the Assiniboine south of Lake Manitoba. Explorers were sent to the Mandan country and as far as Wyoming. When it became apparent the Assiniboine was not a route to the Pacific attention shifted north to the Saskatchewan River (Fort de la Corne, 1753). The French diverted much trade away from Hudson Bay to Montreal. The English responded by sending agents inland. In 1756-58 Joseph Smith and Joseph Waggoner made two trips to the Swan River and upper Assiniboine.

=== English Period ===
The western fur trade collapsed during the British conquest of Canada but it was soon restored by English-speakers. These so-called "Pedlars" joined together to form the North West Company. The Hudson's Bay Company responded by building posts inland, starting with Cumberland House, Saskatchewan in 1774. Competition between the HBC and NWC led to a great expansion to trade and exploration until the merger of the two companies in 1821. Pedlars reached Lake Winnipeg by 1767 and Fort des Épinettes west of Lake Manitoba in 1768. By the 1770s they were on the lower Saskatchewan River. The NWC reached the Swan River in 1787 and in the 1790s many posts were built on the upper Assiniboine. In 1787 the NWC built Fort Espérance on the Qu'Appelle River. In the 1790s Brandon House and Fort Montagne à la Bosse were built on the middle Assiniboine and there was trade from this area with the Mandans. In 1805 there was communication between the Assiniboine posts and the Lewis and Clark Expedition. In 1811 the Red River Colony was founded which led to open violence culminating in the Battle of Seven Oaks in 1816. After 1821, when the two companies merged, the upper Assiniboine posts were closed and trade concentrated at Fort Pelly at the Swan River portage. In 1831 Fort Ellice was built at the mouth of the Qu'Appelle River and later became more important that Fort Pelly. The Carlton Trail gradually evolved as an overland route west from Winnipeg. By around 1870 St. Paul, Minnesota had a population of 120,000 while there were 11,963 inhabitants on Manitoba. There was a 450-mile cart trail from St. Paul to Winnipeg. Railroads and settlers arrived in the 1880s.

== List of trading posts ==
Posts on the Assiniboine and lower Red River Distances are approximate straight-line distances from the previous entry.

distance	post	years	owner	notes
0	Fort Maurepas	1734-39	French	mouth of the Red River at Lake Winnipeg
32kmS	Lower Fort Garry	1830-1911	HBC	
32kmSSW	Fort Rouge	1738-49	French	Assiniboine joins the Red River
0	Fort Gibraltar	1809-21	NWC	
0	Fort Douglas	1809-12	HBC	
0	Upper Fort Garry	1832-1989	HBC	becomes Winnipeg city
80kmW	Fort La Reine	1738-?	French	portage north to Lake Manitoba
75kmWSW	Fort des Épinettes	1768-1811	NWC	also "Pine Fort"
35kmWNW	Brandon House	1793-1824	HBC, NWC	mouth of the Souris River; "Fort Assiniboine", "Fort la Souris"
80kmW	Fort Montagne à la Bosse	1790-1805	NWC	river turns east
75kmNNW	Fort Ellice	1831-99	HBC	mouth of Qu'Appelle River
110kmN	Fort de la Rivière Tremblante	1791-98	NWC	"Aspin House","Grant's House"
50kmN	Fort Pelly	1824-1924	HBC	portage east to Swan River
c40kwNW	Upper Assiniboine posts	1793-1821	NWC, HBC	See Upper Assiniboine and Swan River below

Assiniboine River trading posts
Yellow=French foundation;
Blue=not on Red/Assiniboine Rivers
- Assiniboine River: minor or ill-documented posts
  - Adhemar's Fort 6 miles east of Portage la Prairie
  - Blondeau's Fort perhaps east of Adhemar's
  - Fort des Trembles or Poplar Fort 5 (or 9) miles west of Portage la Prairie. In 1781 it was defended against Indian attack and them abandoned. This is different from Fort aux Trembles near Fort la Corne.
  - Beaver Creek House somewhere near mouth of the Qu'Appelle. Fort Ellice was on a "Beaver Creek"
  - Shell River posts. About 25 km southeast of Aspin house above the mouth of the Shell River were Pedlar (Peter Grant), NWC and HBC posts. The HBC post was abandoned in 1796.
  - Fort Hibernia at the later site of Fort Pelly
  - Upper Assiniboine posts: (HBC:Swan River House, Marlboro House, Somerset House, Carlton House, Albany House; NWC: Swan River Fort, Bird Mountain House, Fort Alexandria) see section below.
- Red River (other):
  - HBC post in 1819 two or three miles up Netley Creek near the old Fort Maurepas at the mouth of the Red River
  - Pembina, North Dakota
  - Fort Daer: at Pembina built by people from the Red River Colony.
- Souris River: Ash Fort near Hartney, Manitoba, passed by David Thompson in 1798 and Alexander Henry the younger in 1806.
- Qu'Appelle River: Fort Esperance, Fort Qu'Appelle, Saskatchewan
- West: Touchwood Hills Post, Last Mountain House, An American post near Turtle Mountain circa 1832
- North: Fort Red Deer River

== Upper Assiniboine and Swan River fur trade ==
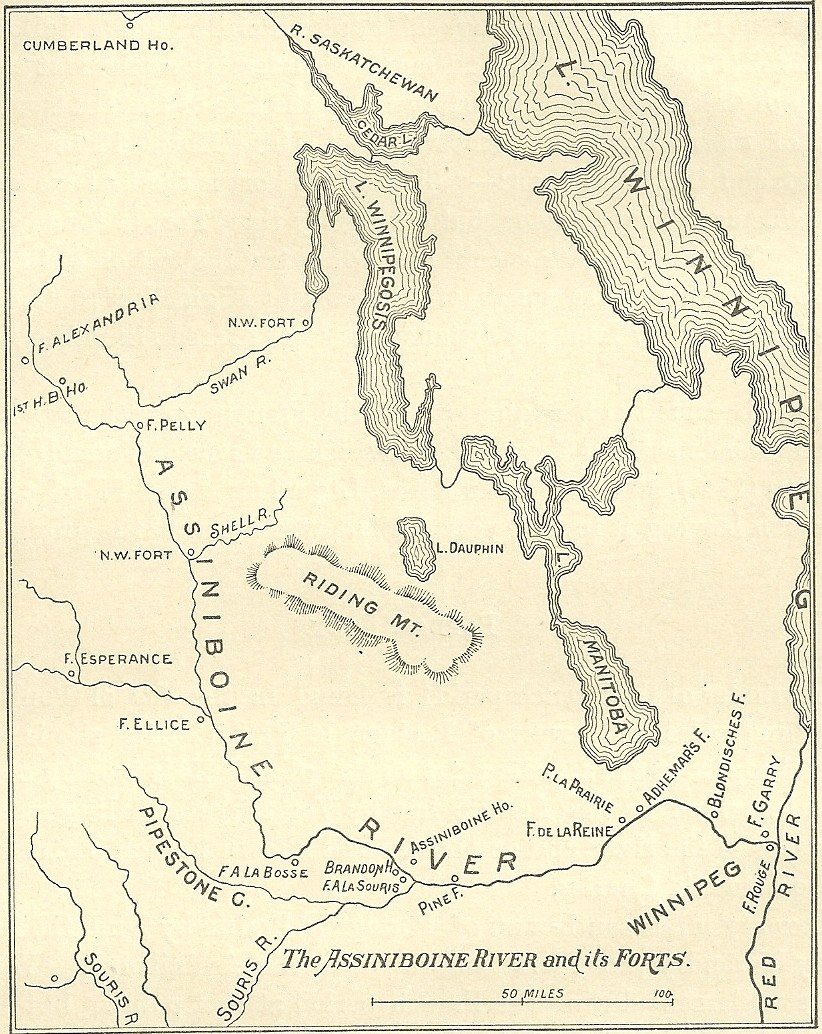
Assiniboine River Trading Posts

From before 1787 until 1821 there were a number of trading posts on the upper Assiniboine and Swan River. Either they are ill-documented or the documents have not been studied, so there is little information and locations are uncertain. Because the upper Assiniboine is shallow, twisting and full of sand bars the area was usually reached via the Swan River. The route ran from Lake Winnipegosis up the short Shoal River to Swan Lake, up the Swan River to its bend and over an easy portage to the Assiniboine near the later Fort Pelly. Because the area was much closer to Hudson Bay than Montreal the Hudson's Bay Company had a significant advantage over the North West Company.

The first in the area was William Bruce, an independent trader from Montreal. He established an unnamed post in the Shoal River at an uncertain date. In 1787 Robert Grant of the North West Company built Swan River Fort (NWC,1787-?) on the north bank of the Swan River ten or twelve miles above Swan Lake. In 1790 Charles Isham of the Hudson's Bay Company built Swan River House (HBC,1790-1808) one-half mile above the NWC post. About 1793 the NWC built a post between the Swan and Assiniboine in response to Marlboro House below.

In 1793 Isham built Marlboro House (HBC,1793-?) on the Assiniboine near its "elbow" which is near the Swan River portage and the later Fort Pelly. In 1793 Cuthbert Grant of the NWC built Bird Mountain House (NWC,1793-?) 50 miles upstream at the mouth of Thunder Creek. In 1794 Isham built Somerset House (HBC, 1794-1808) two miles above Grant's post. This was in an area used as a wintering place by buffalo and was so successful that it reduced Swan River House to an outpost. In 1795 the NWC built posts immediately next to Swan River House and Somerset House (Losey does not explain what happened to the NWC posts already nearby.) About the same time Isham and Peter Fidler built a post 15 miles west of the elbow which they called Carlton House (HBC,1795?-?) (not to be confused with Fort Carlton). In 1795 the NWC built Fort Alexandria (NWC 1795-1821), said to be near Sturgis, Saskatchewan. Daniel Williams Harmon was here from 1800 to 1805. It was closed 1805 and re-opened in 1807. John Sutherland built Albany House (HBC,1796-?) after moving up from the Shell River. There were also some "South Men" who came from the area around Duluth, but they are very poorly documented. The area soon became trapped out. The HBC closed Swan River House and Somerset House some time between 1799 and 1807 and briefly reopened them for the 1807-08 season with Peter Fidler in charge. The NWC continued to operate but all the posts were closed in 1821 when the two companies merged. The general area continued to be called "Swan River District" and was administered from Fort Pelly from 1824.
