= Larocque's expedition to Yellowstone River =

Canadian expedition to the Yellowstone River

Canadian fur trader François-Antoine Larocque’s expedition to Yellowstone River in 1805 is the first well-described journey from Upper Missouri River and westward to the Bighorn Mountains and the middle Yellowstone in present-day Montana.

Larocque’s “Yellowstone Journal” provides a picture of the early fur trade with the Mandan and Hidatsa Indians in North Dakota. As he traveled with a Crow Indian camp on its way back home to the Yellowstone, Larocque described the various countrysides from the Hidatsa village Big Hidatsa at Knife River, upstream Powder River and along the Bighorn Mountains. During the 2½ months long journey, he and the Crows made camps in the modern states of North Dakota, Wyoming and Montana. Probably, Larocque’s detailed record gives “a better understanding of the day-to-day rhythm of camp movement and the factors conditioning this movement than any other known document …” on a typical plains people. It also adds to the history and ethnography of the Crows.

== François-Antoine Larocque ==
Born in Quebec, François-Antoine Larocque (1784–1869) learned English in the United States from boyhood. His “Yellowstone Journal” was most likely written in that language. The original is lost, but a copy is in the Baby Collection of the Archives Department, University of Montreal. In 1801, Larocque entered the Canadian fur trade. First employed at the XY Company, he worked for the North West Company at the time of his expedition.

Charles Jean Baptiste Chaboillez was then in charge of the company’s Assiniboine River branch. Instead of waiting for some Indians to arrive with furs at Fort Montagne à la Bosse in Manitoba, employees went on planned trading expeditions with goods to the distant village Indians on the Upper Missouri in North Dakota.

== The start ==
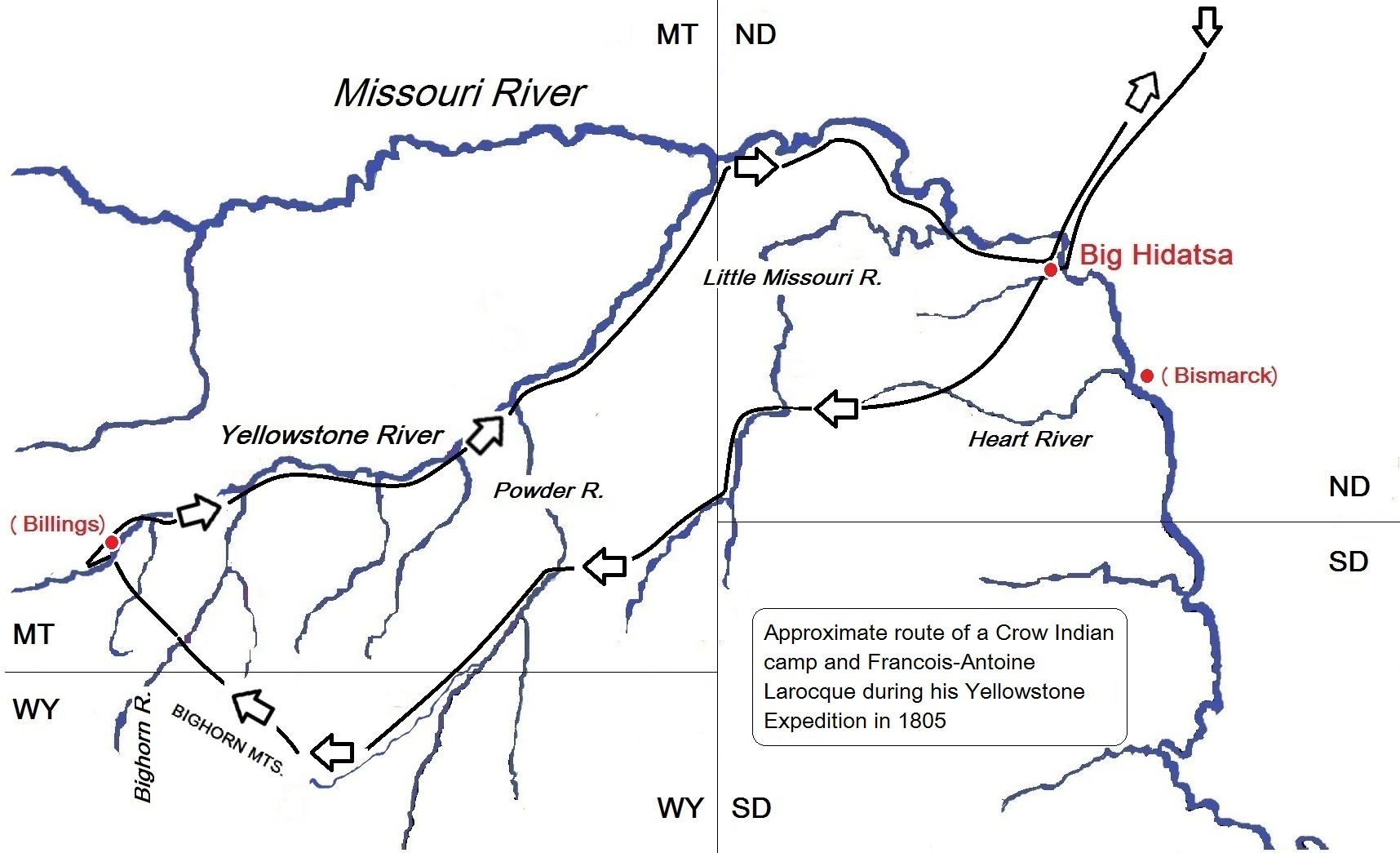
Map with the route of a Crow Indian camp and Francois-Antoine Larocque in 1805. During the travel, they made camp in present-day North Dakota, Wyoming and Montana

With orders from Chaboillez to examine the potentials of a future trade with the relatively unknown “Rocky Mountains Indians” (the Crows), Larocque and some companions left Fort Montagne à la Bosse in the summer of 1805. Larocque envisioned the hazards of the expedition and feared for his life. On June 12, the group arrived at the Native trading center formed by the corn growing village Indians of the Upper Missouri. The Mandan Indians lived just south of the Hidatsas. The latter share a common origin with the Crows.

Disliking opposition, most Hidatsas tried to scare Larocque from joining a trading Crow camp on its homeward journey by talks of Crow treachery. Unwavering and reassured by Hidatsa chief Le Borgne (One Eye), Larocque exchanged gifts of friendship with the Crow leaders on June 27. The head chief was Red Calf. Two days later, Larocque and his companions, William Morrison and a man with the surname of Souci, went to the Crow camp. The Indians “threw down their tents” and the entire group went eight miles up the Knife and made camp for the night. The Crows were retracing their steps loaded with 200 guns with balls and powder, lots of corn as well as axes, kettles and other items acquired from the Hidatsas for 250 horses, many buffalo robes and skin clothes.

== The journey to Little Missouri River ==
The next days the camp, with 645 Crow warriors from different bands and joined by a Shoshone camp of 20 tipis, moved southwest heading for Heart River. Start was around 8 or 9 o’clock in the morning. Four or five hours later, the Indians made a new camp. The fur traders lived in the tipi of an attentive Crow family. After an attempt of theft of a gun, the camp chief arranged for two night guards outside the tipi. On July 2, a number of lodges collapsed in a shower of large hails. Crossing Heart River, the camp moved towards Little Missouri River. A false alarm of enemies stopped the advance of the camp once.

Young men went hunting when possible. With buffalo close to the moving camp, guards checked the people until the hunters were off. A count of the firearms in camp showed 204 guns. One night, a hurricane threw down many of the more than 300 tipis in camp. On July 10, the camp dried meat and a deceased woman was laid to rest before a much later than usual camp movement in the afternoon. Three days later, the camp crossed the Little Missouri.

== The journey to Powder River ==
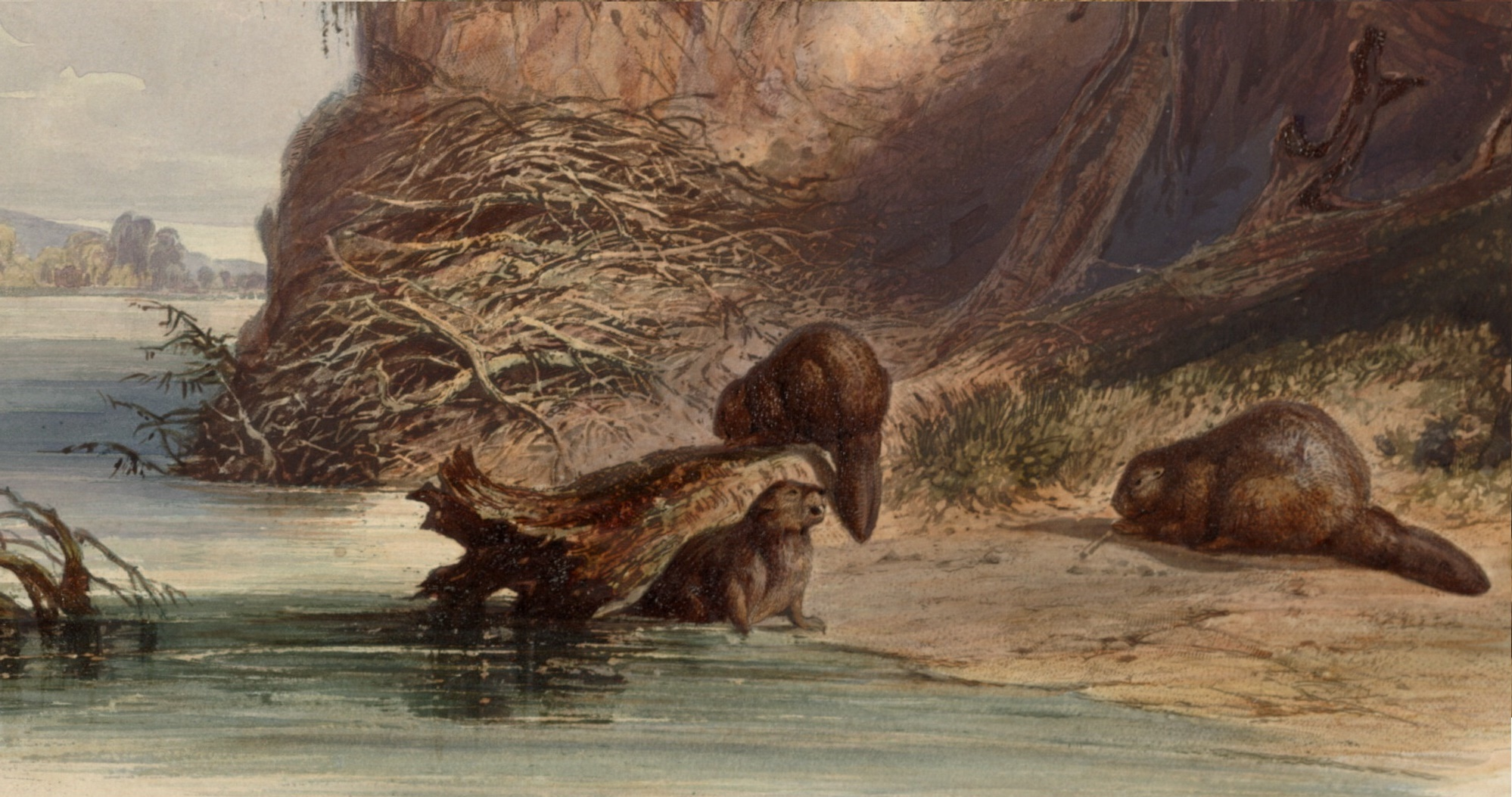
Detail of Beaver Hut on the Missouri painted by Karl Bodmer. Larocque were ordered to the Yellowstone area to get first-hand knowledge of the number of beavers and to incite the local Crow Indians to hunt them

The Indians killed some beavers on the way upstream the Little Missouri. They learned how to dress them to meet the standard of the fur company. On July 18, Larocque hunted buffalo with the camp chief, while the main body moved 15 miles upstream. The camp started westward, left the river and put up the tipis on a tributary. Larocque being sick, the camp remained at this place for two days. The tipis were finally pitched on the banks of the silt-filled Powder River on July 27. Larocque noted a rich wildlife in form of beaver, buffalo, elk, pronghorn and bear.

== The journey to the Bighorn Mountains ==
Prickly pears had covered much of the ground between the Little Missouri and the Powder, so the camp stayed for a day to let the horses feed on grass. The women dried and dressed skins. Larocque went hunting with the Indians during a camp move and saw the first bighorns. He described a landscape of high hills. One had many “stones” (selenite gypsum) shining like mirrors. Due to a common buffalo hunt, the camp police halted even Larocque and the chief as they were about to leave the campsite one morning. However, they were permitted to leave unnoticed. The tipi of the chief was the first down in camp and the first up. He was in front of the moving people, except for advanced scouts. Rear guards protected the slow in the group. Larocque had now traveled with the Crows for more than a month.

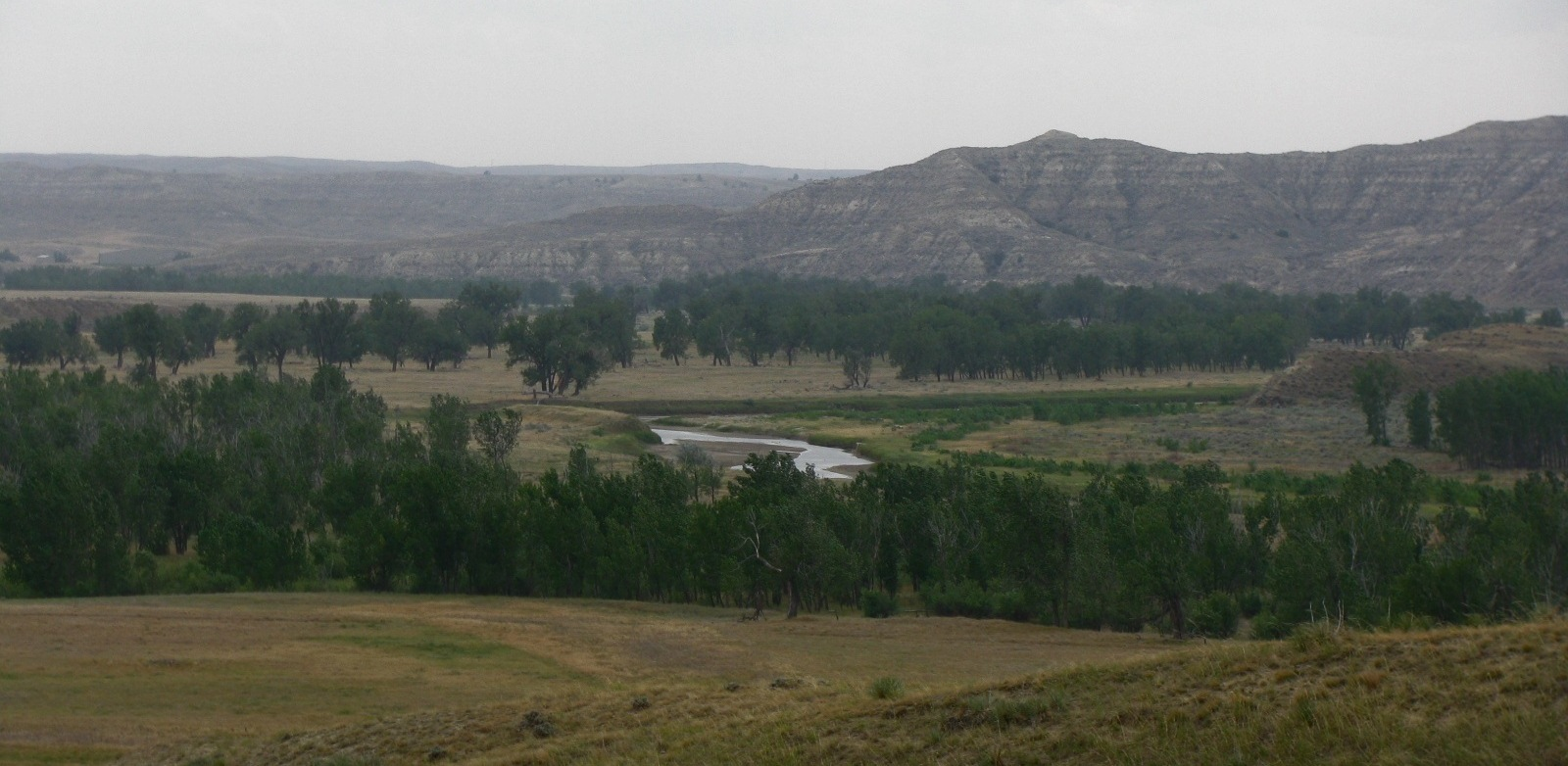
The Powder River in Johnson County, Wyoming. Larocque and the Crows followed Powder River upstream for many days

The first of August came with thunder and rain. The weather thwarted every plan of a camp move. Powder River rose six inches. The already sandy and thick water became mud. While camping along the Powder, the Crows dug holes in the shore and used the filtered water there. An unseen enemy fired at some children a night. Guards were on the alert until morning. On August 4, Larocque finally studied the Bighorn Mountains through his spyglass. Except for Indians, only the free fur trader Ménard had seen the range around 1800 for sure. The 1743 journal of the La Vérendrye brothers’ expedition is too vague to tell if they saw the Bighorn Mountains or just reached the Black Hills, South Dakota.

A woman received a serious shot wound on August 6, inflicted by a man (not her husband) in jealousy. Impatiently, camp members asked Larocque, when he would return to the Hidatsa village. They had expected his goodbye, once he had seen the Bighorn Mountains. Larocque found it hard to make the Crows understand the reasons for his probe into the population of beaver, “for they do not want to understand”.

On August 8, the longest expedition stage of 24 miles took the camp to the foot of the Bighorn Mountains. The men hunted buffalo for tipis. The leaders in camp sent out scouts to determine the best route to the Yellowstone. When asked again, Larocque said he would follow the camp for another 20 to 30 days. He wanted to see the River aux Roches Jaunes (the Yellowstone) and the homeland of the Crows, so he could return with trading items. Then, some Crows painted a rather detailed map of the country on a skin and showed where they usually made camps at different times of the year. The scouts returned on August 12 and brought news of large buffalo herds on Tongue River and Little Bighorn River. A camp crier announced the council’s decision of a camp movement along the range towards the Yellowstone the next day.

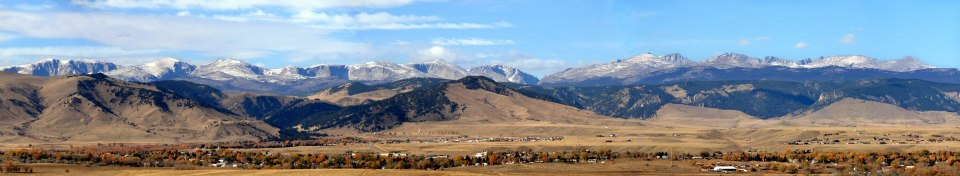
Panorama of Buffalo, Wyoming at the base of the Bighorn Mountains. Before Larocque, the only white man known to have seen Bighorn Mountains was the free fur trader Ménard around 1800. The La Vérendrye brothers may only have seen the Black Hills, South Dakota, in 1743

== The journey along the Bighorn Mountains ==
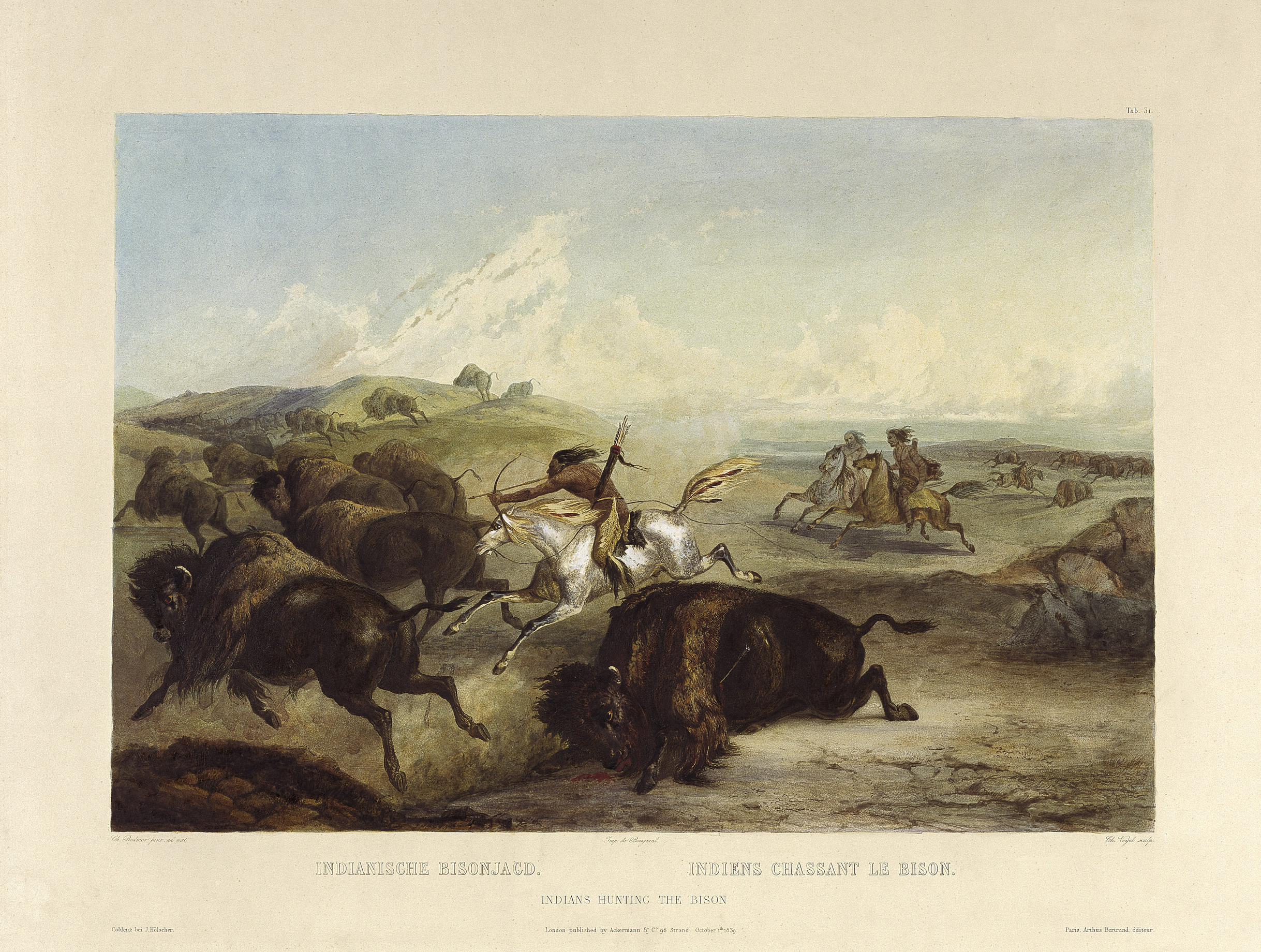
Indians hunting the bison by Karl Bodmer. Some times, Larocque hunted bison with the Crows

People and horses were in danger of falling down steep hills during the first movement along the Bighorn Mountains. As always, the tipis were later pitched close to a stream. One day, Larocque bought a horse for a gun, 200 balls, clothes and blankets, some metal items and other stuff. Wild plum trees and bushes with berries grew everywhere and attracted the bears. Larocque saw nearly the whole camp engage in one of the daily bear hunts. On August 18, the moving camp paused for some hours to let the men hunt at Little Bighorn River. It crossed that river before selecting a place for the night.

Confusion ruled in camp the next morning. The wife of the trail chief, Spotted Crow, had deserted him for a lover. He wanted to follow her, while other bandleaders favored the already chosen route. “Horses have been killed and women wounded” due to jealousy. A Shoshone in camp shot his wife dead, when he found her with another man for the third time.

The shortest camp movement of only three miles brought the travelling Indians to a scenic spot with fine grass for the horse herds. The camp stayed a day, so the people could utilize the hard ash wood found just here. Nearly everyone carved horsewhip handles and other wooden objects. Spotted Crow stepped down as trail chief the following day. Another man of age replaced him and assured Larocque, they would continue to the Yellowstone as planned.

== Enemies ==
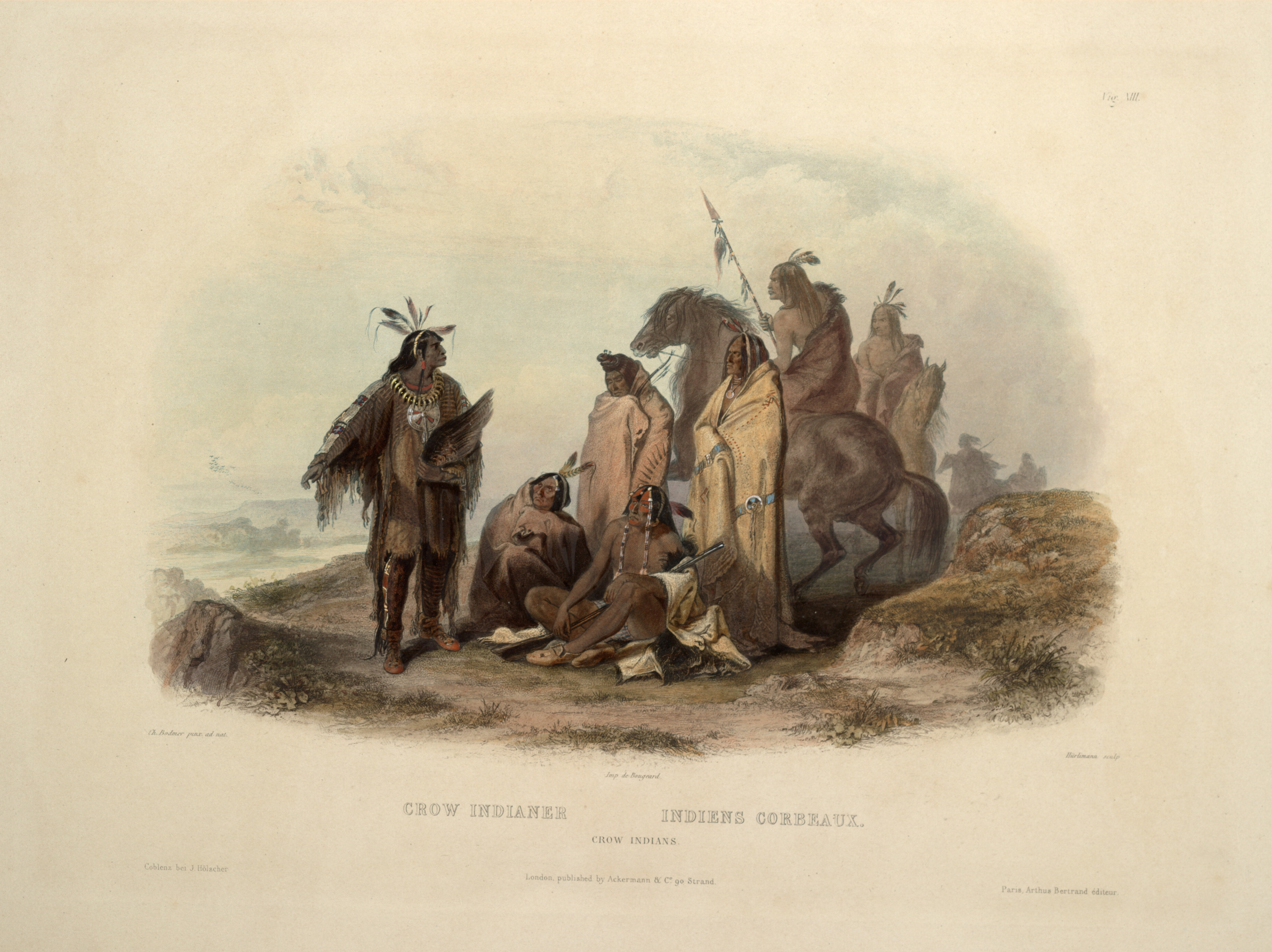
Crow Indians. Larocque traveled with a Crow camp for more than two months during his Yellowstone journey. The discovery of a war group of Assiniboine Indians near Bighorn River stirred the Crow camp one morning.

A general alarm stirred the camp the next morning, August 24. The sound of two shots had come from a place near Bighorn River, and the camp guards had noticed a few running buffalo. Further, they reported three unknown Indians on a hill near Bighorn Mountains. Thirty mounted warriors left camp right away, while other men prepared to follow if needed. Two or three hours later, a messenger came back with news of 35 foot warriors moving away along a tributary to the Bighorn. Except for the aged and the feeble, all in camp took up the pursued on horseback. Larocque followed.

The large body of warriors, women and children assembled on a hill. A leader of one of the warrior societies took the lead with a group of men. Meanwhile, a crier encouraged and inspired the rest of the people. All were dressed up. Wives carried the arms of their husband and followed him. Scouts on distant hilltops signaled with skins which route to ride. Other leaders came up to the waiting crowd and all went after the foes.

The Crows overtook two enemy scouts after a long pursued. They were identified as Assiniboine Indians. When Larocque arrived, both had been killed and scalped. The bodies were mutilated. A shocked Larocque saw the victors bring cut off trophies back to camp. That night and the next day, the camp celebrated the triumph over their enemies. Warriors with black painted face sang to the beat of a drum. Thirty women danced while they carried their husband’s weapons and displayed the two scalps. With intervals, the camp would do the victory dance three more times.

== The journey to Yellowstone River ==
Rain delayed the camp movement until noon on August 26. Larocque noted many beaver dams near the new campsite. Scouts tried to locate the rest of the Assiniboine war party. Someone had found a clear trail of many peoples near the Bighorn River, and the camp feared a large-scale attack. Guards were up all night. Before daylight all prepared for a battle, which never occurred. The next day, hunters reported unknown Indians far away. The Crow tipis were pitched near the mouth of the Bighorn Canyon.

On September 1, the camp made a short movement to the next site. A Shoshone arrived in camp with a bridle and other trade goods of Spanish make. The first signs of autumn appeared.

With the tipis put up at “Shot Stone River” (Pryor Creek), the hunters went for buffalo. (The Crows shot arrows into the high openings of Arrow Rock near the river as an offering and hence the name of this tributary to the Yellowstone.) The women dried buffalo tongues and dressed skins for an important but not specified ceremony. The noticed signs of strangers in the area proved to come from a big camp of Gros Ventre Indians (Atsina). They hoped to establish contact, but no one dared visit the Crow camp. The Crows and Larocque stood on the banks of the Yellowstone on September 10. They pitched the tipis on a large island in the river. The next day, five Gros Ventres entered the lodge of the camp chief, where Larocque now stayed. They wanted to trade for horses. The camp moved nine miles up the Yellowstone to a place, where the Crows used to make “their fall medicines”. (This may hint to the Sun Dance, although not a yearly ceremony among the Crows).

The camp had accomplished 47 movements since the start on June 29.

== The way back to Big Hidatsa village ==
Larocque and his fellow fur traders were ready to leave on September 14. He urged the Crows to hunt beavers. He promised to come back with goods next fall then. By the signal of four fires lit on a Pryor Mountains top on four successive days, he would announce his return to the Crow country. The Crows responded they usually spent the winter in a nearby mountain valley. The Yellowstone area was a favorite during spring and fall, while they camped near Tongue River and an unidentified “Horse River” in the summer.

Two chiefs escorted the leaving party eight miles up the Yellowstone on the north bank. The men continued 20 miles. Next morning, they crossed to the other side of the river. They waded Pryor Creek at the confluence with the Yellowstone. They found a rock with a battle between three horsemen and three pedestrians painted in red. The area was alive with buffalo and elk. The party made camp at Tongue River on September 21. Two days later, it crossed the Powder. Unable to find any grass, the men had to give the horses bark of cottonwood. Once, they went through heavy smoke from a plains fire. It became necessary to shoe the horses with rawhide due to the constant travelling. Sometimes the men did more than 35 miles a day. They reached the Missouri on the last day of September. Larocque discovered a fortified earth lodge, likely made by either the Mandan or the Hidatsa. A corral adjoined the palisade. Inside he found many buffalo skulls, a number of them painted red.

On October 9, the party reached a camp of Hidatsas a little upstream from their village. Since Larocque’s departure, some Sioux Indians had killed three Hidatsas. The men crossed the Missouri. Here they came across three Assiniboine couples heading for the Hidatsa villages to trade. Winter was approaching. The men reached Fort Montagne à la Bosse on October 18. Larocque arrived with 122 beaver skins, four bear skins and two otter skins, a Crow bow of horn, a part of a tipi and a few other items.

== About the Crows ==
Larocque shared some of his knowledge about his Crow hosts gained during the Yellowstone expedition.

He noted three divisions of Crows split up into smaller bands and camps. Smallpox had cut their numbers from 2,000 tipis to 300 around 1802. When game was abundant, the Crows made big camps for common protection. The Crows obtained many horses from the Flathead Indians further west and exchanged them later with profit to the Mandans and the Hidatsas for kettles, guns and products of the garden. It was uncommon to see a Crow family with less than 10 horses and many had 30 or more. Due to the general wealth in horses, the Crows were able to transport cripples and people of old age from camp to camp, unlike some other Natives. Overall, Larocque considered the Crows a healthy people. The Crows enjoyed good company. Larocque commented on the proper ritual to perform before smoking a pipe and about the etiquette while smoking. He made a short list of words to show the similarities between the languages of the Crow and the related Hidatsa. He included some information obtained about the Flathead and the Shoshone Indians further west.

== Later ==
Larocque was unable to keep his promise to the Crows the next year. He never returned to their homeland.

The next whites passing through the heart of the Crow country were members of the Lewis and Clark Expedition during the summer of 1806. The first trading post in Crow country was Fort Raymond (also known as Fort Lisa) built on the banks of Yellowstone River near the mouth of Bighorn River in 1807.

== Gallery ==
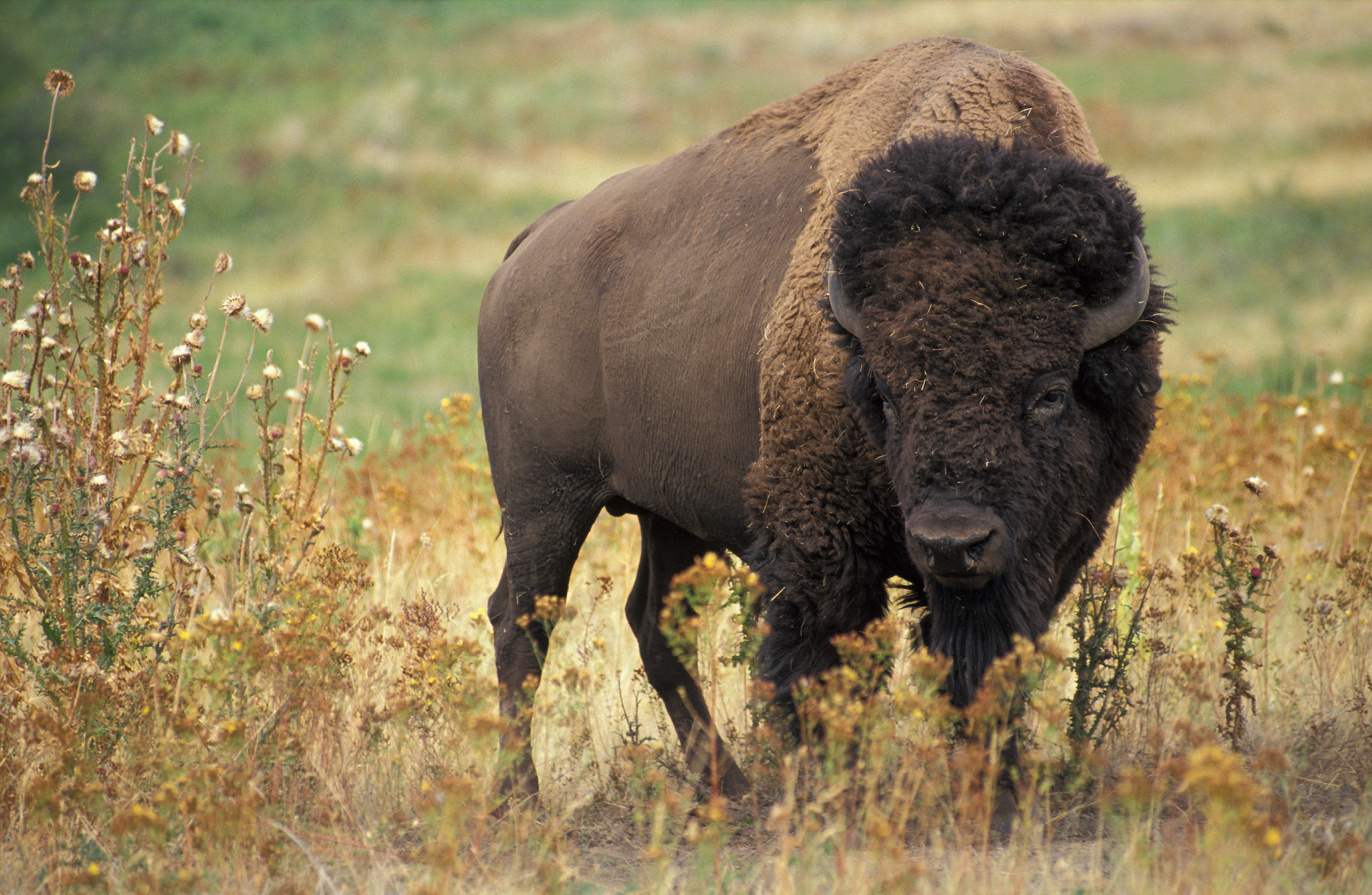
American bison

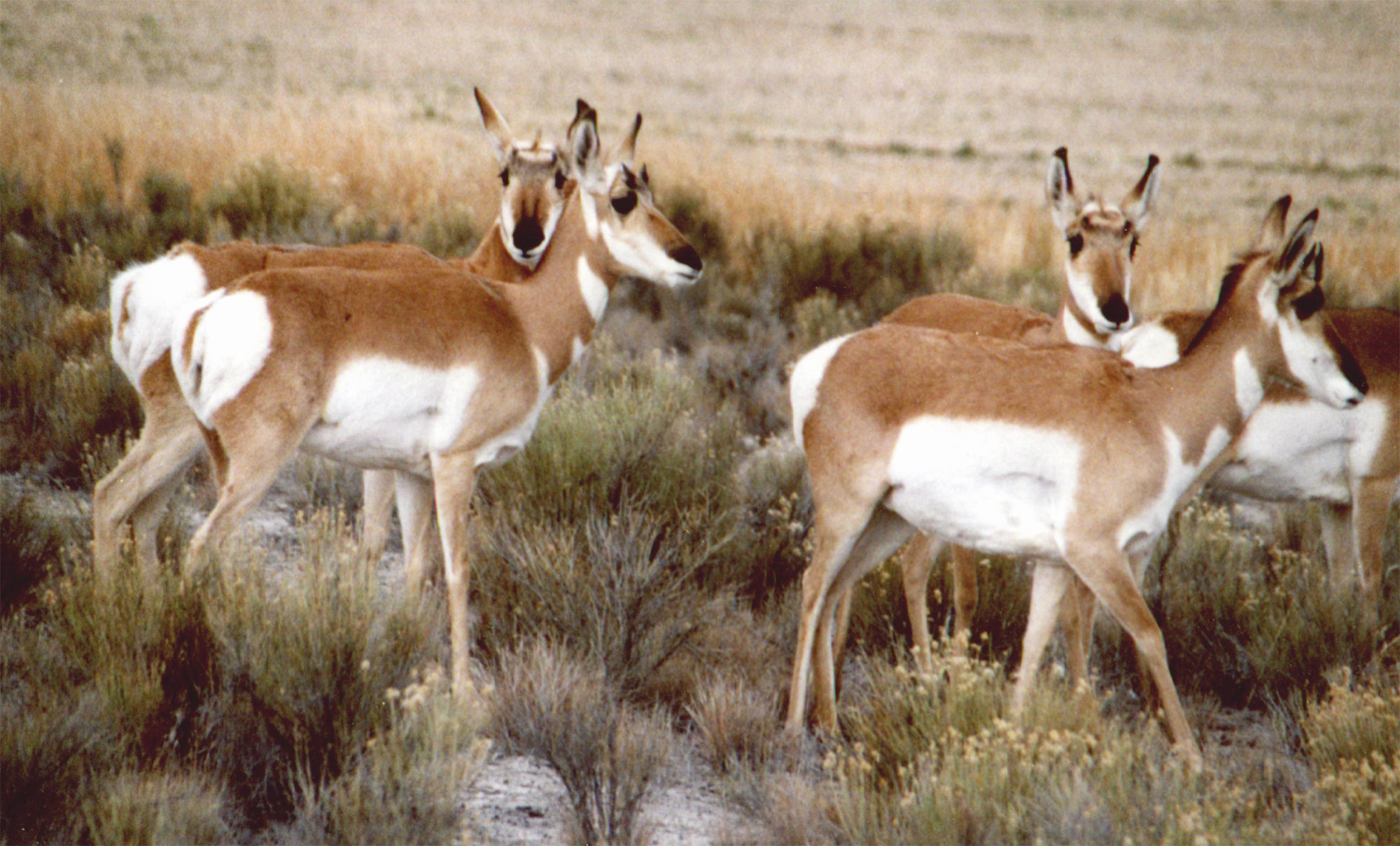
Antelope or pronghorn

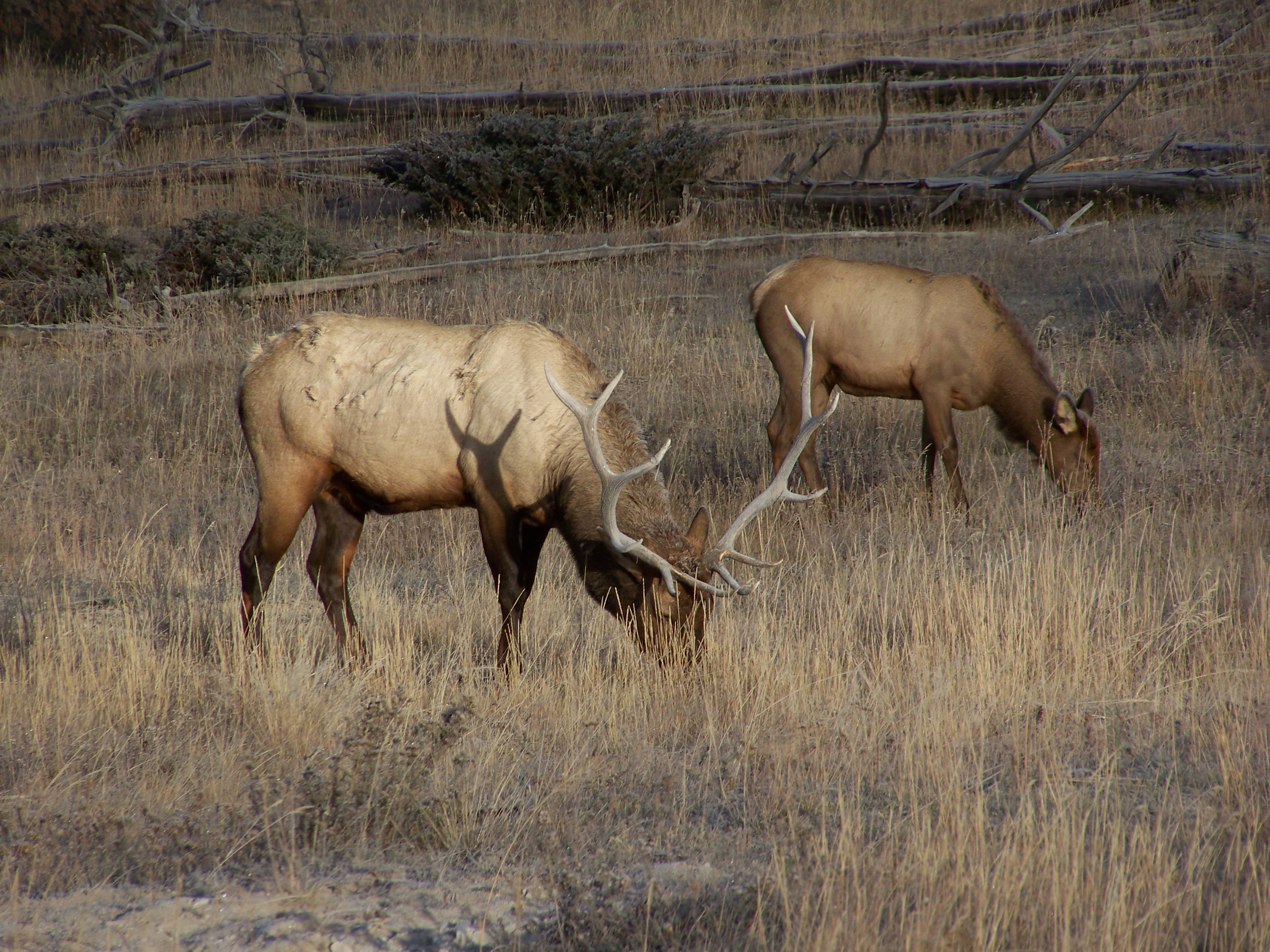
Grazing Elk in Yellowstone National Park

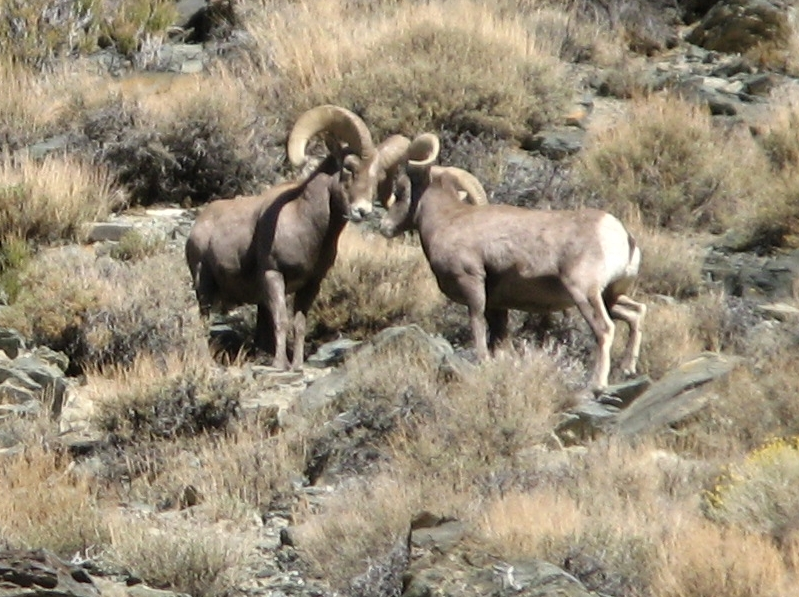
Butt heads. Larocque saw the first Bighorn sheep west of the Powder

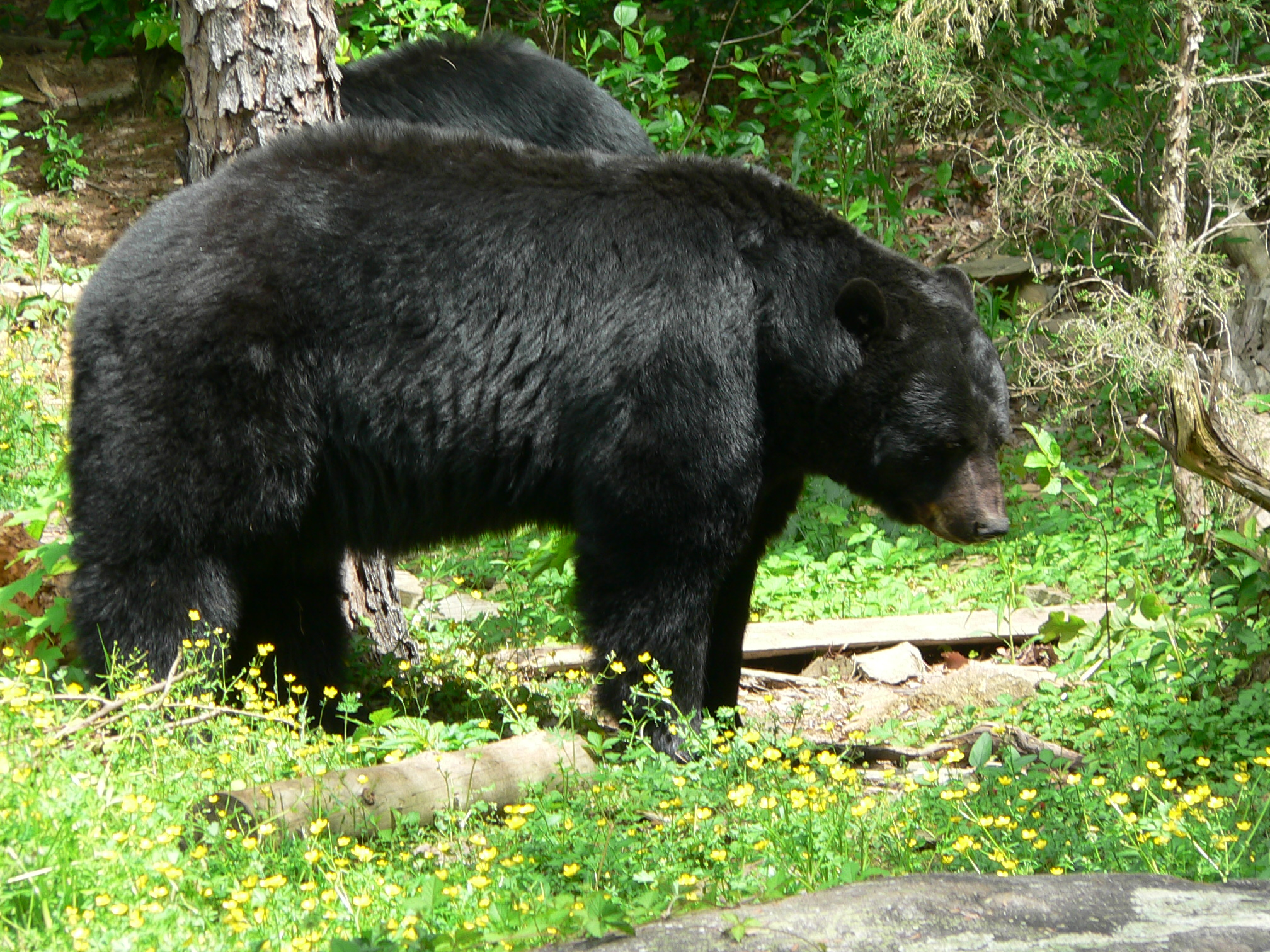
Blacky. The Crows hunted bears encountered on the route to the Yellowstone
