= Laurent Leroux =

Fur trader, businessman and politician in Lower Canada

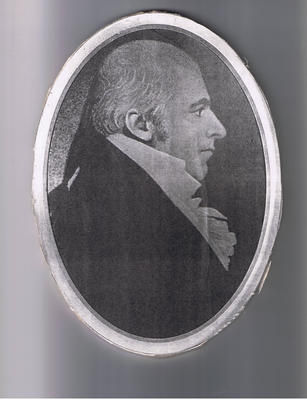
Laurent Leroux (1759-1855)

Laurent Leroux (November 17, 1759 – May 26, 1855) was a fur trader, businessman and political figure in Lower Canada.

He was born in L'Assomption in 1759, the son of Germain Le Roux d’Esneval, whose family lived at the Château d'Esneval. His father grew up in Paris and settled in New France after the serving as in officer in the War of the Austrian Succession, afterwards becoming a merchant. In 1776, Leroux was hired as a clerk by a Montreal merchant and sent to Michilimackinac. He became a clerk in a fur trading company there, Gregory, MacLeod and Company, that competed with the North West Company. In 1786, he set up a trading post on Great Slave Lake. After the murder of Leroux's superior, John Ross, Gregory, MacLeod and Company merged with the North West Company. He travelled with Alexander MacKenzie to Great Slave Lake in 1789 and again met Mackenzie, returning from the Arctic Ocean, later that year. When Laurent's father died in 1792, he returned to L'Assomption to take over his father's business there, although he still retained links to the North West Company. He expanded into the production of potash and also sold products manufactured by the Batiscan ironworks. He helped found the Bank of Montreal. Leroux was named a justice of the peace. He served in the local militia during the War of 1812 and became major in 1818. In 1827, he was elected to the Legislative Assembly of Lower Canada for Leinster.

He died at L'Assomption in 1855. His nephews, François-Antoine and Joseph, also became involved in fur trading, using their uncle's connections in the industry. His sister, Angélique, married Jean-Moïse Raymond, who also represented Leinster in the legislative assembly, before marrying the eldest son of Captain John Munro.
