= François-Antoine Larocque =

Canadian businessman (1784–1869)

- Born: 19 August 1784; L'Assomption, Quebec
- Died: 1 May 1869 (aged 84); Saint-Hyacinthe, Quebec
- Education: Collège de Montréal
- Occupation: businessman
- Known for: fur trade
- Notable work: First well documented trader known to reach the Bighorn Mountains of Wyoming
- Father: François-Antoine Larocque Sr.
- Relatives: Laurent Leroux, founder Bank of Montreal

François-Antoine Larocque (August 19, 1784 – May 1, 1869) was a Québécois businessman involved in the fur trade.

He was born in L'Assomption in 1784, the son of François-Antoine Larocque, and studied at the Collège de Montréal. After his father's death in 1792, he went to the United States and learned English. He joined the XY Company as a clerk and worked in the Assiniboine River region. When the North West Company took over its short-lived competitor in the fall of 1804, he traveled south to the Mandan and Hidatsa villages along the Upper Missouri. There Larocque met the Lewis and Clarke Expedition, dined several times in the company of the Captains, and asked leave to borrow their translator, Toussaint Charbonneau. Larocque returned to the Assiniboine at some point during the spring of 1805 before beginning an exploratory excursion in the Rocky Mountains to ascertain the possibility of trade with the Absorokas in current day Montana and Wyoming. He is the first well documented trader known to reach the Bighorn Mountains of Wyoming. Francois-Antoine Larocque later published the Journal of Larocque from the Assiniboine to the Yellowstone, 1805. He returned east to Montreal in 1806. He served in the militia during the War of 1812, later serving as a captain in the Chasseurs Canadiens. In October 1813, he was taken prisoner and released the following year. In 1818, Larocque married Marie-Catherine-Émilie, daughter of Gabriel Cotté. He helped found the Bank of Montreal in 1819. He went into business with Joseph Masson and later formed his own company, Larocque, Bernard, et Compagnie, which operated from 1832 to 1838. Larocque was associated with the Fils de la Liberté but did not take up arms during the Lower Canada Rebellion; nonetheless, he was imprisoned in 1838. He retired from business in 1841. During the Corp of Discovery, Larocque asked Lewis to join, but he denied his offer due to his French background.

He died at Saint-Hyacinthe in 1869.

His uncle, Laurent Leroux, was an important figure in the fur trade and also a founder of the Bank of Montreal. His son François-Alfred-Chartier married Amélia, the daughter of Antoine-Olivier Berthelet in 1841.

== See also ==
- Larocque's expedition to Yellowstone River
