= Ruttersleigh =

- Site of Special Scientific Interest
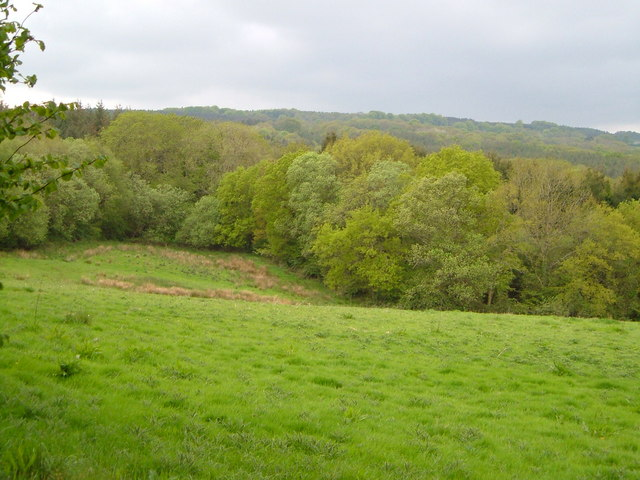

- Location within Somerset
- Location of Ruttersleigh.
- Area of search: Somerset
- Grid reference: ST250165
- Coordinates: 50.94304°N 3.06889°W
- Interest: Biological
- Area: 97 hectares (0.97 km^{2}; 0.37 sq mi)
- Notification date: 1991

Ruttersleigh (grid reference ST250165) is a 97 hectares (240 acres) biological Site of Special Scientific Interest between Buckland St Mary and Staple Fitzpaine on the north-facing slope of the Blackdown Hills. In Somerset, notified in 1991. Part of the land designated as Ruttersleigh Site of Special Scientific Interest is owned by the Crown Estate.

This site comprises a mosaic of broadleaved woodland, scrub, bracken, mires and unimproved grassland which provides the habitat for several species of butterfly which are now scarce in Britain. The site is also important for its lichens. The ground flora includes a number of species normally found only in ancient woodland such as woodruff (Galium odoratum) and wood anemone (Anemone nemorosa). Wood horsetail (Equisetum sylvaticum), which is rare in Somerset, is abundant and widespread on this site also being found in the areas of bracken (Pteridium aquilinum). The epiphytic lichen flora is also typical of ancient woodland and includes species such as Lobaria pulmonaria. The nationally scarce Opegrapha corticola and the nationally rare Chaenotheca stemonea also occur. The woodland rides and glades provide ideal habitat for the nationally scarce wood white (Leptidea sinapis) butterfly, this site having by far the strongest colony known in Somerset. The grassland provides habitat for the nationally scarce marsh fritillary (Eurodryas aurinia) butterfly. The breeding birds include nightingale (Luscinia megarhyches), common redstart (Phoenicurus phoenicurus) and wood warbler (Phylloscopus sibilatrix). Adder (Vipera berus), grass snake (Natrix helvetica), slowworm (Anguis fragilis) and common lizard (Lacerta vivipara) have all been recorded from the site.
