= Long Lye Meadow =

English nature reserve

- Site of Special Scientific Interest
- Location within Somerset
- Location of Long Lye Meadow.
- Area of search: Somerset
- Grid reference: ST267119
- Coordinates: 50.90190°N 3.04377°W
- Interest: Biological
- Area: 3.3 hectares (0.033 km^{2}; 0.013 sq mi)
- Notification date: 2002

Long Lye Meadow (grid reference ST267119) is a 3.3 hectare biological Site of Special Scientific Interest at Buckland St Mary in the Blackdown Hills, Somerset, notified in 2002.

This site along with the adjoining Long Lye were considered to be under threat from a scheme to widen the A303.

The neutral grassland component varies in character and herb richness. There is a strong population of green-winged orchid (Orchis morio), together with a few plants of common twayblade (Neottia ovata). In a few areas meadow thistle (Cirsium dissectum) occurs.
