= Buckland St Mary =

Village and civil parish in Somerset, England

Coordinates: 50.9141°N 3.0424°W

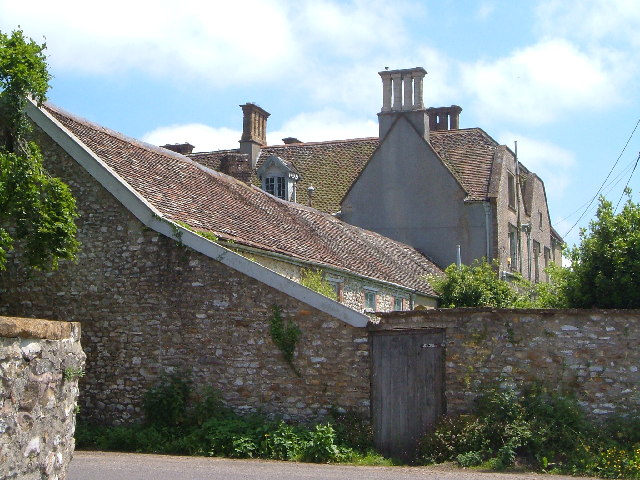
- The Old Rectory, Buckland St Mary

- Location within Somerset
- Population: 521 (2011)
- OS grid reference: ST268132
- Unitary authority: Somerset Council
- Ceremonial county: Somerset
- Region: South West
- Country: England
- Sovereign state: United Kingdom
- Post town: Chard
- Postcode district: TA20
- Dialling code: 01823
- Police: Avon and Somerset
- Fire: Devon and Somerset
- Ambulance: South Western
- UK Parliament: Yeovil

Buckland St Mary is a village and parish in Somerset, England, situated 6 miles (9.7 km) to the west of Ilminster and 8 miles (12.9 km) south of Taunton, close to the A303. The village has a population of 521. The parish is within the Blackdown Hills Area of Outstanding Natural Beauty and includes the hamlet of Birchwood.

== History ==
Nearby is Castle Neroche a Norman motte-and-bailey castle on the site of an earlier hill fort.

The name of the village is thought to mean "land granted by charter" with the addition of the church's dedication.

Buckland was part of the hundred of Abdick and Bulstone.

The village was chosen as Village of the Year for Somerset in the Calor 2008 competition.

== Governance ==
The parish council has responsibility for local issues, including setting an annual precept (local rate) to cover the council's operating costs and producing annual accounts for public scrutiny. The parish council evaluates local planning applications and works with the local police, district council officers, and neighbourhood watch groups on matters of crime, security, and traffic. The parish council's role also includes initiating projects for the maintenance and repair of parish facilities, as well as consulting with the district council on the maintenance, repair, and improvement of highways, drainage, footpaths, public transport, and street cleaning. Conservation matters (including trees and listed buildings) and environmental issues are also the responsibility of the council.

For local government purposes, since 1 April 2023, the parish comes under the unitary authority of Somerset Council. Prior to this, it was part of the non-metropolitan district of South Somerset (established under the Local Government Act 1972). It was part of Chard Rural District before 1974.

It is also part of the Yeovil county constituency represented in the House of Commons of the Parliament of the United Kingdom. It elects one Member of Parliament (MP) by the first past the post system of election.

== Geography ==
Long Lye, Deadman, Ruttersleigh and Long Lye Meadow have all been designated as biological Sites of Special Scientific Interest.

== School ==
The school was built in 1851 and enlarged in 1883. The boundary wall incorporates a wellhouse with a drinking fountain which dates from 1876.

== Religious sites ==
The Church of St Mary was built between 1853 and 1863 by Benjamin Ferrey on the site of an earlier church, and has been designated by English Heritage as a Grade II* listed building. Buckland House was built in 1832 as the vicarage but is now a private house.

Birchwood Chapel was built in 1887 when the expansion of Birchwood was, confidently anticipated however this failed to materialise and the chapel now stands in the midst of fields and orchards behind the hamlet.

== Cultural references ==
The parish features in the 1985 book Larksleve and other novels by Patricia Wendorf.

In folklore Buckland St. Mary is said to have a special significance. In folklore Pixies and Fairies are antagonists. They battled at Buckland St. Mary; the Pixies were victorious and still visit the area, whilst the Fairies are said to have left after their loss. Peer-reviewed proof of their presence is scarce.

== Notable people ==
- Robert Hawkins, (1879-1962) Canadian politician, born in the village
