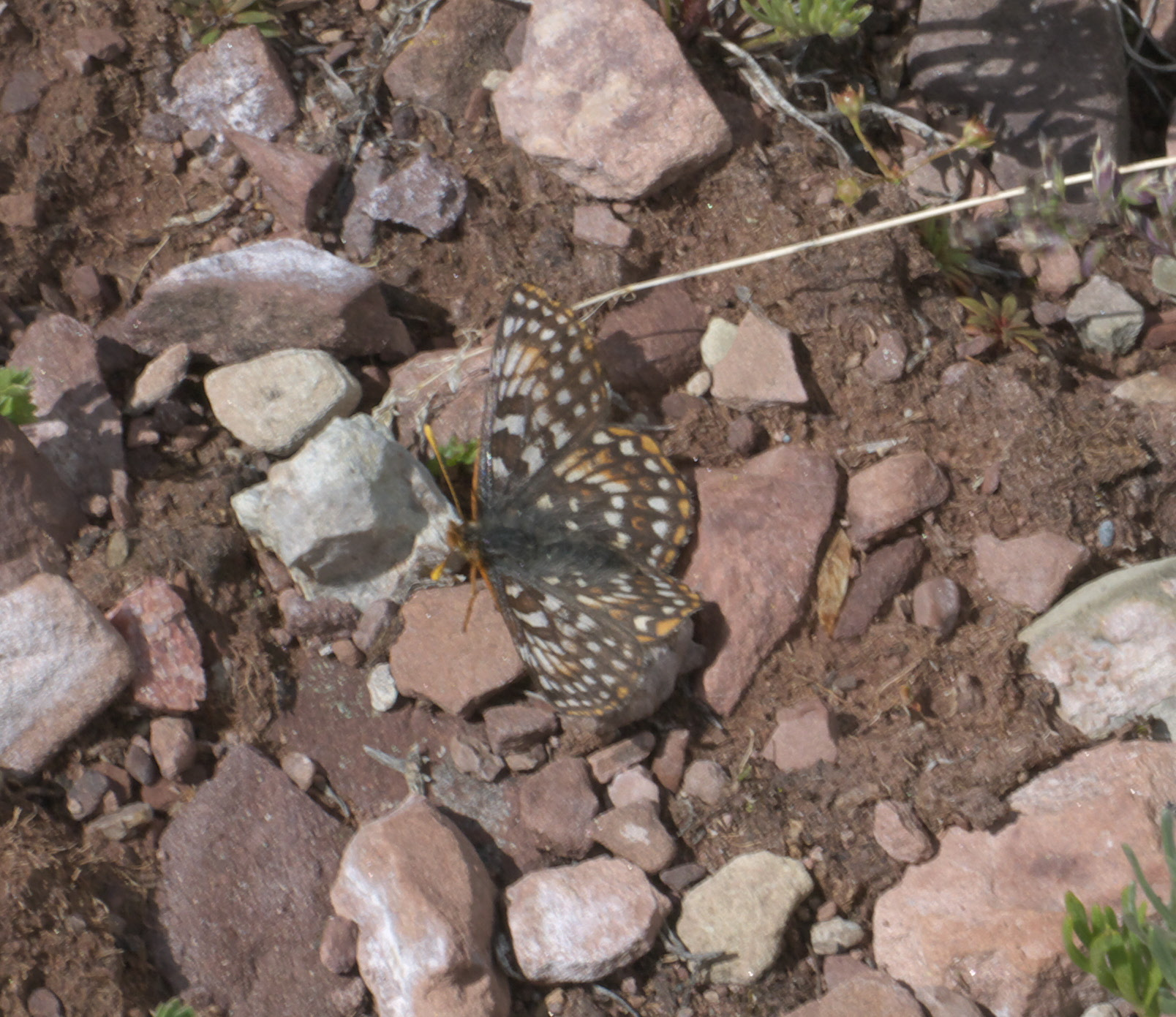

Scientific classification
- Kingdom: Animalia
- Phylum: Arthropoda
- Clade: Pancrustacea
- Class: Insecta
- Order: Lepidoptera
- Family: Nymphalidae
- Genus: Euphydryas
- Species: E. anicia

Binomial name
- Euphydryas anicia (E. Doubleday, 1847)

= Euphydryas anicia =

Species of butterfly

Euphydryas anicia, the anicia checkerspot, is a species of butterfly in the family Nymphalidae. It was first described by Edward Doubleday in 1847 and is found from central to western North America.

== Description ==
Wings of the anicia checkerspot are mainly red with black bands and yellow on the dorsal side and pointed forewings. At higher elevations the species is noticeably darker. Their antennae clubs are yellow with a base of black The abdomen has white off-centered spots. Their brown compound eyes differentiates them from other species in the family.

It has the longest dorsal arms in the genus. The anicia checkerspot differs from Euphydryas editha and Euphydryas gillettii due to their lack of white spots on the abdomen and a marigold band at the submarginal region and larger pointed forewings. The male genitalia is the only reliable visual difference to the similar Euphydryas chaldedona.

== Habitat ==
The anicia checkerspot is found in the western part of North America. They can be found as north as the Yukon to Manitoba and as far south as New Mexico and Arizona. The species can be found in any elevation, located in many environments such as mountain summits, grasslands, canyons, and dry conifer forests. They are non-migratory species and fly only once a year.

== Diet ==
The larvae are herbivores that eat a variety of plants including Plantago erecta, Besseya wyomingensis, and Symphoricarpos spp.. The larvae are known to eat plants that contain iridoid glycosides. The diet of the species is dependent on the plants available in the area, and will feed on other plants if the preferred host plants are not available. Adults are nectarivores which drink from a variety of flowers such as penstemon and dogbane, and mud puddles for adult males.

== Life cycle ==
Female anicia checkerspots produce 2-3 sets of eggs, which they hide under their host plant's leaves. They hatch after two weeks and the larvae then make a silk shelter on their host plant that acts as protection. This structure usually lasts until winter or the defoliation of a plant. The larvae enter diapause after the third or fourth molt. This process starts around early autumn, until the larvae come out and begin feeding during early spring.

Environmental factors such as moisture and temperature during spring are cues to end the period of diapause. If conditions are not favourable, then the length of the diapause can last for more than one year. Climate change can offset diapause by affecting the conditions of the environmental cues. The larvae start to pupate after 3-4 more molts. The triggers for pupation are still not well understood.

Climate change can negatively affect the life cycle of the butterfly through the environment. The mortality rate for the caterpillars is 98% which is similar to other butterflies. In the adult stage, their once-a-year flight takes place from late May to mid-August depending on the elevation and range. This flight period enables them to find their mates before their short lives end.

== Defense ==
Iridoid glycosides, obtained through their host plants, are a chemical defense used by anicia checkerspots. Iridoid glycosides are used by many plants for various reasons including healing damaged areas and fighting off infections. They are gathered by anicia checkerspots larvae and are kept throughout life, although they lose some by their final larval molt.

The anicia checkerspot keeps them as glycosides to stop harmful effects which normally happens when converting them into aglycones. They use their bright red, yellow and black bands as aposematic coloration to deter predators from eating due to their unpalatability caused by the chemicals.

== Conservation status ==
The anicia checkerspot is globally considered G5 secure and common throughout its range. While small number of places on the continent have it considered G3 Vulnerable to G1 critically imperiled such as the mid-western parts of southern Canada.

The subspecies E.a. cloudcrofti is considered endangered by the U.S. Fish and Wildlife Service due to various reasons such as climate change, construction, and invasive plants. A 2025 survey failed to find any individuals in the wild. In 2026, the last known individual died in captivity, though the subspecies may yet survive in the wild.

== Subspecies ==
These 24 subspecies belong to Euphydryas anicia:

- Euphydryas anicia alena Barnes & Benjamin, 1926^{i}
- Euphydryas anicia anicia (E. Doubleday, 1847)^{i b} (anicia checkerspot)
- Euphydryas anicia bakeri D. Stallings & Turner, 1945^{i}
- Euphydryas anicia bernadetta Leussler, 1920^{i}
- Euphydryas anicia brucei (W. H. Edwards, 1888)^{i b}
- Euphydryas anicia capella (Barnes, 1897)^{i b} (capella checkerspot)
- Euphydryas anicia carmentis Barnes & Benjamin, 1926^{i b}
- Euphydryas anicia chuskae (Ferris & R. Holland, 1980)^{i}
- Euphydryas anicia cloudcrofti (Ferris & R. Holland, 1980)^{i b} (Sacramento Mountain checkerspot)
- Euphydryas anicia effi D. Stallings & Turner, 1945^{i}
- Euphydryas anicia eurytion (Mead, 1875)^{i b} (anicia checkerspot)
- Euphydryas anicia helvia (Scudder, 1869)^{i}
- Euphydryas anicia hermosa (W. G. Wright, 1905)^{i b} (Catalina mountain checkerspot)
- Euphydryas anicia hopfingeri Gunder, 1934^{i b} (Hopfinger's checkerspot)
- Euphydryas anicia howlandi D. Stallings & Turner, 1947^{i}
- Euphydryas anicia macyi Fender & Jewett, 1953^{i}
- Euphydryas anicia magdalena Barnes & McDunnough, 1918^{i b} (White Mountain checkerspot)
- Euphydryas anicia maria (Skinner, 1899)^{i}
- Euphydryas anicia morandi Gunder, 1928^{i}
- Euphydryas anicia variicolor Baughman & Murphy, 1998^{i}
- Euphydryas anicia veazieae Fender & Jewett, 1953^{i}
- Euphydryas anicia wecoeut M. Fisher, Spomer & Scott, 2006^{i b} (anicia checkerspot)
- Euphydryas anicia wheeleri (Hy. Edwards, 1881)^{i b}
- Euphydryas anicia windi Gunder, 1932^{i b} (Wind's checkerspot)

Data sources: i = ITIS, c = Catalogue of Life, g = GBIF, b = Bugguide.net
