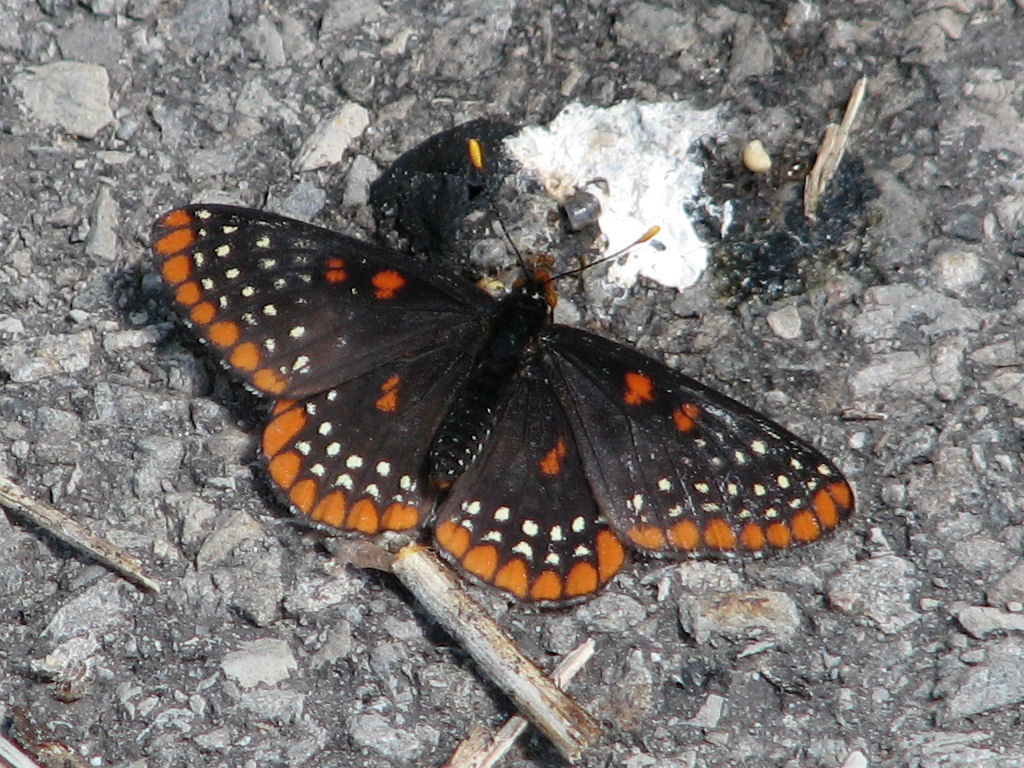
- Euphydryas phaeton, Ottawa, Ontario, Canada

Scientific classification
- Kingdom: Animalia
- Phylum: Arthropoda
- Class: Insecta
- Order: Lepidoptera
- Family: Nymphalidae
- Tribe: Melitaeini
- Genus: Euphydryas; Scudder, 1872

= Euphydryas =

Genus of butterflies

Euphydryas is a genus of Nymphalidae butterflies.

== Species ==
Subgenus	Butterfly	Caterpillar	Species	Common name	Distribution	Host
Euphydryas			Euphydryas phaeton (Drury, 1773)	Baltimore checkerspot	North America	Chelone glabra, Plantago lanceolata
Hypodryas			Euphydryas maturna (Linnaeus, 1758)	scarce fritillary	Austria, Belgium, Bulgaria, Czech Republic, Finland, France, Germany, Greece, Hungary, Kazakhstan, Lithuania, Luxembourg, Poland, Romania, Russia, Serbia and Montenegro, and Sweden.	Fraxinus excelsior, Viburnum opulus
Hypodryas			Euphydryas italica Back, Haussmann, Salk & Weiss, 2015		Italy	
Hypodryas			Euphydryas intermedia (Ménétriés, 1859)		Alps, Middle and South Ural, in the taiga zone and the West Siberian Lowland, South Siberia and the Russian Far East, Sakhalin, Mongolia, Northeast China, North Korea	Veronica, Lonicera, Thalictrum
Hypodryas			Euphydryas ichnea (Boisduval, 1833)		Urals to Sakhalin; the Alps, Mongolia, NE. China, Korea	
Hypodryas			Euphydryas cynthia (Schiffermüller, 1775)	Cynthia's fritillary	Bulgaria	Plantago alpina, and Alchemilla
Hypodryas			Euphydryas iduna (Dalman, 1816)	Lapland fritillary	Arctic Europe, Arctic Asia, Caucasus Major, Alatau, Russian Far East, Altai, Sayan	Plantago, Veronica, Vaccinium
Hypodryas			Euphydryas gillettii (Barnes, 1897)	Gillette's checkerspot	British Columbia to Oregon and from the Rocky Mountains to the Pacific Ocean.	Lonicera involucrata, Pedicularis groenlandica, Valeriana occidentalis, Lonicera caerulea
Occidryas			Euphydryas anicia (Doubleday, 1847)	Anicia checkerspot	North America	Plantago erecta
Occidryas			Euphydryas chalcedona (Doubleday, 1847)	Chalcedon checkerspot or variable checkerspot	Rocky Mountains into Colorado, Montana, New Mexico and Wyoming.	Symphoricarpos, Castilleja, Buddleja, Diplacus aurantiacus and Scrophularia californica
Occidryas			Euphydryas editha (Boisduval, 1852)	Edith's checkerspot	southern British Columbia and Alberta south to Baja California, Nevada, Utah, and Colorado	Castilleja, Penstemon, Pedicularis, Orthocarpus,Collinsia
Eurodryas			Euphydryas aurinia (Rottemburg, 1775)	marsh fritillary	Ireland in the west to Yakutia in the east, and to north-west China and Mongolia in the south	Succisa pratensis
Eurodryas			Euphydryas beckeri (Lederer, 1853)		France	Lonicera
Eurodryas			Euphydryas discordia Bolshakov & Korb, 2013		Russia, Republic of Karachaevo-Cherkessia, N. Caucasus	
Eurodryas			Euphydryas orientalis (Herrich-Schäffer, 1851)		Russian Federation (Urals) Turkey, Transcaucasia, Kazakhstan	Scabiosa isetensis
Eurodryas			Euphydryas asiatica (Staudinger, 1881)		Kazakhstan, Dzhungarsky Alatau, Tian Shan	
Eurodryas			Euphydryas sibirica (Staudinger, 1871)		north-eastern Asia	Scabiosa lachnophylla
Eurodryas			Euphydryas laeta (Christoph, 1893)		Kazakhstan	Succisa pratensis
Eurodryas			Euphydryas desfontainii (Godart, 1819)	Spanish fritillary	France, Spain, Morocco	Dipsacus, Scabiosa, Cephalaria, Knautia
