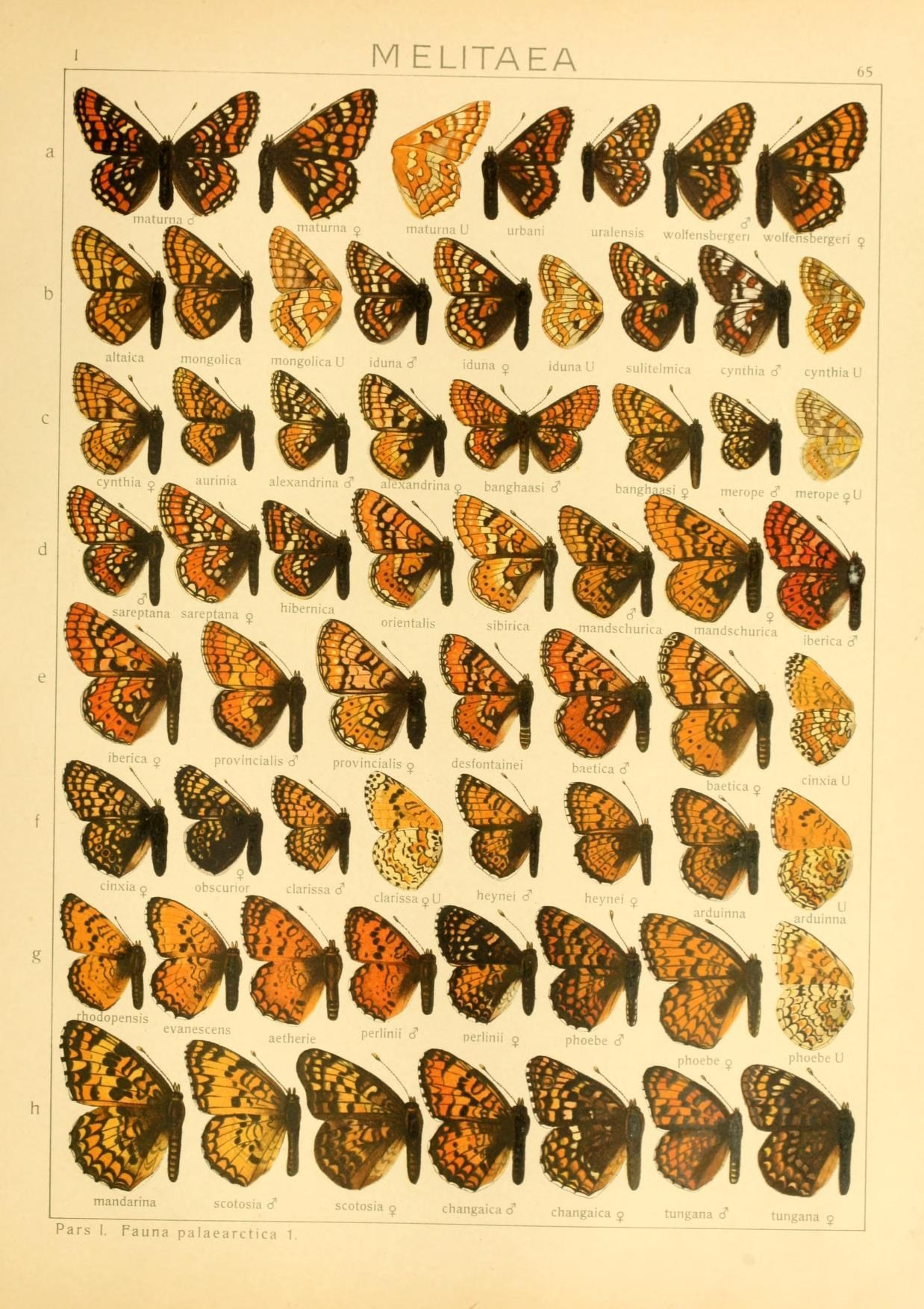
- Euphydryas asiatica alexandrina in Seitz (65c)

Scientific classification
- Kingdom: Animalia
- Phylum: Arthropoda
- Class: Insecta
- Order: Lepidoptera
- Family: Nymphalidae
- Genus: Euphydryas
- Species: E. asiatica

Binomial name
- Euphydryas asiatica (Staudinger, 1881)

= Euphydryas asiatica =

Species of butterfly

Euphydryas asiatica is a small butterfly found in the Palearctic that belongs to the browns family.

== Subspecies ==
- Euphydryas asiatica asiatica; Turkestan, Tarbagatai, Saur, Dzhungarsky Alatau
- Euphydryas asiatica alexandrina (Staudinger, 1887); Tian-Shan
- Euphydryas asiatica narina (Oberthür, 1909); Inner Tian-Shan

== Taxonomy ==
Euphydryas asiatica is in the subgenus Eurodryas. The clade members are:

- Euphydryas aurinia (Rottemburg, 1775)
- Euphydryas provincialis (Boisduval, 1828)
- Euphydryas orientalis (Herrich-Schäffer, 1851)
- Euphydryas asiatica (Staudinger, 1881)
- Euphydryas sibirica (Staudinger, 1871)
- Euphydryas laeta (Christoph, 1893)
- Euphydryas desfontainii (Godart, 1819)
