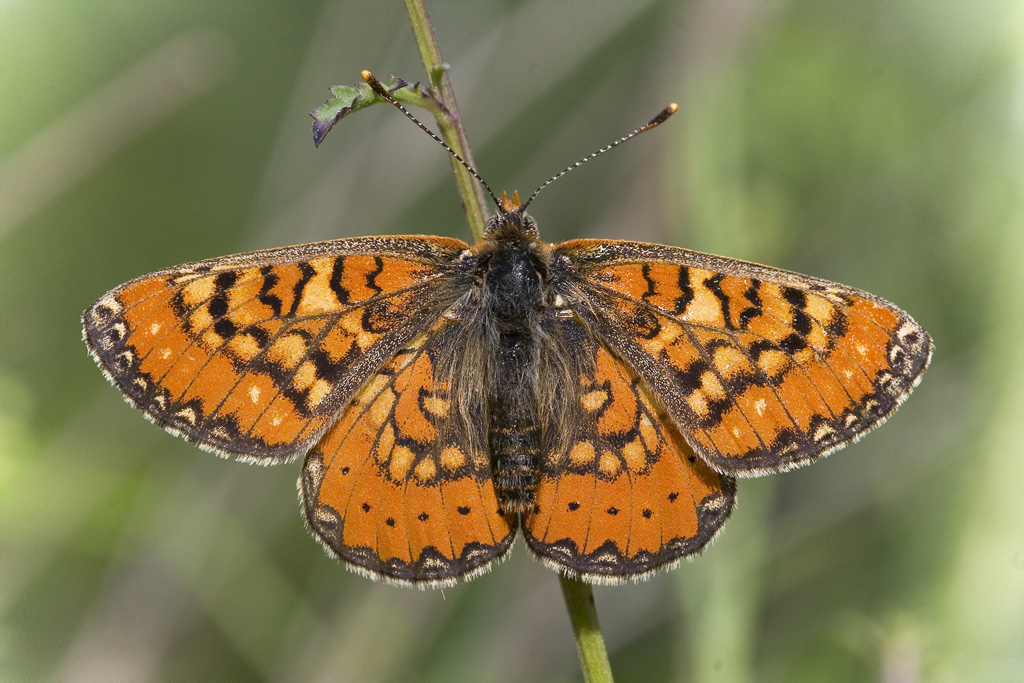

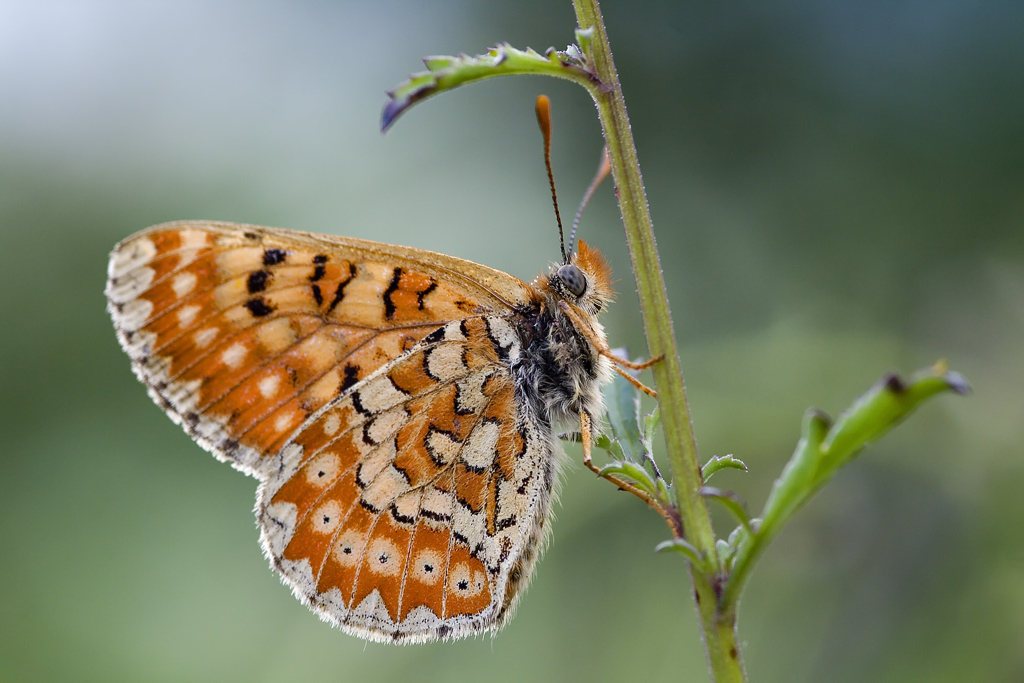

Scientific classification
- Kingdom: Animalia
- Phylum: Arthropoda
- Class: Insecta
- Order: Lepidoptera
- Family: Nymphalidae
- Genus: Euphydryas
- Species: E. desfontainii

Binomial name
- Euphydryas desfontainii (Godart, 1819)

Synonyms
- Papilio desfontainii Godart, 1819; Argynnis desfontainii; Melitaea desfontainii var. gibrati Oberthür, 1922; Melitaea baetica Rambur, 1858; Euphydryas desfontainii martae

= Euphydryas desfontainii =

Species of butterfly

Euphydryas desfontainii, the Spanish fritillary, is a species of butterfly in the family Nymphalidae. It is found in France, Portugal, Spain, Morocco (the Rif mountains and Middle Atlas) and western Algeria in North Africa.

== Description ==
The wingspan is 40–45 mm. In desfontainii Godt. (= desfontainesi Bdv.), which was separated as a distinct species, because it occurs in the same districts as iberica, the proximal edge of the submarginal band of the forewing is very strongly flexuose, the distal margin bears small light rings or lunules placed in dark hastate spots; the submarginal band is almost so broad as in iberica and contrasts strongly with the light yellow discal band which stands at its proximal side and is broadly bordered with deep black. In baetica Rbr. from Andalusia, the submarginal band is so broad that it occupies the external third of the forewing and almost the outer half of the hindwing.

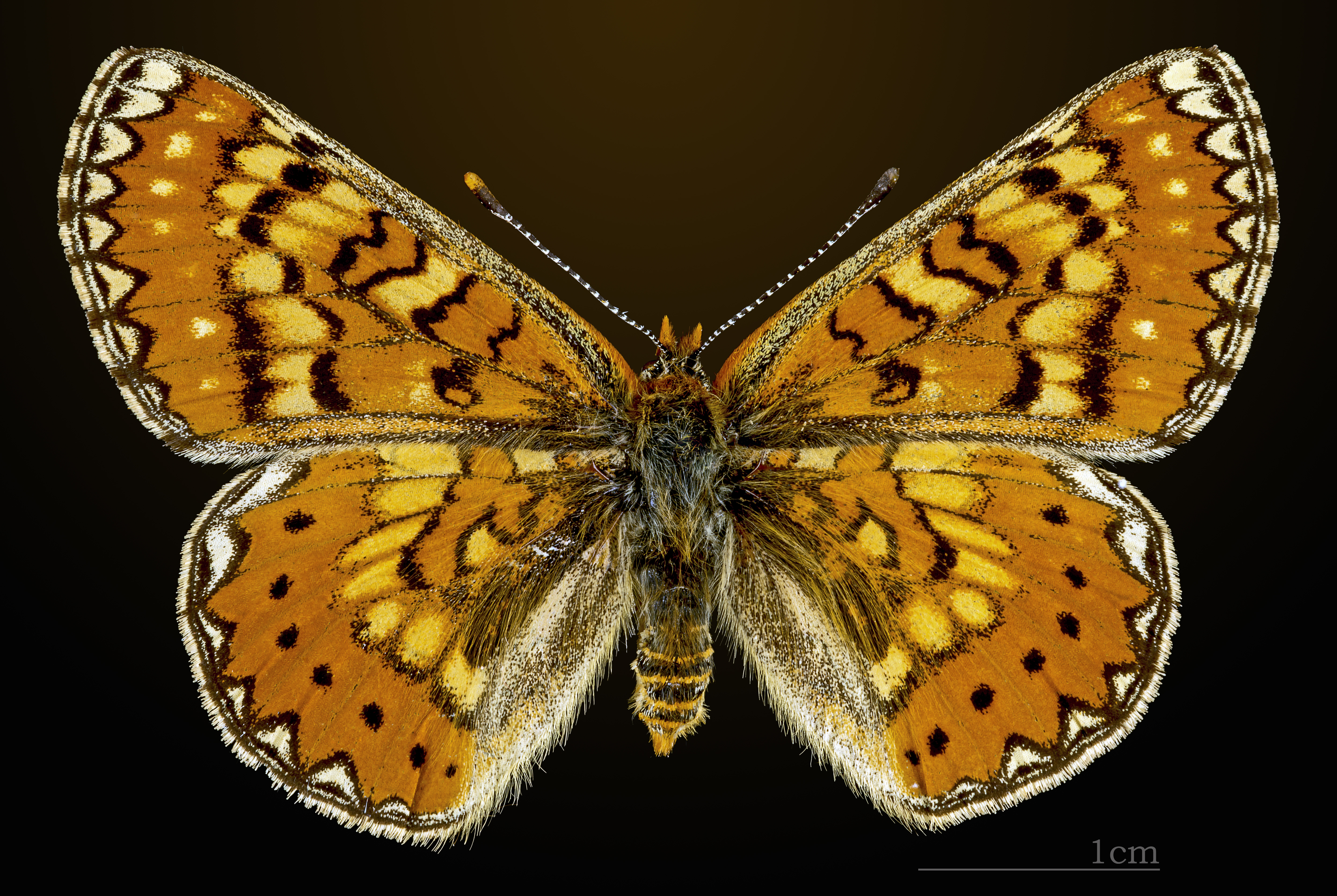
Euphydryas desfontainii desfontainii ♂

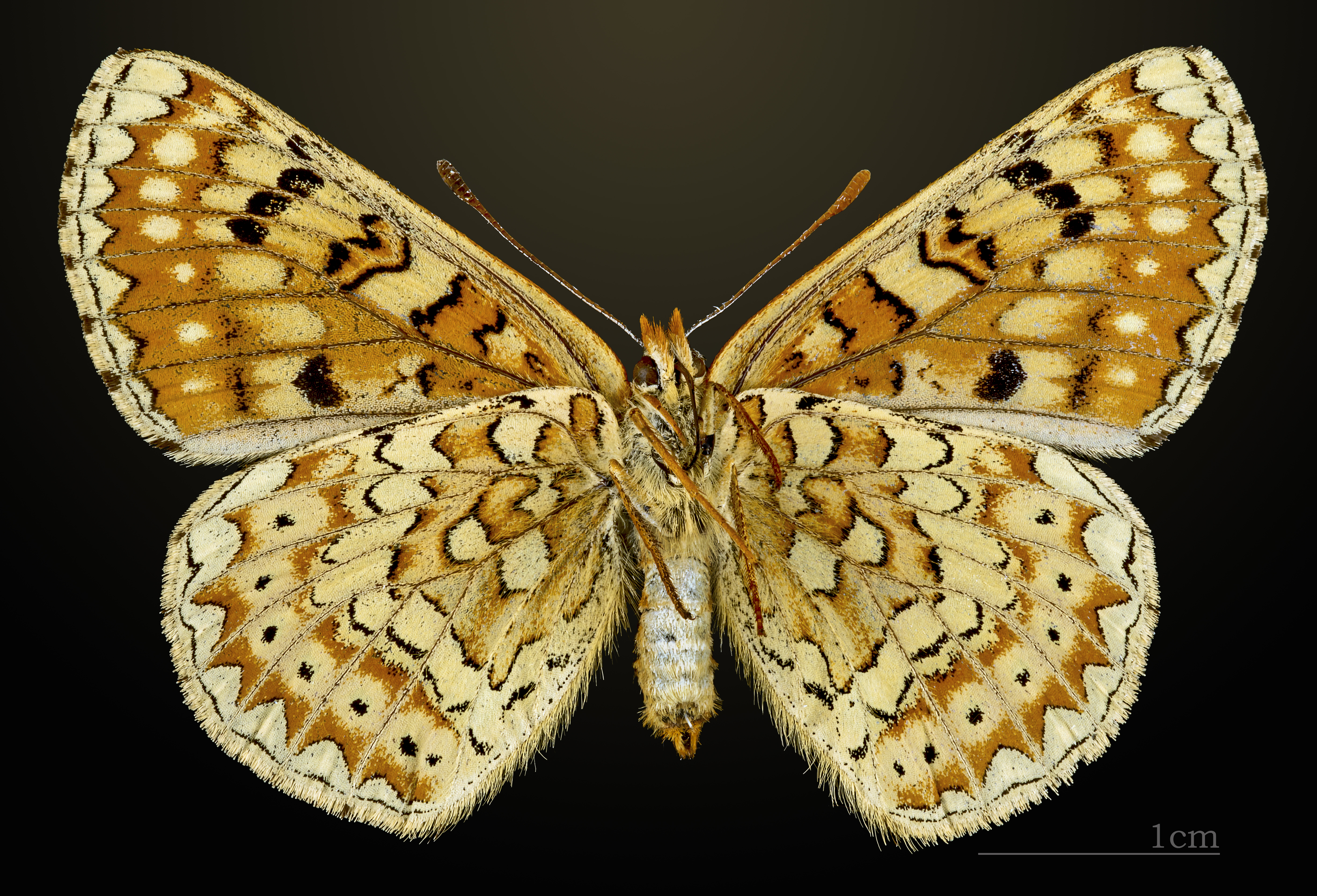
Euphydryas desfontainii desfontainii ♂ △
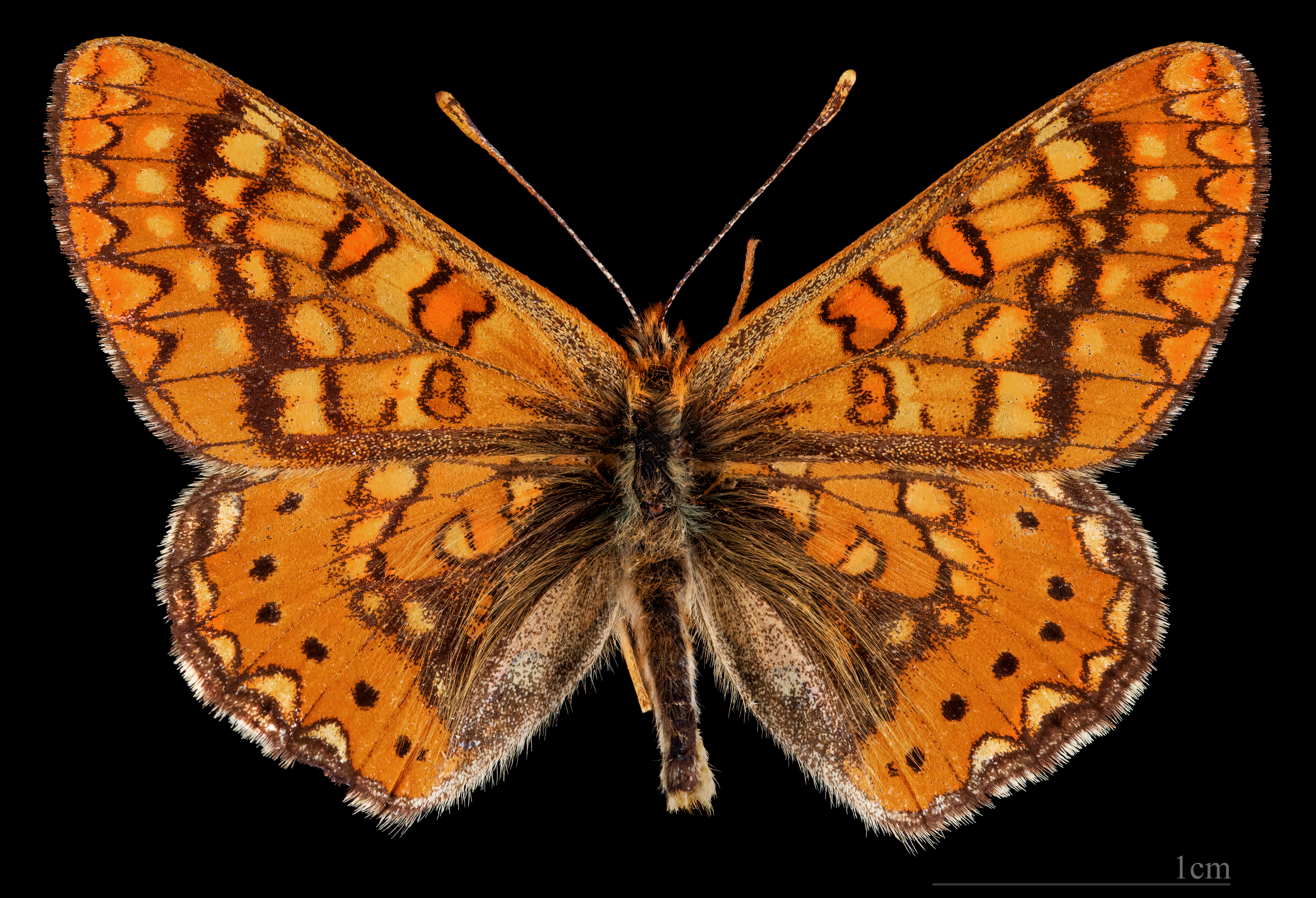
Euphydryas desfontainii beatica ♂

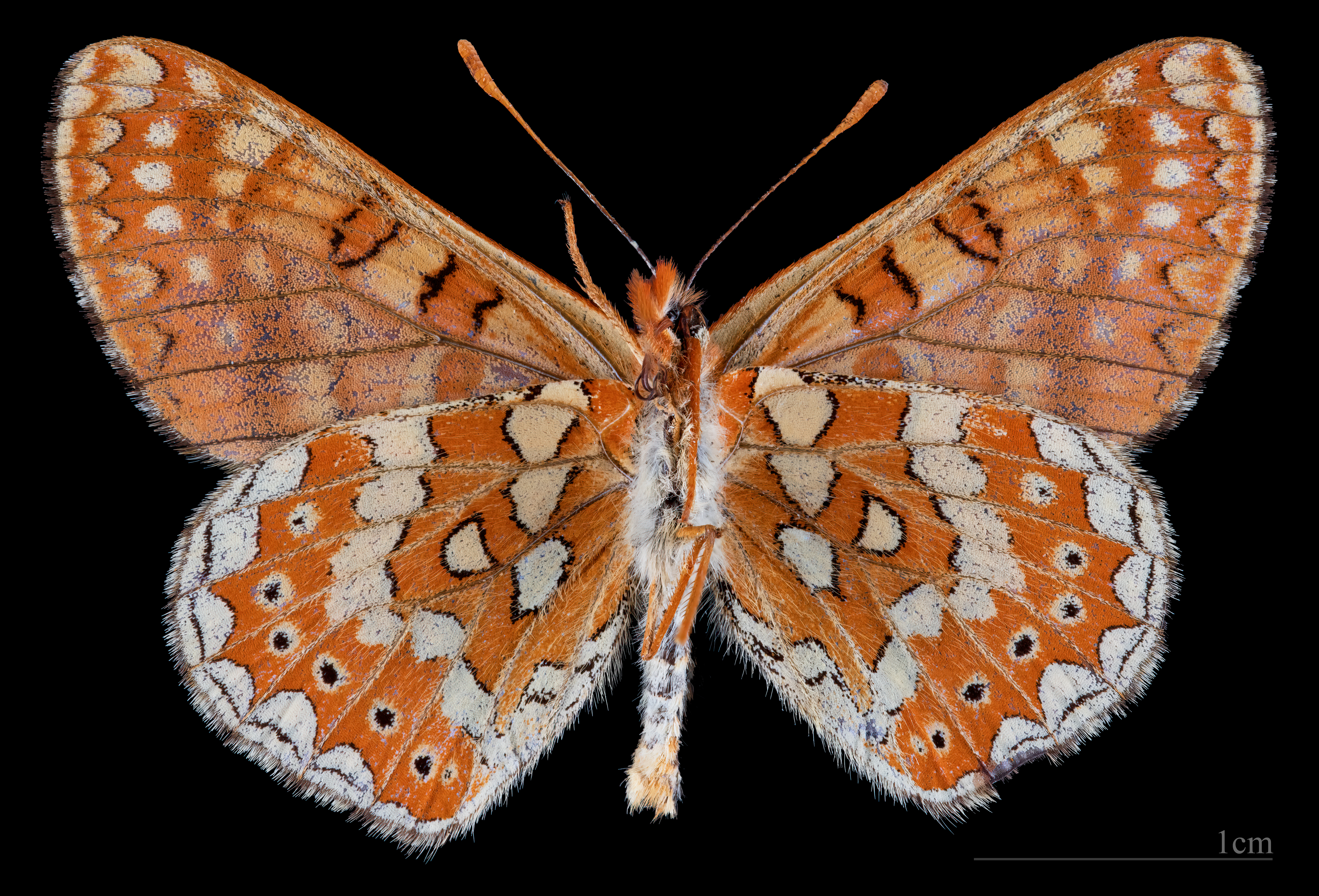
Euphydryas desfontainii beatica♂ △

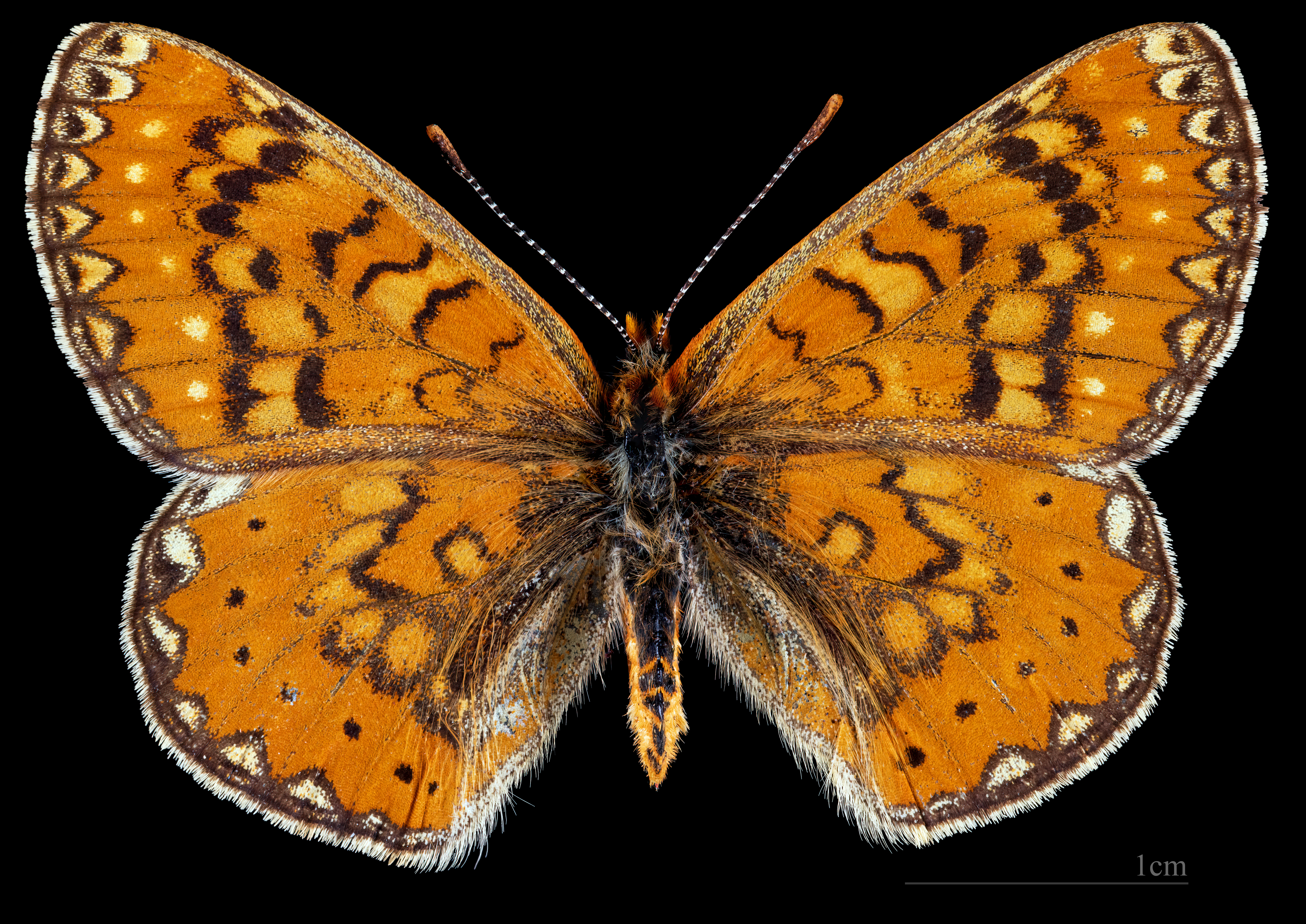
Euphydryas desfontainii beatica ♀

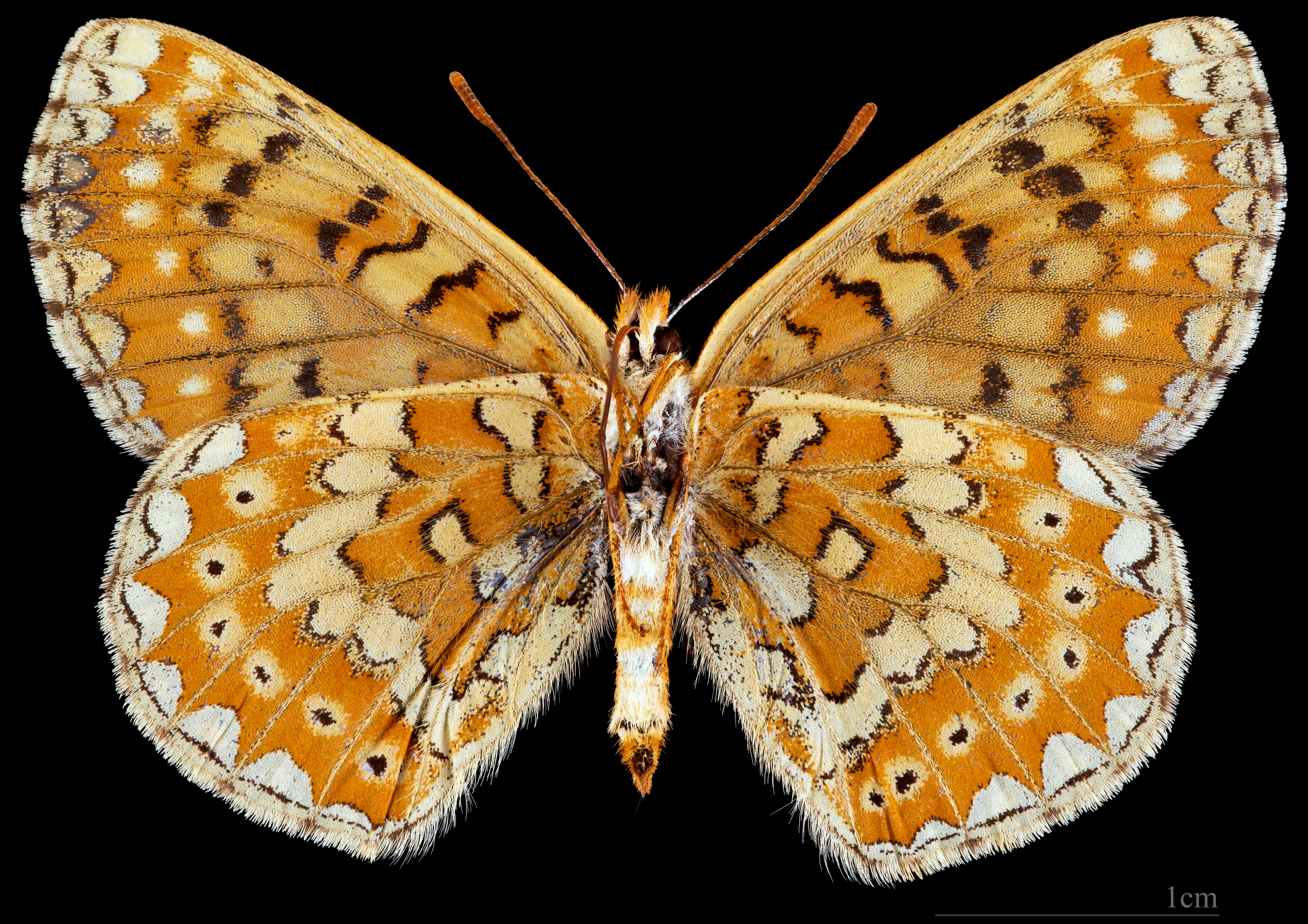
Euphydryas desfontainii beatica ♀ △

== Biology ==
Adults are on wing from April to June in one generation per year.

The larvae feed on Dipsacus, Scabiosa, Cephalaria and Knautia species (including Knautia arvensis). The species overwinters in the larval stage. Pupation takes place in spring.

== Subspecies ==
- Euphydryas desfontainii desfontainii (Morocco and Algeria)
- Euphydryas desfontainii baetica (Rambur, 1858) (Europe)
- Euphydryas desfontainii boumalnei Weiss 2000
- Euphydryas desfontainii gibrati (Oberthür, 1922)

== Taxonomy ==
E. desfontainii is in the subgenus Eurodryas The clade members are:

- Euphydryas aurinia (Rottemburg, 1775)
- Euphydryas provincialis (Boisduval, 1828)
- Euphydryas orientalis (Herrich-Schäffer, 1851)
- Euphydryas asiatica (Staudinger, 1881)
- Euphydryas sibirica (Staudinger, 1871)
- Euphydryas laeta (Christoph, 1893)
- Euphydryas desfontainii (Godart, 1819)
