= Deadman SSSI, Somerset =

Protected area in Somerset, England

Deadman
- Site of Special Scientific Interest
- Location within Somerset
- Location of Deadman.
- Area of search: Somerset
- Grid reference: ST234156
- Coordinates: 50.93474°N 3.09147°W
- Interest: Biological
- Area: 28.8 hectares (0.288 km^{2}; 0.111 sq mi)
- Notification date: 1987

Deadman (grid reference ST234156) is a 28.8 hectare (71.2 acre) biological Site of Special Scientific Interest on the edge of the Blackdown Hills, near Buckland St Mary 5 miles (8.0 km) south of Taunton in Somerset, notified in 1987.

Deadman is one of the best remaining examples of a mixed valley mire in Somerset. It contains a rich mosaic of wet heath, bog pools and birch/willow carr grading into acid marshy grassland. These communities support several species of plant which are rare in the county. Ground water issues from numerous springs within the greensand producing a locally raised water table and shallow peaty surface horizon. It is at these points that bog communities develop, characterised by the floating leaves of bog pondweed (Potamogeton polygonifolia), bog bean (Menyanthes trifoliata) and marsh St John's-wort (Hypericum elodes). In places this wet heath has undergone a transition to birch (Betula sp.) and willow (Salix sp.) carr. This provides an important habitat for breeding nightingales and grasshopper warblers.
