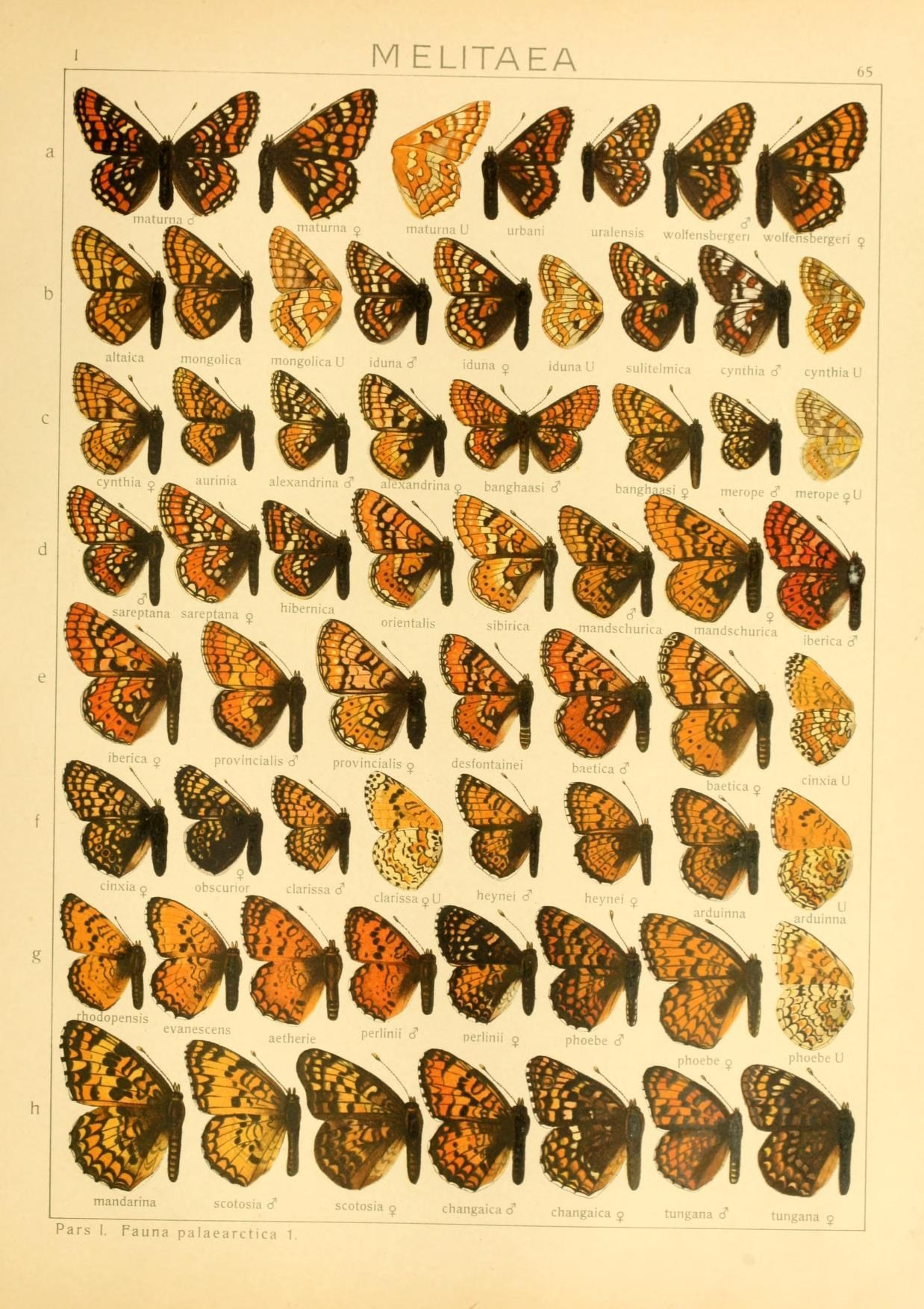
- Euphydryas orientalis sareptensis (Staudinger, 1878) as sareptana and E. o. orientalis (Herrich-Schäffer, 1851) in Seitz (65d)

Scientific classification
- Kingdom: Animalia
- Phylum: Arthropoda
- Class: Insecta
- Order: Lepidoptera
- Family: Nymphalidae
- Genus: Euphydryas
- Species: E. orientalis

Binomial name
- Euphydryas orientalis (Herrich-Schäffer, 1851)

= Euphydryas orientalis =

Species of butterfly

Euphydryas orientalis is a small butterfly found in the Palearctic that belongs to the browns family.

== Description ==
Difficult to distinguish from some aurinia forms. Tusov treats orientalis as a subspecies of aurinia.

Seitz: "orientalis H.-Schaff. (65d) is apparently a combination of the two previous [subspecies of aurinia- pellucida Christ. [E. aurinia pellucida (Christoph, 1893)], from the Caucasus (recognizable by the thin scaling, in consequence of which all the colours appear paler and the wings slightly transparent. The markings, however, are as abundant as the colours are weak and inconspicuous) and laeta Christ [E. aurinia laeta (Christoph, 1893)]( differs from the preceding in the denser scaling and more conspicuous colours, the upperside having a rather chequered appearance in consequence of the strongly developed and several times curved black discal bands; from the Vilui Mts. in Siberia] the upperside being as bright and variegated as in laeta, while the underside is as pale, dull and uniform in colour as in pellucida. Asia Minor and Armenia to Kurdistan."

== Subspecies ==
- Euphydryas orientalisorientalis; Turkey, Transcaucasia 65d on plate
- Euphydryas orientalis sareptensis (Staudinger, 1878); South Ural 65d on plate
- Euphydryas orientalis emba (Fruhstorfer, 1917); Kazakhstan
- Euphydryas orientalis pellucida (Christoph, 1893);
- Euphydryas aurinia pellucida (Christoph, 1893) in some works; Caucasus

== Taxonomy ==
Euphydryas orientalis is in the subgenus Eurodryas. The clade members are:

- Euphydryas aurinia (Rottemburg, 1775)
- Euphydryas provincialis (Boisduval, 1828)
- Euphydryas orientalis (Herrich-Schäffer, 1851)
- Euphydryas asiatica (Staudinger, 1881)
- Euphydryas sibirica (Staudinger, 1871)
- Euphydryas laeta (Christoph, 1893)
- Euphydryas desfontainii (Godart, 1819)

== Biology ==
Found in steppe meadows and in limestone ravines. Flies from June to July. The larva feeds on Scabiosa isetensis.

== Similar species ==
- Euphydryas aurinia
- Euphydryas asiatica
- Euphydryas provincialis
- Euphydryas merope; synonym of Euphydryas aurinia merope (de Prunner, 1798)

== See also ==
- List of butterflies of Europe
