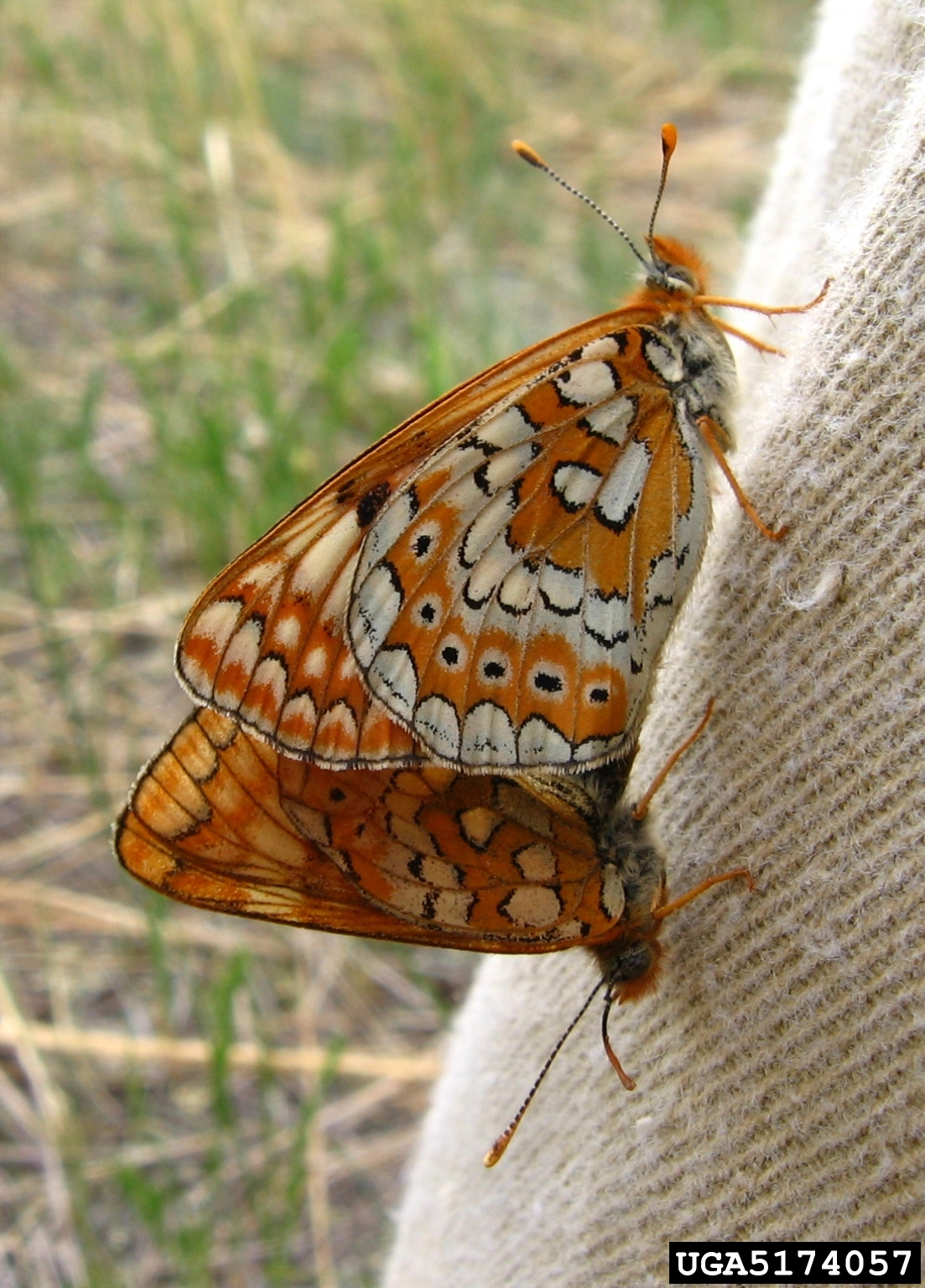
- Euphydryas sibirica davidi

Scientific classification
- Domain: Eukaryota
- Kingdom: Animalia
- Phylum: Arthropoda
- Class: Insecta
- Order: Lepidoptera
- Family: Nymphalidae
- Genus: Euphydryas
- Species: E. sibirica

Binomial name
- Euphydryas sibirica (Staudinger, 1871)

Synonyms
- Euphydryas mandschurica (Staudinger, 1892) (preocc.); Euphydryas tjutjujensis Higgins, 1950; Melitaea artemis var. davidi Oberthür, 1881; Euphydryas koreana (Collier, 1933); Euphydryas discalis (Bryk, 1946)

= Euphydryas sibirica =

Species of butterfly

Euphydryas sibirica is a butterfly of the family Nymphalidae. It is found in north-eastern Asia, where it is found in steppe or steppe-like meadows.

Adults are on wing from June to July.

The larvae of subspecies eothena feed on Scabiosa lachnophylla.

== Subspecies ==
- Euphydryas sibirica sibirica (Transbaikalia)
- Euphydryas sibirica eothena (Röber, 1926) (Amur, Ussuri)
- Euphydryas sibirica davidi (Oberthür, 1881) (northern China, Tuva, Mongolia) - David's checkerspot
- Euphydryas sibirica tenebricosa (Bang-Haas, 1927) (China: Gansu)
- Euphydryas sibirica phyllis Hemming, 1941 (North Korea)

== Taxonomy ==
E. sibirica is in the subgenus Eurodryas The clade members are:

- Euphydryas aurinia (Rottemburg, 1775)
- Euphydryas provincialis (Boisduval, 1828)
- Euphydryas orientalis (Herrich-Schäffer, 1851)
- Euphydryas asiatica (Staudinger, 1881)
- Euphydryas sibirica (Staudinger, 1871)
- Euphydryas laeta (Christoph, 1893)
- Euphydryas desfontainii (Godart, 1819)
