= Long Lye =

- Site of Special Scientific Interest
- Location within Somerset
- Location of Long Lye.
- Area of search: Somerset
- Grid reference: ST265122
- Coordinates: 50.90457°N 3.04667°W
- Interest: Biological
- Area: 11.7 hectares (0.117 km^{2}; 0.045 sq mi)
- Notification date: 1988

Long Lye (grid reference ST265122) is an 11.7 hectare (29.0 acre) biological Site of Special Scientific Interest at Buckland St Mary in the Blackdown Hills, Somerset, notified in 1988.

This site along with the adjoining Long Lye Meadow were considered to be under threat from a scheme to widen the A303.

Long Lye is a traditionally managed neutral grassland of a type which was once characteristic of lowland Britain but has now become increasingly rare due to agricultural intensification. Mature broadleaved woodland and wet flush communities add considerable diversity to this site. Fifteen species of butterfly have been recorded here. They include the silver-washed fritillary (Argynnis paphia), of which the valenzia form has been found, purple hairstreak (Quercusia quercus) and marbled white (Melanargia galathea).
