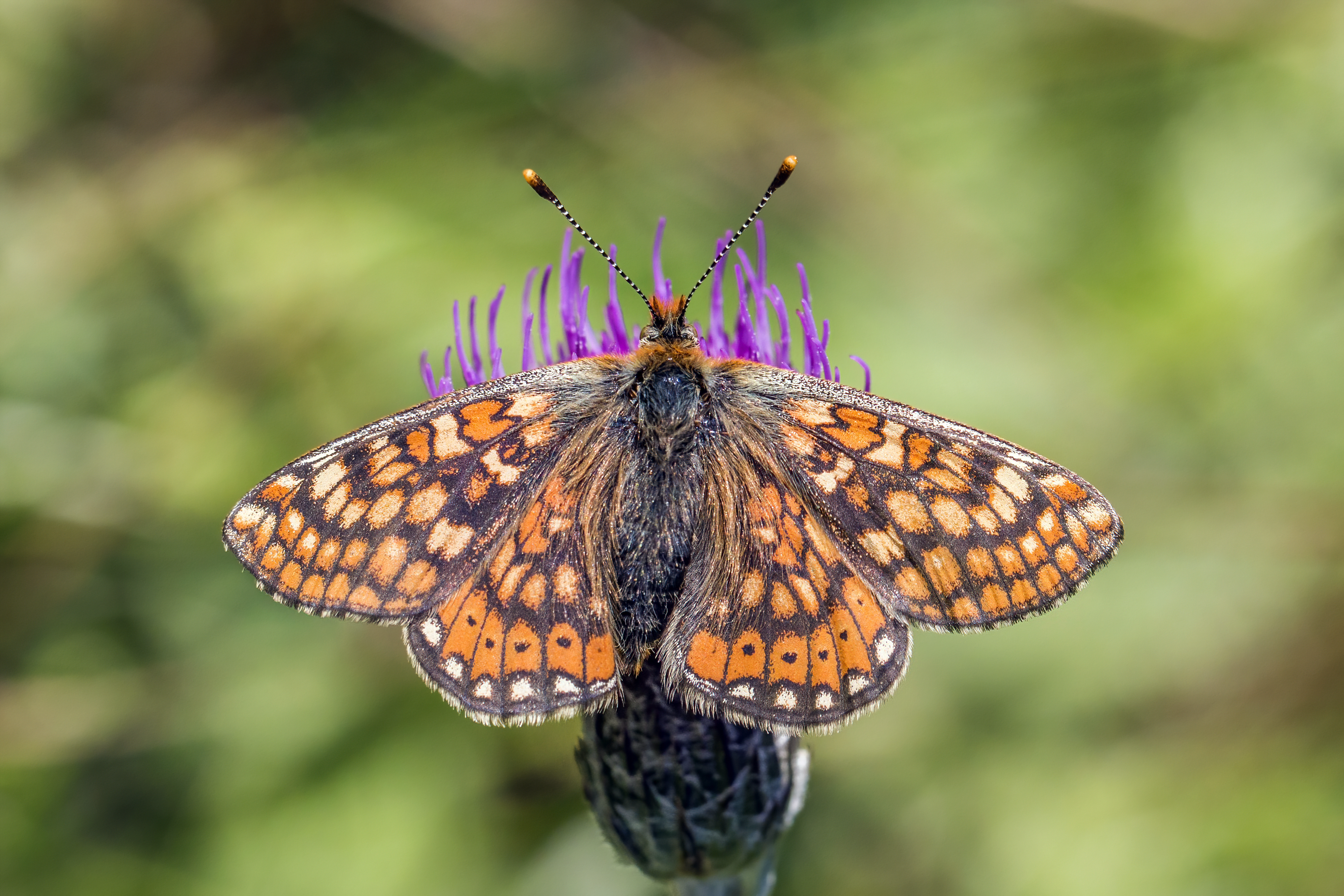
- Male E. a. aurinia, Dorset
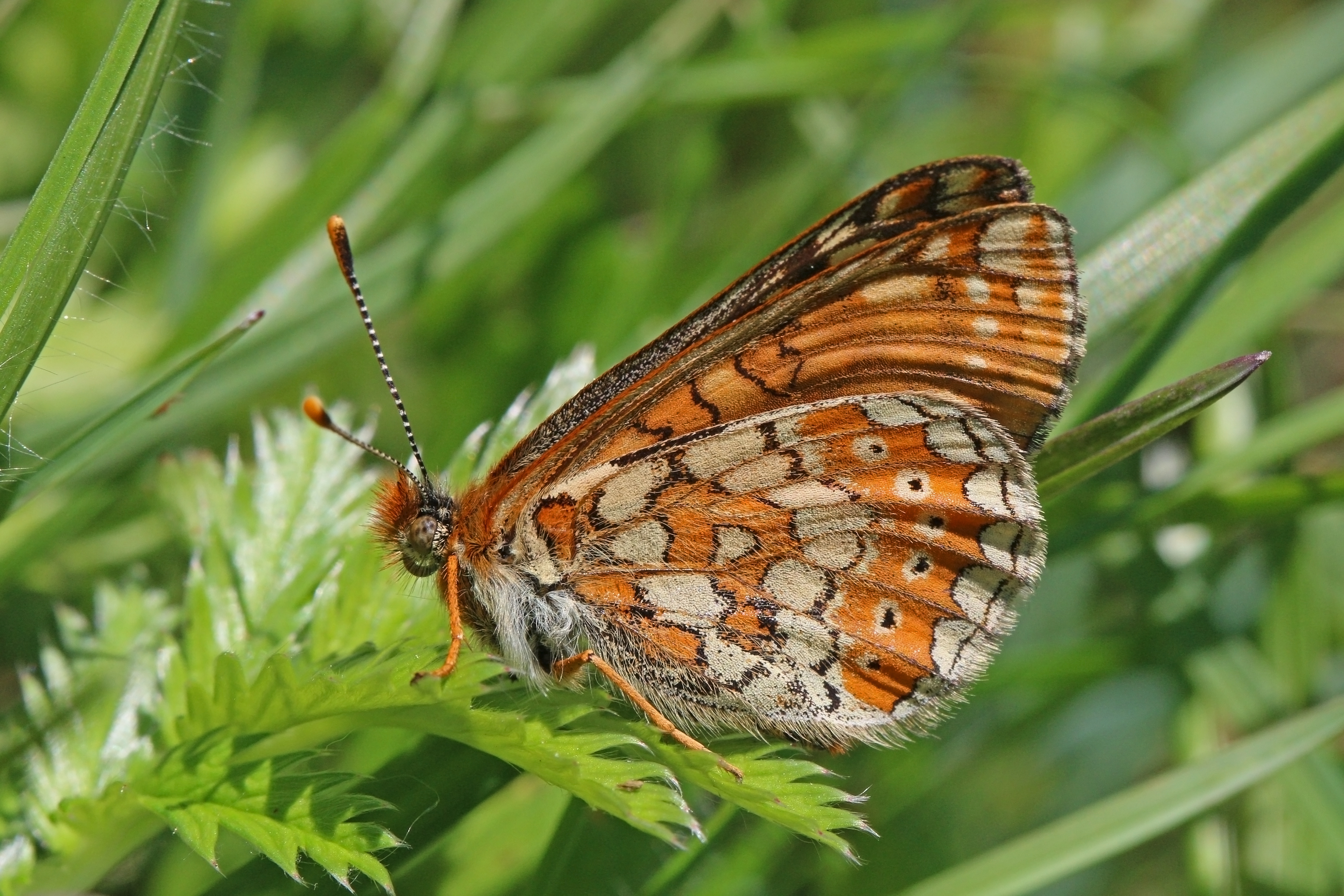
- Female E. a. aurinia, Dorset

Conservation status
- Least Concern (IUCN 3.1)

Scientific classification
- Kingdom: Animalia
- Phylum: Arthropoda
- Clade: Pancrustacea
- Class: Insecta
- Order: Lepidoptera
- Family: Nymphalidae
- Genus: Euphydryas
- Species: E. aurinia

Binomial name
- Euphydryas aurinia (Rottemburg, 1775)

Synonyms
- List: Papilio artemis Denis & Schiffermüller, 1775; Papilio maturna Esper, 1777; Papilio lye Bergsträsser, 1780; Papilio koloswarensis Piller & Mitterpacher, 1783; Papilio matutina Thunberg, 1791; Papilio merope De Prunner, 1798; Melitaea brunnea Tutt, 1896; Melitaea ochrea Tutt, 1896; Melitaea virgata Tutt, 1896; Melitaea nana Rehfons, 1910; Melitaea turbida Gélin & Lucas, 1912; Melitaea unipuncta Kiefer, 1916; Melitaea hoffmanni Kiefer, 1916; Melitaea semifuscata Cabeau, 1919; Melitaea epimolpadia Reverdin, 1919; Melitaea didyma Heinrich, 1923; Melitaea rectiangula Cabeau, 1924; Melitaea catherini Le Charles, 1924; Melitaea perianthes Cabeau, 1926; Melitaea interligata Derenne, 1926; Melitaea gracilens Cabeau, 1927; Melitaea geminifasciata Cabeau, 1927; Melitaea transversa Cabeau, 1928; Melitaea deficiens Cabeau, 1928; Melitaea leucophana Cabeau, 1928; Melitaea frigescens Verity, 1928; Melitaea moritura Verity, 1928; Melitaea debilisprovincialis Verity, 1928; Melitaea valentini Nitsche, 1928; Melitaea semigriseis Cabeau, 1931; Melitaea tetramelana Cabeau, 1931; Melitaea semigracilens Cabeau, 1931; Melitaea melanoleuca Cabeau, 1932; Melitaea flavofasciata Hackray, 1934; Melitaea insterburgia Braun, 1937; Euphydryas albofasciata Frohawk, 1938; Euphydryas suffusa Frohawk, 1938; Melitaea infra-rectiangula Caruel, 1939; Melitaea ocellata Caruel, 1944; Melitaea arcuata Caruel, 1944; Melitaea commacula Caruel, 1944; Melitaea ligata Caruel, 1944; Melitaea splendida Mauny, 1949

= Marsh fritillary =

Euphydryas aurinia

Species of butterfly

The marsh fritillary (Euphydryas aurinia) is a butterfly of the family Nymphalidae. Commonly distributed in the Palearctic region, the marsh fritillary's common name derives from one of its several habitats, marshland. The prolonged larval stage lasts for approximately seven to eight months and includes a period of diapause over the winter. The larvae are dependent on the host food plant Succisa pratensis not only for feeding but also for hibernation, because silken webs are formed on the host plant as the gregarious larvae enter hibernation. Females lay eggs in batches on the host plant and are, like other batch-layers, selective about the location of oviposition because offspring survivorship levels for batch-layers are more tied to location selection than they are for single-egg layers.

As of 2019 the butterfly's global conservation status is considered of least concern, but it has faced rapid decline and is considered regionally vulnerable or endangered over much of its range.

== Taxonomy ==
E. aurinia is represented by many subspecies. The most widely accepted are:

- Euphydryas aurinia aurinia central Europe, southern Europe, western Siberia
- Euphydryas aurinia bulgarica (Fruhstorfer, 1916) Carpathian Mountains
- Euphydryas aurinia laeta (Christoph, 1893) central Siberia, Altai, Sayan, Transbaikal
- Euphydryas aurinia beckeri (Lederer, 1853) Morocco (Middle Atlas, Rif Mountains) submarginal band of the hindwing is of a magnificent deep russet-red colour and nearly occupies the whole outer half of the wing, being outwardly bordered by black lunules centred with pale yellow
- Euphydryas aurinia barraguei (Betz, 1956) Algeria
- Euphydryas aurinia provincialis (Boisduval, 1828) (France and northern Italy)
- Euphydryas aurinia debilis(Oberthür, 1909) Mountainous areas like Pyrenees and Alps

but the total number of described subspecies is much higher, especially in the eastern Palaearctic. The insect may be best considered a superspecies.

E.aurinia is in the subgenus Eurodryas The clade members are:

- Euphydryas aurinia (Rottemburg, 1775)
- Euphydryas provincialis (Boisduval, 1828)
- Euphydryas orientalis (Herrich-Schäffer, 1851)
- Euphydryas asiatica (Staudinger, 1881)
- Euphydryas sibirica (Staudinger, 1871)
- Euphydryas laeta (Christoph, 1893)
- Euphydryas desfontainii (Godart, 1819)
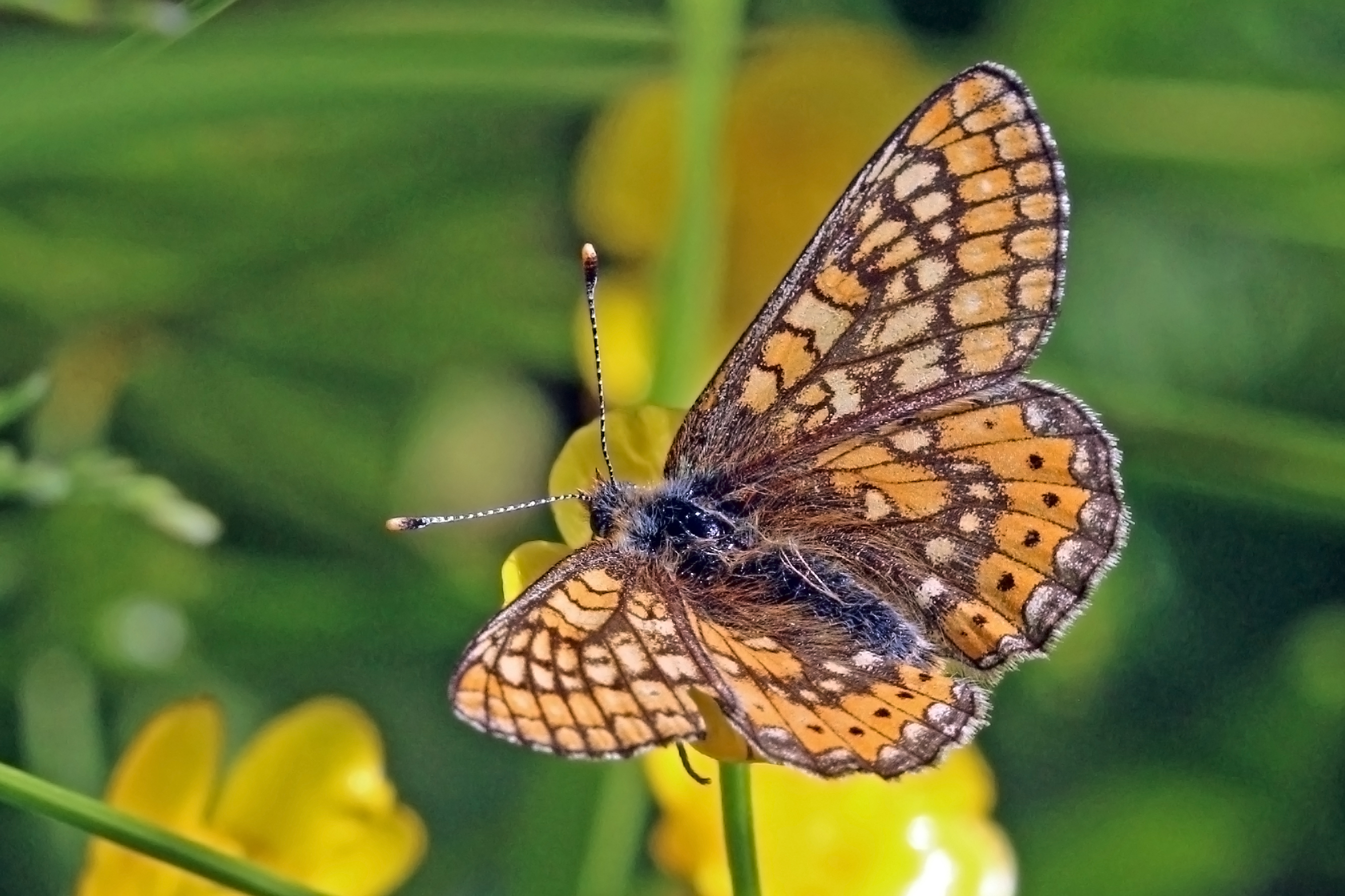
E. a. estonica, Estonia

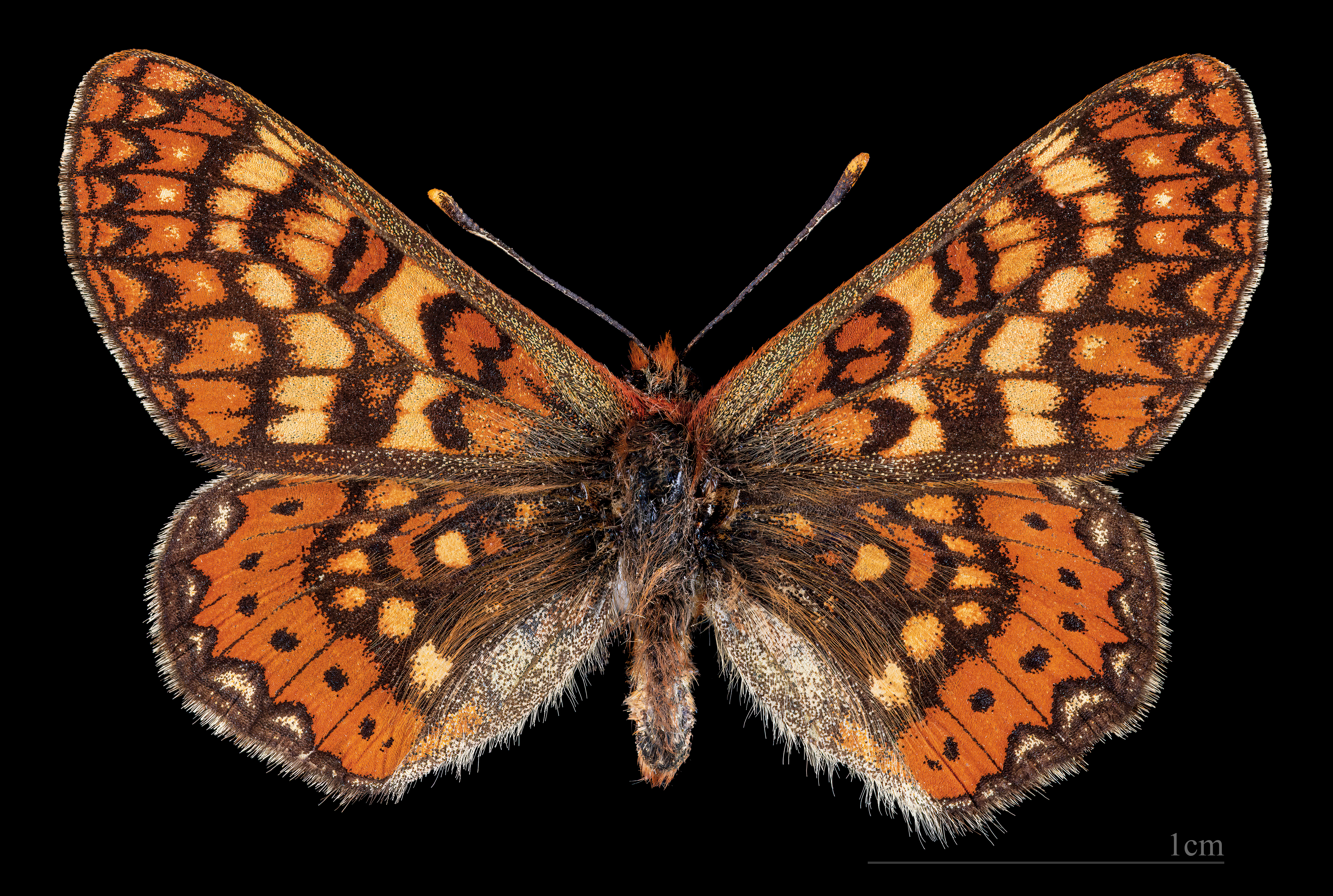
Euphydryas aurinia beckeri ♂

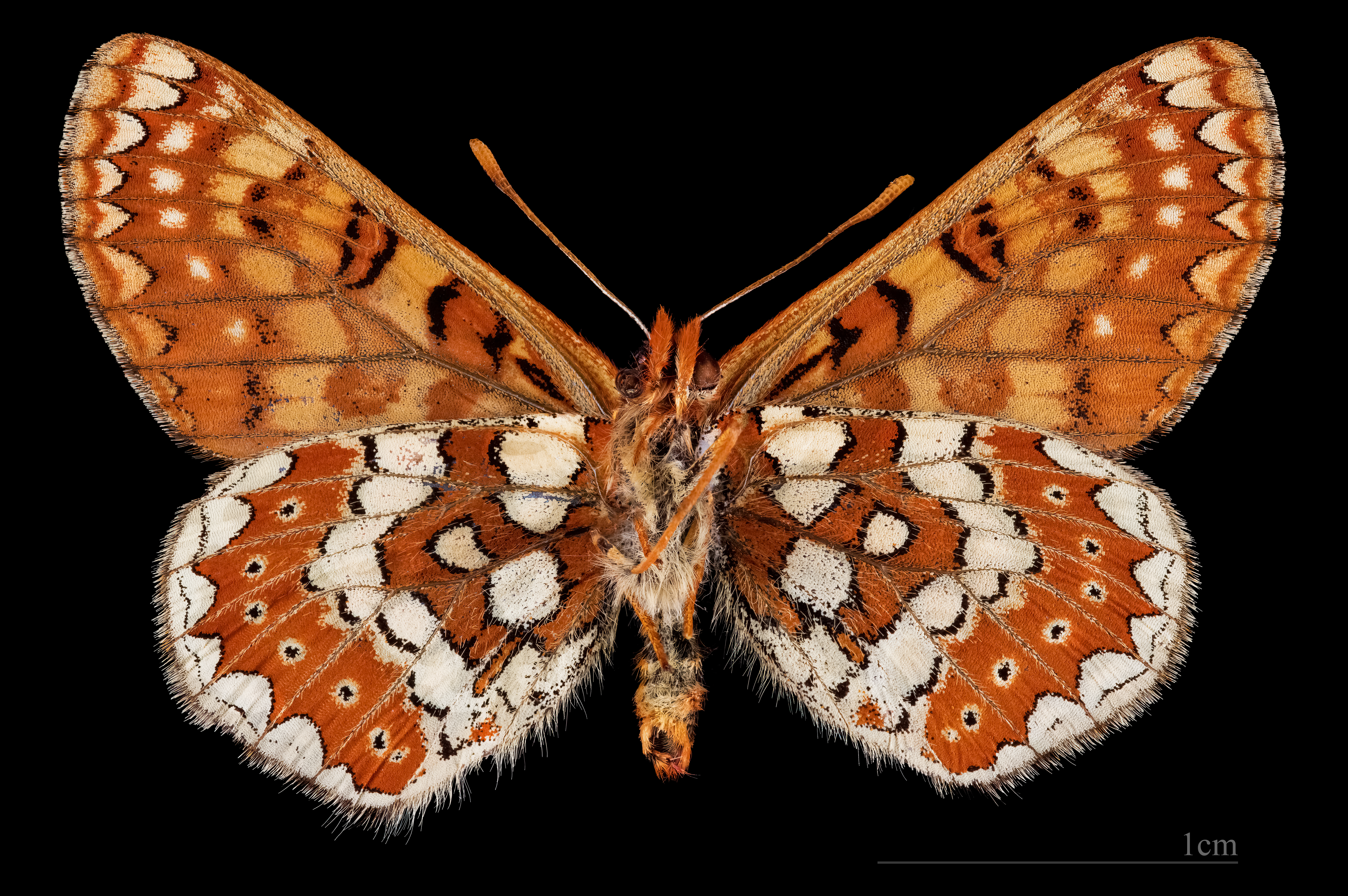
Euphydryas aurinia beckeri ♂ △

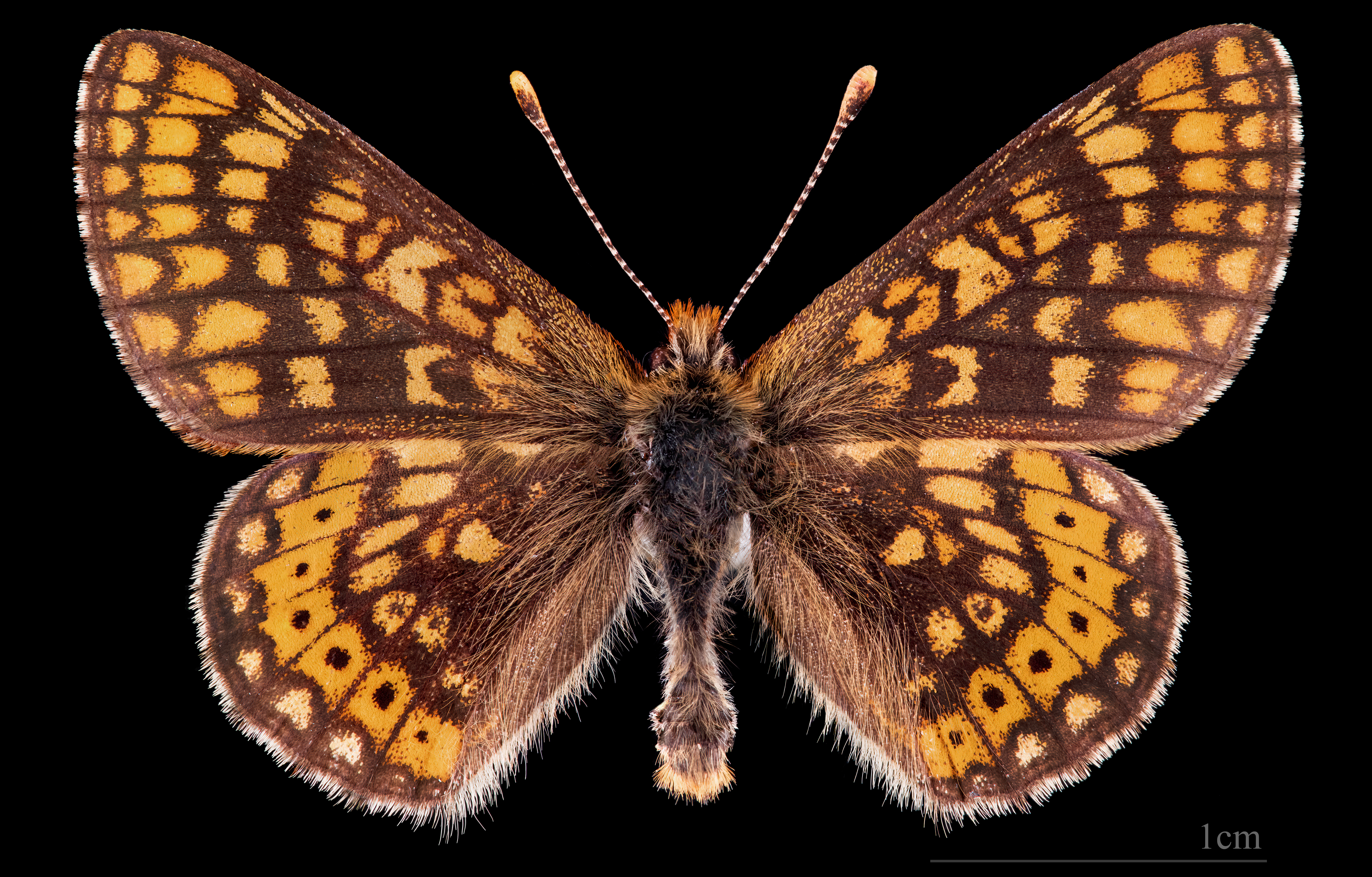
E. a. debilis ♂

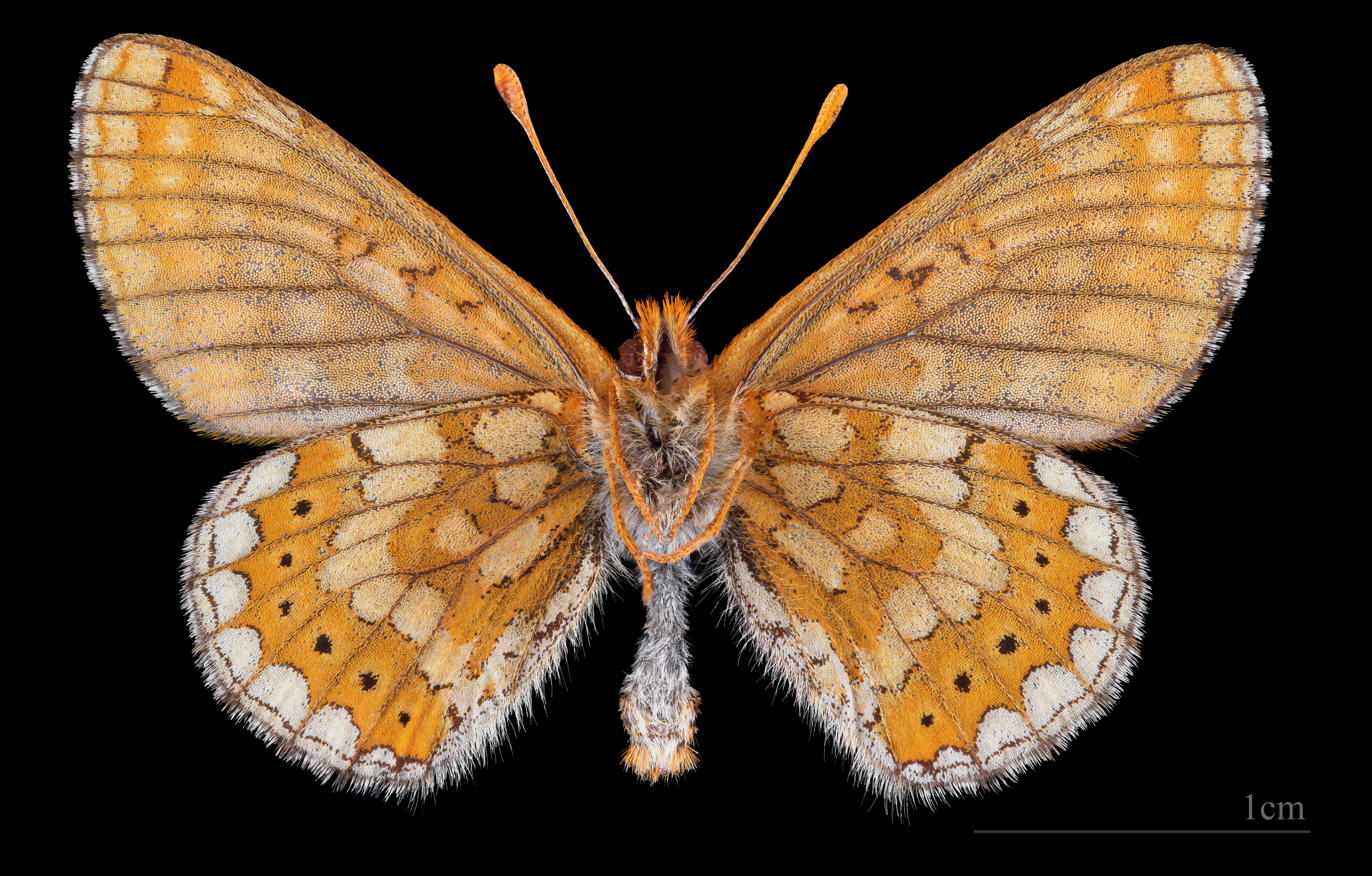
E. a. debilis ♂ △

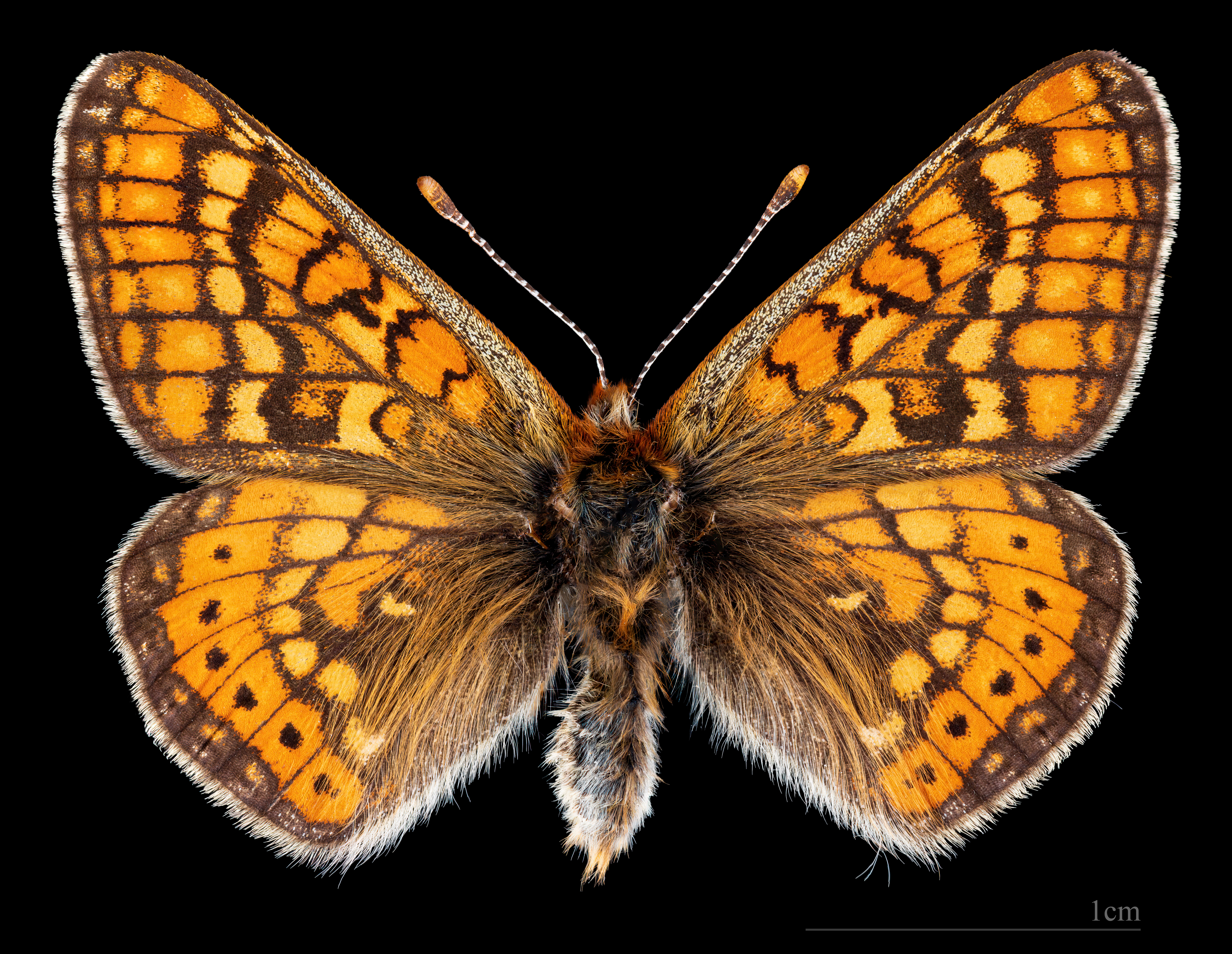
E. a. provincialis ♂

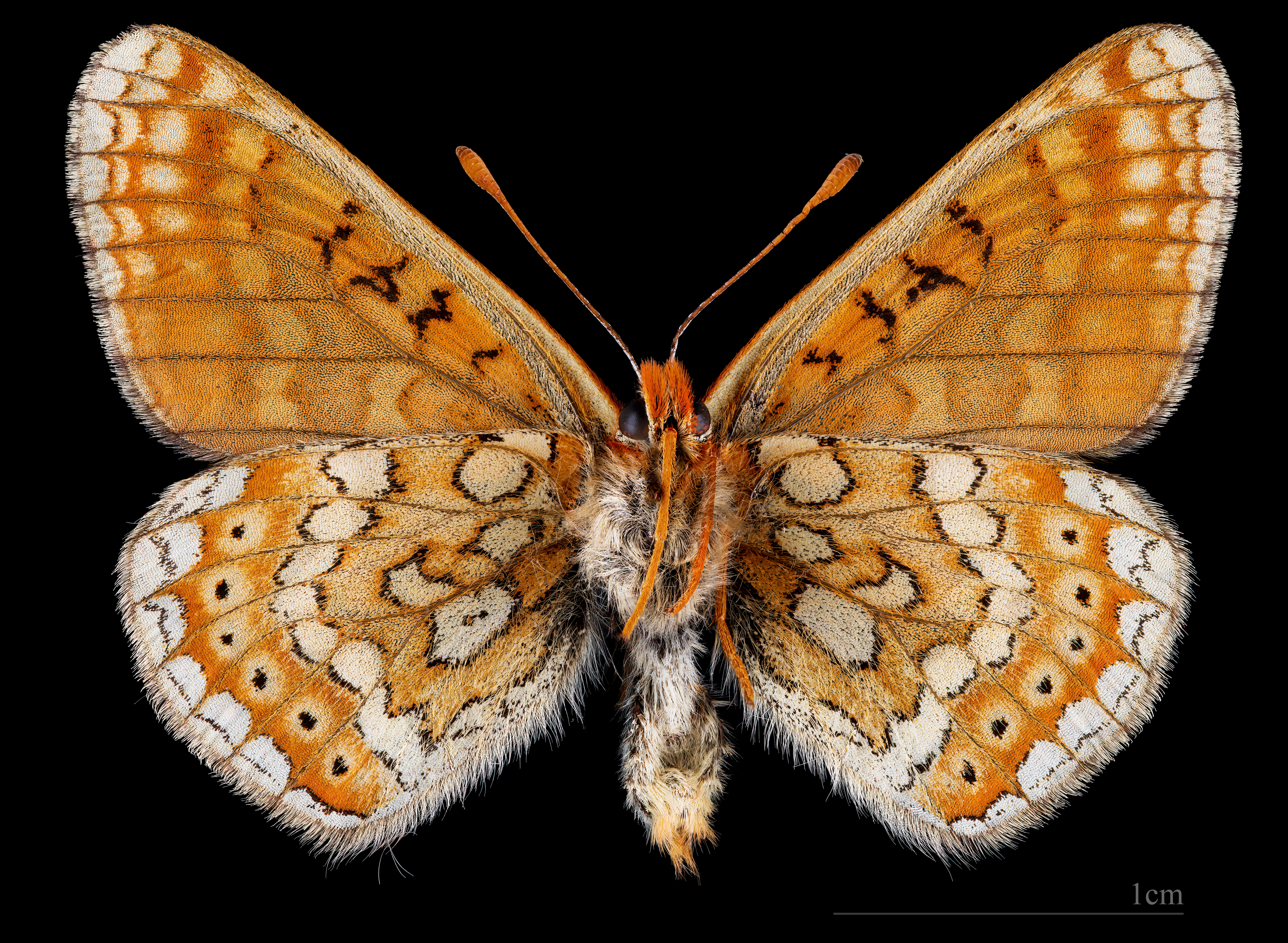
E. a. provincialis ♂ △

== Description ==
Euphydryas aurinia has a wingspan of 30–42 millimetres (1.2–1.7 in) in males. The females are usually larger than the males, with a wingspan of 40–50 millimetres (1.6–2.0 in). These small butterflies are variable in markings and colouration, with many forms and subspecies. The adult butterflies usually show a chequered pattern of brown, orange, and yellow markings. Silver markings are present on the hindwing edge. The underside of the wings is patterned with yellow, orange, and brown without any silver colouration at all. The eggs are yellow, and easily identified because of the large batch size. The larvae are black.

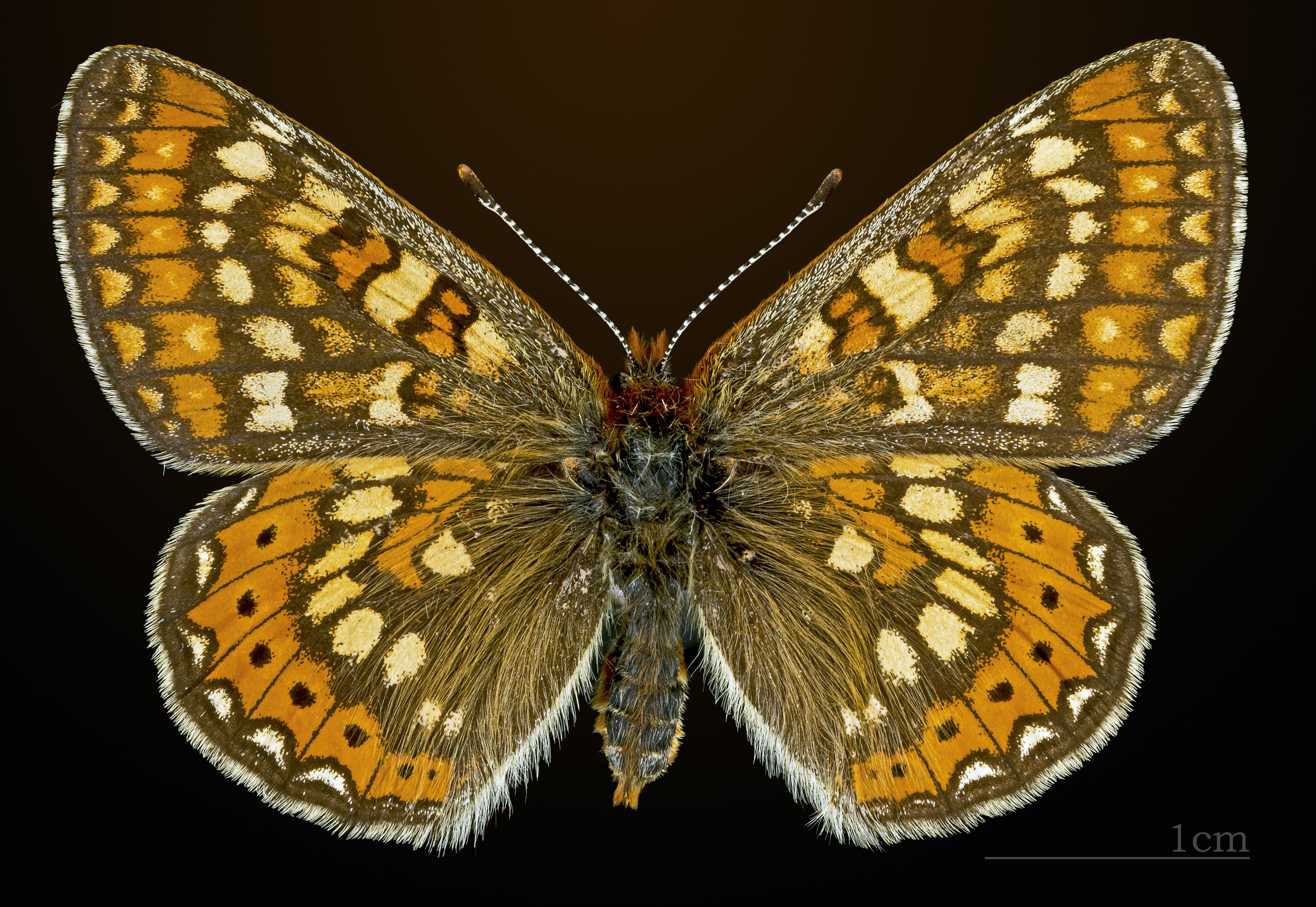
Dorsal side

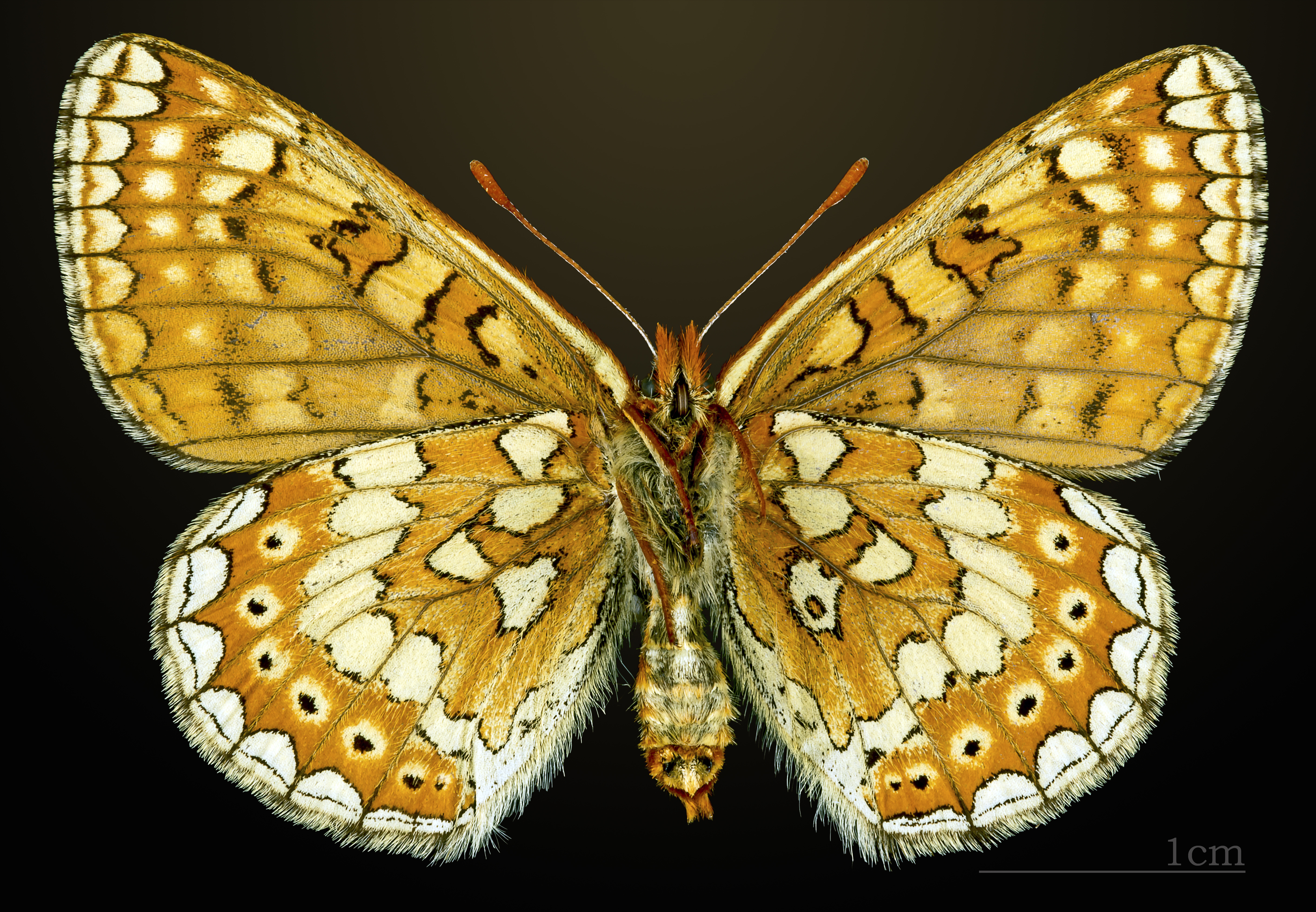
Ventral side

== Distribution and habitat ==
This species is widespread in the Palearctic realm, from Ireland in the west to Yakutia in the east, and to north-west China and Mongolia in the south. The marsh fritillary is in decline in Europe and it is one of eleven butterflies covered by the United Kingdom Biodiversity Action Plan. Within the British Isles, it is more frequent in the south and west, but especially in Wales where there is a stronghold.

This species lives in calcareous grassland, in woodland clearings, in damp marshy areas (hence the common name), and in heathy grassland, dominated by tussock forming grasses, including purple moor and rush pastures. In Finland, E. aurinia has been shown to favor semi-permanent grasslands and impermanent clearcuts in the forest. Young clearcuts were preferred over old clearcuts due to the dense growth of vegetation in old clearcut forests. In the United Kingdom, two types of grasslands can be inhabited by E. aurinia: damp grasslands that are either neutral or acidophilus and dry grasslands that have an abundance of plants growing in lime-rich soil (calcicolous grasslands). These butterflies can reach an elevation of 10–2,200 metres (33–7,218 ft) above sea level.

In the British Isles, the marsh fritillary is usually found in damp, heathy grasslands that are called rhos pastures, from the Welsh word rhos meaning heath. Small populations can be an important element of the ecology because they produce many mobile individuals which can then found other populations. The marsh fritillary is protected under UK law, listed under Schedule 5 of the Wildlife and Countryside Act, and the EU Habitats and Species Directive (Annex II). The Devon Wildlife Trust owns a number of sites at which it monitors this species. Examples include Stowford Moor (near Holsworthy, Devon), Dunsdon nature reserve (near Bude), Mambury Moor (near Great Torrington), Vealand Farm nature reserve (near Holsworthy), and Volehouse Nature Reserve (near Holsworthy). In 2009, population counts had significantly increased from years 2007 and 2008. In 2018, a breeding population was found in Carmarthenshire, Wales, after an absence of 50 years.

In Lithuania (included into the Lithuanian Red Data Book since 2000, red list category-3 (R))(Rašomavičius, 2007) is protected insect species. Euphydryas aurinia usually is found in natural and seminatural moist or wet oligotrophic grasslands (purple moorgrass and heath rush meadows), base rich fens, mostly in Eastern, North-Western and Central Lithuania, where its main foodplant Succisa pratensis (Dipsacaceae) is abundant. Inhabited patches frequently are situated along woodland edges or surrounded by bushes. Species is not found in Southern Lithuania where sandy soils predominate and in South-Western Lithuania where agriculture is very intensive.

In Croatia, it is only present in the north, and even those findings are only historical. Attempts to confirm its presence have failed, but northern Ivanščica and the Lobor valley are considered promising.

=== Factors for optimal habitat ===
The availability of larval food plant S. pratensis and grass height are the most important factors in providing an optimal habitat for E. aurinia.

==== Host plant availability ====
Because caterpillars live in communal webs formed around their host plant and hibernate through the winter inside the web, the density of host plant is a crucial factor in forming the habitat of E. aurinia. Studies have shown that the density of host plant is directly correlated to the number of larval webs found, which in turn is directly related to the number of adult butterflies. Therefore, a habitat suitable for the larvae can indirectly influence the proliferation of adult butterflies.

==== Sward height ====
Not only is the density of host plant crucial for a favorable habitat, but also the height of the sward, the expanse of grass covering the area where E. aurinia lives. Sward height that is too short can lead to increased exposure of the larvae to predators and can cause limited food availability, leading to starvation. However, if the sward height is too tall and densely packed, then it becomes difficult for adult butterflies to locate the host plant to oviposit on. Thus, the level of sward height is most optimal when it is medium height.

== Food resources ==
=== Host plant for caterpillars ===
The caterpillars are known to feed primarily on Succisa pratensis and species of Digitalis, Plantago lanceolata, Knautia arvensis, Scabiosa succisa, Scabiosa columbaria, Veronica (Veronica dubravnaya, etc.), Geranium, Sambucus, Gentiana, Valeriana, Lonicera implexa, Filipendula, Spiraea and Viburnum.

==== Methanol emission from feeding ====
One study measuring the level of volatiles released by plants that are consumed by herbivores has shown that huge amounts of methanol and other volatile substances (monoterpenes, sesquiterpenes and lipoxygenase-derived volatile compounds) are emitted by E. aurinia caterpillars feeding on the host plant S. pratensis. Methanol is a biochemically active compound that is commonly released by metabolic activities of anaerobic bacteria.

=== Adult feeding ===
Adult butterflies feed on nectar opportunistically, so the density of host plant S. pratensis does not affect adult butterfly feeding. In fact, by the time adult butterflies emerge, S. pratensis does not even flower. Adults are polyphagous and generally feed on Ranunculus ssp., Cirsium ssp., Leucantherum vulgare, Myosotis ssp., Rubus ssp most often. They have also been observed feeding on Caltha palustris, also known as kingcup or marsh-marigold, and Ajuga reptans, also known as bugle or bugleweed.

== Parental care ==
=== Oviposition discrimination ===
E. aurinia females are batch-layers, meaning they lay a large number of eggs at one site. Because 200–300 eggs are at stake every time an egg-laying site is chosen, batch-laying females tend to undergo a discrimination phase in searching for a location to lay eggs on. Each plant can serve as an egg-laying site for four to five clusters of eggs, meaning that more than a thousand larvae may hatch on a single plant. If so, the newly hatched larvae will face serious food shortage and fierce competition for food, which has huge repercussions for offspring survivorship. Therefore, Euphydryas and other batch-laying females, such as Melitaeini females, spend more time choosing a place to lay eggs and are more selective when looking for a host plant.

==== Size of host plant and vegetation density ====
Female oviposition depends largely on the size of host plant as well as density of vegetation cover. Studies have shown that females prefer to lay eggs on large host plants as opposed to smaller plants. This is to prevent food shortage and starvation of the larvae. Also, sparse, open vegetation structure is favored over dense, thick grasslands when the host plant S. pratensis is used for oviposition. The presence of a tall non-host plant (e.g. Deschampsia caespitosa) is negatively correlated with egg nests. Therefore, abandoned meadows with lime-rich soil have been identified as oviposition sites. Often, E. aurinia will lay eggs at edges of such meadows because the vegetation structure and plant height fit the female butterfly preference for oviposition. For such reasons, croplands are generally favored over meadows for oviposition because croplands tend to have concentrated numbers of large-sized host plants.

==== Color of host plant ====
Females prefer to lay eggs on leaves with the highest chlorophyll contents. Therefore, the reflectance and chlorophyll concentration of leaves also affects the choice of oviposition site for E. aurinia. Chlorophyll content (the "greenness" of plants) can be an indicator for increased fitness of the host plant, which in turn will provide optimal growth opportunities for the newly hatched larvae. Females therefore use visual cues to seek out the greenest leaves to lay their eggs on. However, there are also indications that it is not high chlorophyll concentration but the presence of conspecific egg clusters which attracts females to oviposit on a certain leaf.

==== Other favored factors for oviposition ====
In the Czech Republic, the presence of short grasses that can serve a cushion-like function (especially Nardus stricta) in the vicinity of the host plant was positively correlated with nest numbers. In general, conditions that promote host plant growth and proliferation are also favorable for nests. Dry, acidic conditions with limited nitrogen resources are preferred for nests because these conditions lead to short swards. Short swards facilitate larval basking, and thus is a factor considered by females during oviposition.

== Life cycle ==
Euphydryas aurinia is a univoltine species.

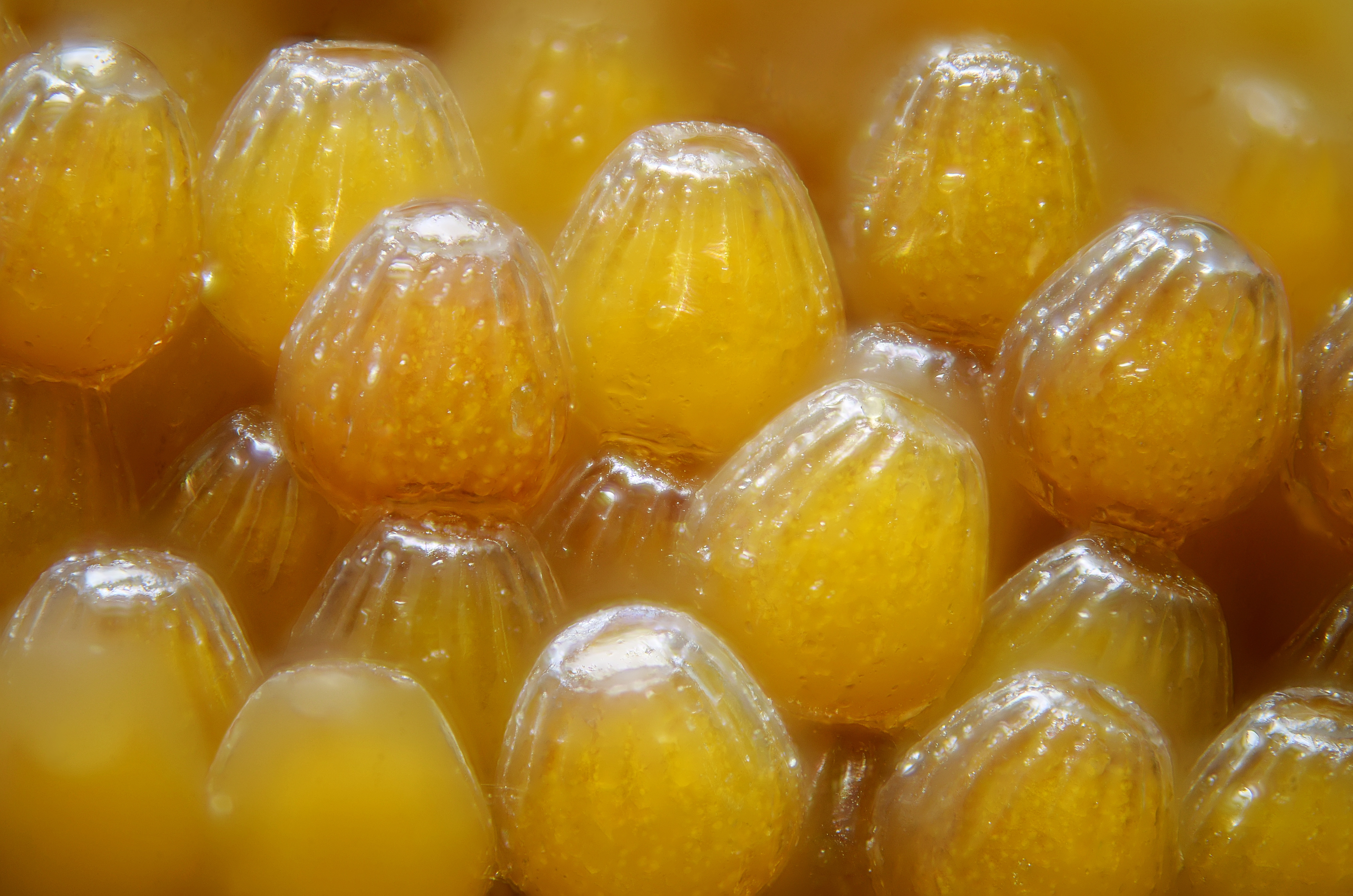
Eggs

=== Egg ===
The eggs are laid in groups on the underside of leaves in May and June. Up to 350 are laid in a single batch. They turn from pale yellow when first laid, to bright yellow, then crimson, and finally to dark grey just prior to hatching.

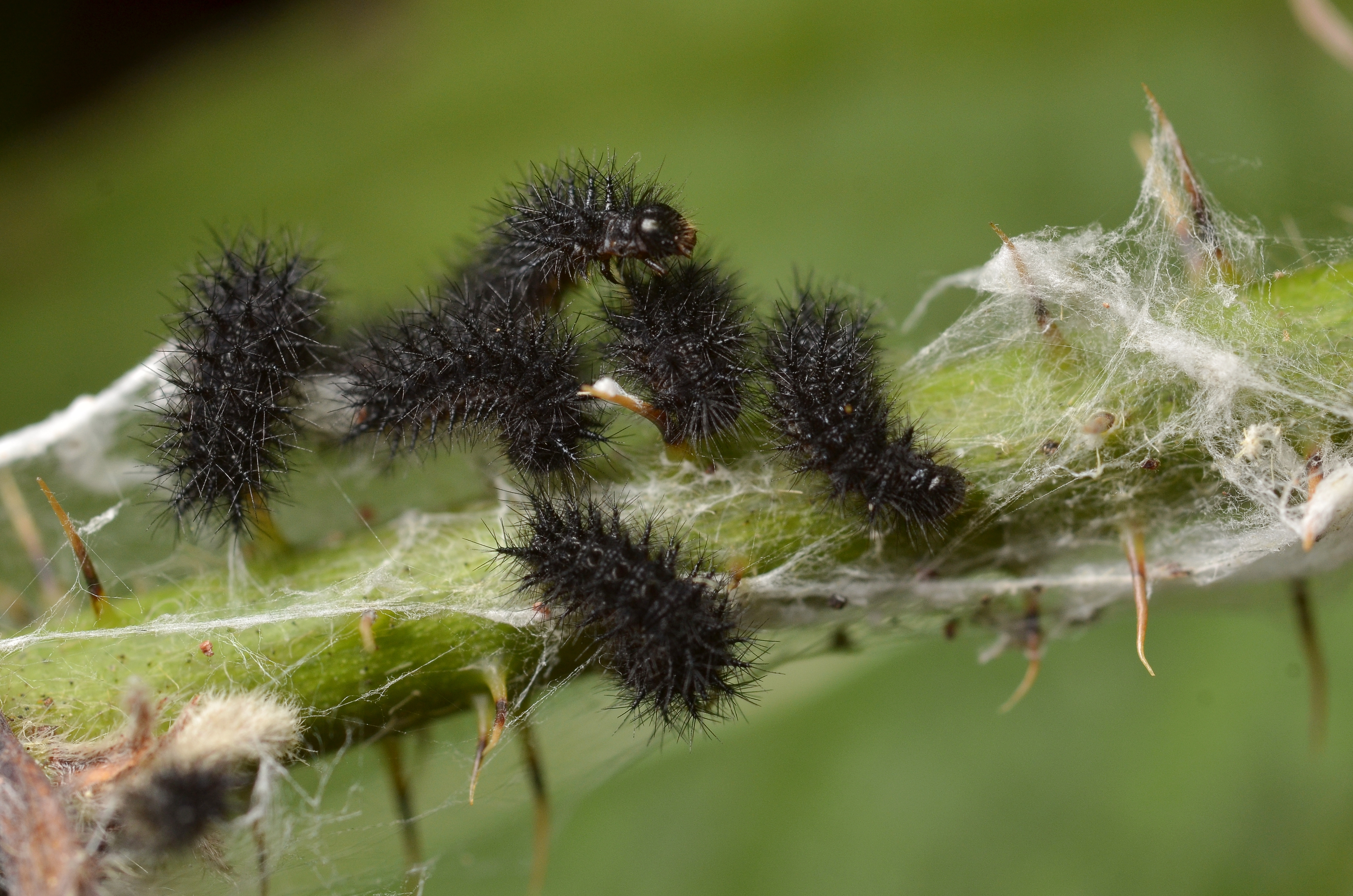
Young caterpillars

=== Caterpillar ===
The caterpillars hatch in about three weeks from the end of June onwards. There are six instars for E. aurinia larvae. The first four are gregarious, the first three being prehibernation instars and the fourth being post-hibernation. The first three instars form a communal web around the food plant S. pratensis and feed on the host plant for about three weeks. The young caterpillars become conspicuous by the end of August. In the autumn, they make stronger webs closer to the ground, usually within a dense grass tussock, where they will start to hibernate.

In the spring, the fourth instar emerges from hibernation. All three of the post-hibernation instars bask in the sun. Basking is a behavior in which the instar increases its body temperature using heat from solar radiation. This allows them to be relatively independent of ambient temperature, which promotes faster development. During this time, they change color from brown to black.

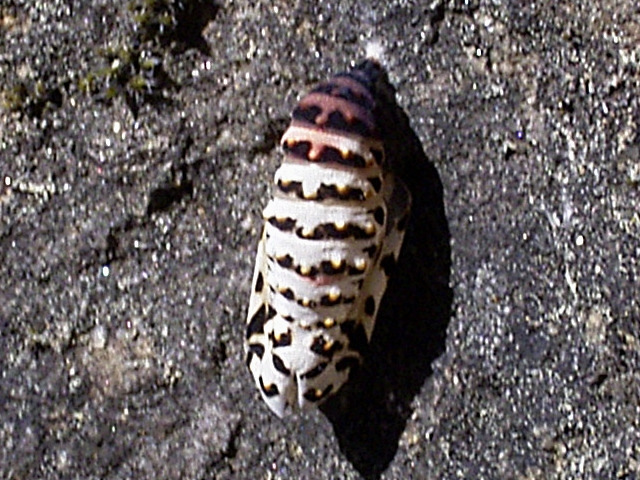
Pupa

=== Pupa ===
At the end of the sixth instar, pupae start forming. This occurs in the spring, around the end of March or beginning of April. Pupation occurs low down deep within grass tussocks or dead leaves.

=== Adult ===
Adults emerge and undergo the flight period between May and June. However, in southern regions, they can be on wing starting from late May. Adults have short life spans, usually lasting about two weeks.

== Migration ==
=== Metapopulations ===
Research on the population dynamics of the marsh fritillary has shown that they live in metapopulations. A metapopulation is defined as a collection of local populations that are connected together as a result of occasional dispersal. Amongst these some will disappear and others will be founded. An important feature of metapopulations is that there will always be empty habitat within the system. It is possible for the majority of the habitat patches to be empty. The security of suitable places where the butterfly does not presently inhabit is essential to its survival in the long term.

=== Local dispersal ===
E. aurinia butterflies tend to exhibit sedentary behavior, which leads to an increase in local dispersal rather than regional or long-distance dispersal. Males are more likely to emigrate than females, and even so, E. aurinia rarely move to neighboring patches. The average local population size increases as a result of the limited mobility of adult butterflies. Thus, the fluctuation of one habitat patch population size is unlikely to affect the population size of another habitat patch. The relative turnover rate of extinction and recolonization of previously empty habitat patches is high for E. aurinia, which indicates that extinction of one local population can be balanced by re-colonization of another. Such classic metapopulation characteristics explain why there is greater within-population genetic structuring in E. aurinia.

== Mating ==
Mating is believed to occur randomly, as shown by the fact that there is no significant deviation from the Hardy-Weinberg equilibrium in E. aurinia populations. Adult males display sedentary behavior, perching on bushes or grass. They observe and seek out females. Females mate once in their short lifetime and lay multiple batches of eggs. Due to their short lifetime, females mate soon after they emerge from chrysalis. They bear so many eggs that they are unable to fly far distances until they lay the eggs and only crawl to nearby vegetation. Females are larger and less vibrant in color than males.

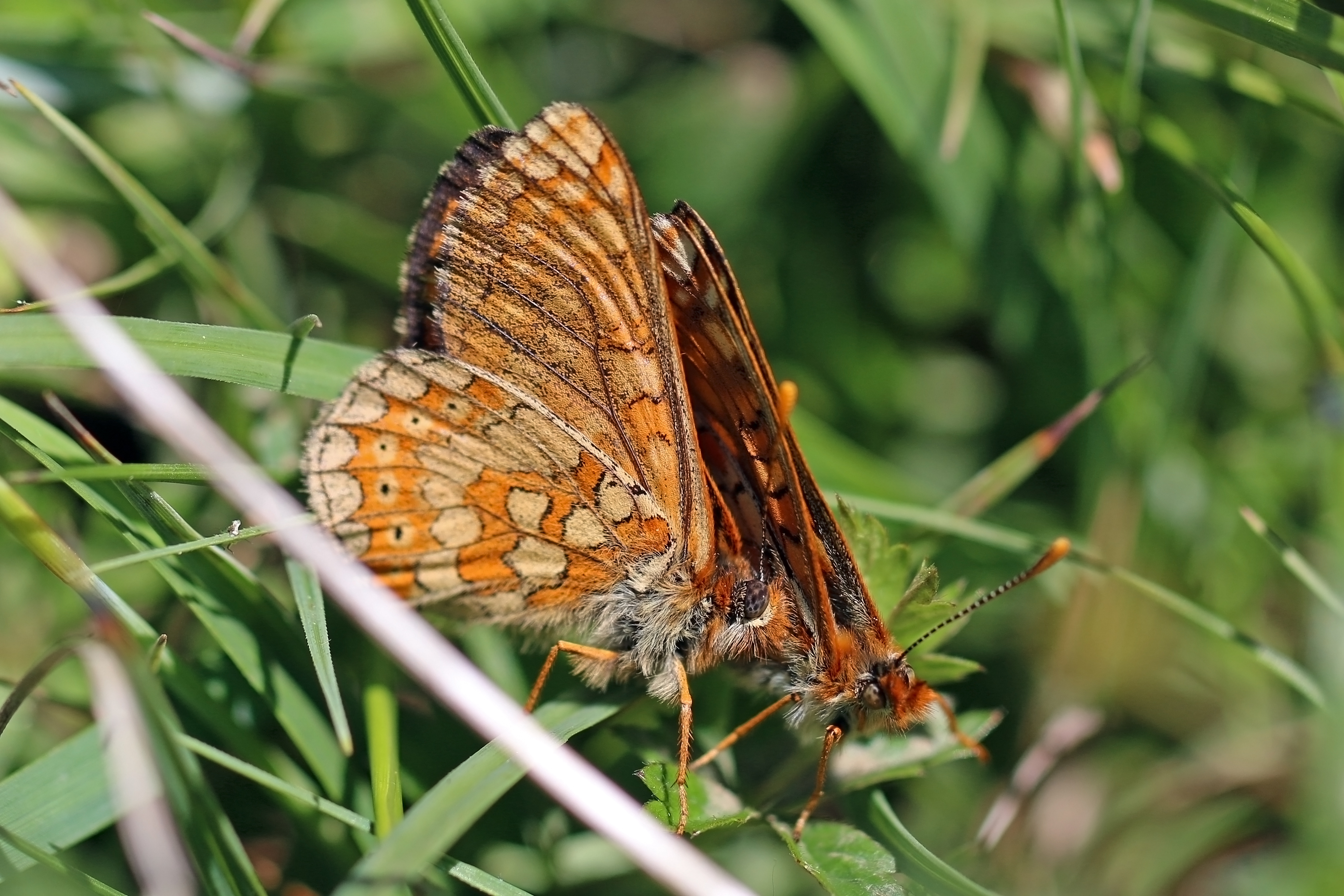
Courting

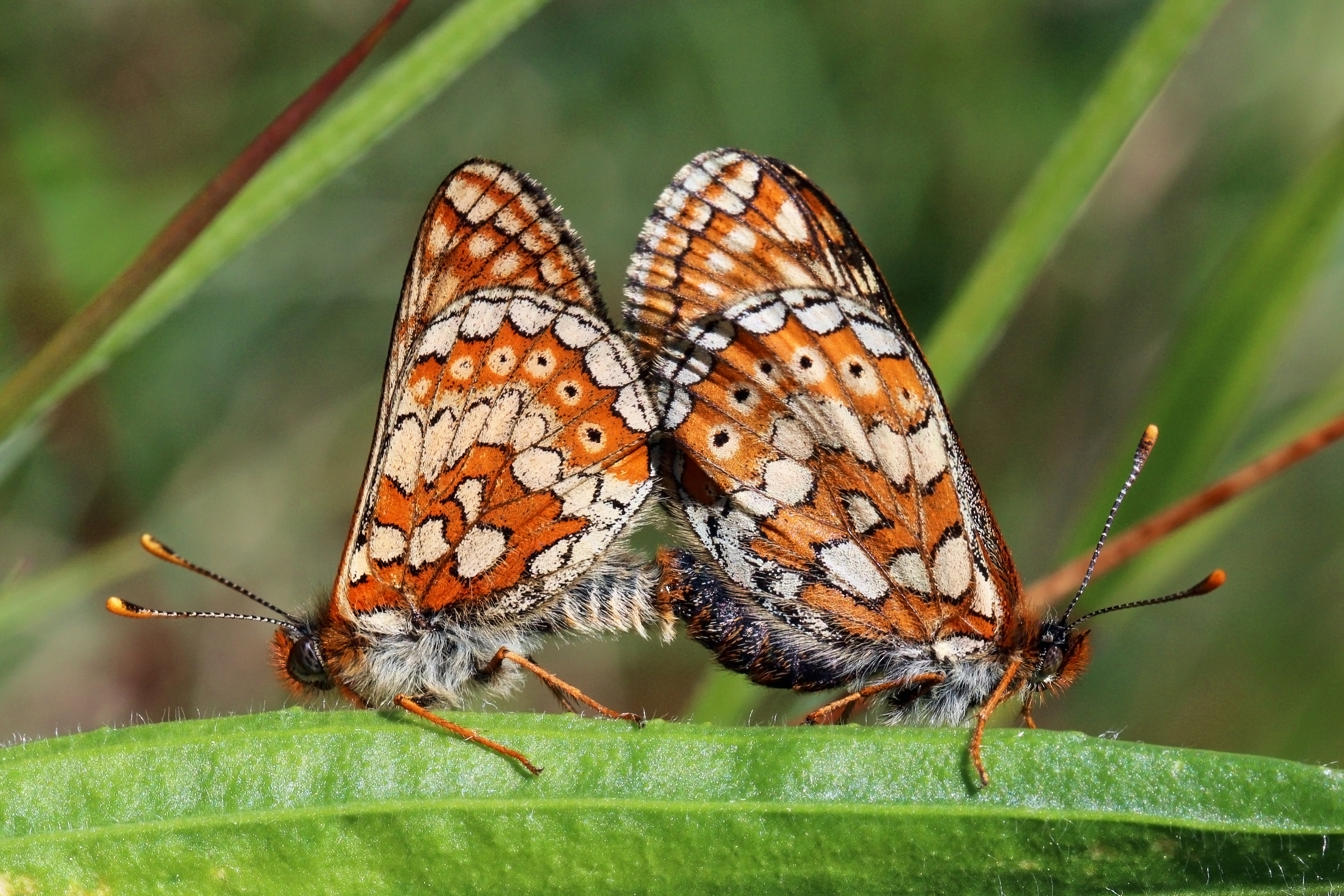
Mating

== Enemies ==
Known predators of E. aurinia are cuckoos, frogs, and toads, and the ground beetle Pterostichus versicolor. All of these predators prey on the larvae. The caterpillars are liable to be attacked by the parasitoid wasp Apanteles bignellii, especially in warm spring weather. The parasitoid displays gregarious parasitoid larval behavior, meaning more than one parasitoid progeny can develop fully in or on the host. In fact, three regular generations of A. bignelli occur in one generation of E. aurinia, usually between the pupae, adult, and egg stages of the host. Also, parasitoid oviposition behavior is selective, meaning that A. bignelli is a specialist parasitoid. The percent of host population parasitized varies greatly, ranging from 0 to 80%.

== Symbiosis ==
Endosymbiotic bacteria Wolbachia have been detected in 19 United Kingdom populations at 100% prevalence. When tested for phenotypes such as cytoplasmic incompatibility, sex ratio distortion, mutualistic or neutral relationship, there seemed to be no conclusive phenotype of the endosymbiotic bacteria. Although strains closely matched to the identified Wolbachia bacteria strain were shown to be sex ratio distorters, no sex ratio distortion was observed in the E. aurinia populations. Therefore, further research needs to be done to conclude what the phenotype of this symbiotic bacteria is. Possible explanation for the stable sex ratio in E. aurinia despite the presence of Wolbachia may be the evolution of traits in the host that suppress the Wolbachia phenotype from being expressed. If this is the case, then the apparent lack of phenotype of the Wolbachia bacteria can be explained as phenotype suppression.

== Conservation ==
As of 2021 the butterfly's conservation status is globally considered of least concern by the International Union for Conservation of Nature and Natural Resources. However, several areas report regional decreases in population.

=== Fluctuations of the population ===
Major fluctuations of local patch populations of E. aurinia have been reported in western England, with the population number reaching peaks in the 1890s and mid 1920s at population sizes around 40,000 and 1,000 respectively. Despite the massive number of larvae and pupae observed during these two periods of maximal population growth, the population frequency of E. aurinia fluctuated drastically as the number of caterpillars observed dropped as low as 16 caterpillars in 1920 after a "diligent search". Thus, E. aurinia serves as a good indicator of environmental changes due to its vulnerability to habitat changes.

=== Habitat loss ===
Short film on the Marsh Fritillary by Natural Resources Wales

As of 2017, rapid decline of the population had been observed in Denmark due to loss of habitat and host plants.

Because the larval stage is highly dependent on the host food plant S. pratensis, decline in the availability of the host plant leads to negative effects on the E. aurinia population. Decline of natural habitats for S. pratensis is correlated with decline in the host plant population. Due to cultivation and shift of land use from traditional farming to grazing, the frequency of S. pratensis populations has declined over the past few years. Damp, basic soil is suitable for high S. pratensis frequency. Environmental changes such as acidification and eutrophication have led to a decline in available optimal habitat for S. pratensis, and consequently for E. aurinia.

As of 2019 the butterfly had become regionally extinct over much of its former range in the UK. The population size in the UK had decreased by 60% over the period during which records have been kept. Human activities such as modern farming altered their main habitat – England's damp meadows – and have changed the climate as well. This loss of major habitats has led to fragmentation and isolation of E. aurinia populations, thus leading to metapopulation formation. E. aurinia is more vulnerable to extinction in the small subpopulations that comprise the metapopulation.

According to the Joint Nature Conservation Committee in 2019, the population has "declined dramatically in Europe and is regarded as endangered or vulnerable in most of its European range," and the remaining populations in the UK and Spain are considered the "European strongholds" for the species.

== Management ==
Moderate farming activity can be beneficial to the E. aurinia population because it can lead to sparsely-vegetated, open landscape which is suitable for E. aurinia larvae. Research has shown that the female butterflies prefer to lay their eggs in cropland over meadows. This can be explained by the fact that vegetation is less dense and the host plants tend to be larger in size on cropland. However, excessive landscape changes that come with modern farming techniques can lead to drastic changes in the E. aurinia population. There have been efforts made to re-introduce butterflies into empty patches of habitat to increase re-colonization, and techniques such as controlled burns and cattle grazing have also been utilized to promote E. aurinia population growth. These areas are monitored for indicators of success such as the frequency of larval webs and the frequency of flowers and larval food plant.

=== Grazing ===
Cattle grazing is a common method which has been adopted in response to the declining E. aurinia population. An intermediate level of grazing can help maintain moist grasslands, which are optimal for S. pratensis and E. aurinia. However, overgrazing can lead to short host plants, which can lead to shortage of food for the newly hatched larvae. Under-grazing can lead to growth of dense, scrubby plants, which is also unsuitable and unfavored by the female butterflies. The aim is to produce an uneven patchwork of short and long vegetation by the end of the grazing period, between 8 and 25 cm.

=== Swaling ===
Another common method for conservation efforts is swaling, which is a form of land management where controlled burning is used to prevent overgrowth of vegetation and promote wildlife biodiversity. Though it is a temporary solution, swaling can provide suitable habitat conditions for E. aurinia. Criticism against swaling include the fact that it is only a temporary solution, and the possibility that swaling can kill masses of E. aurinia larvae if done at the wrong time of the year.

=== Re-introduction of butterflies ===
Lastly, in extreme cases, efforts to re-introduce E. aurinia butterflies into empty patches of habitat have been attempted in order to increase the colonization rate. Because this method involves extreme human intervention to promote patch population formation, this method is also a temporary fix and used only in rare, extreme cases of local extinction.

== Bibliography ==
- Aldwell, B. and Smyth, F. 2013. The Marsh Fritillary (Euphydryas aurinia (Rottemburg, 1775)) (Lepidoptera: Nymphalidae) in Co. Donegal. Irish Naturalists' Journal 32: 53–63 Crory, Andrew.(?) 2016. Fritillary Butterflies. The Irish Hare, Issue: 113. p. 4
