= Jacques Raphael Finlay =

Canadian fur trader, scout, and explorer

Jacques Raphaël Finlay
- Born: 1768; Finlay Fort, near Nipawin Rapids, Saskatchewan River, Canada
- Died: 1828 (aged 59–60); Spokane House, Oregon Country
- Burial place: Beneath the Old Bastion, Spokane House, Oregon Country
- Other name: Jaco or Jacco
- Occupations: Fur trader, scout, and explorer
- Parent: John Finlay

Jacques Raphaël Finlay (1768–1828), commonly known as Jaco or Jacco (pr. Jocko), was an early Canadian fur trader, scout, and explorer associated with the North West Company. He built Spokane House and Kootanae House, two key fur-trading posts of the era, and helped David Thompson cross the Continental Divide and discover the Columbia River.

== Biography ==
Finlay was born in 1768 on the south bank of the Saskatchewan River. His mother came from the Chippewa tribe of Native Americans, but never married his father, James Finlay, a North West Company trader who had a family in Montreal.

Finlay was recorded as a clerk of the North West Company as early as 1799; this was the highest office accorded to "half-breeds" in that era. Finlay was compensated, however, as much as David Thompson, the English-born explorer, probably reflecting his reputation as a scout.

Thompson accordingly engaged Finlay in 1806 to blaze a trail through the Rocky Mountains across the Continental Divide; Thompson followed in 1807, though he was markedly unhappy with the quality of the trail, which led at least as far as Howse Pass. Finlay also played a key advance role in Thompson's discovery (from the East) of the Columbia River, scouting, storing provisions, and building canoes.

After Thompson returned east, Finlay found work with the Pacific Fur Company (a surviving receipt shows him to have been literate). He later returned to the employ of the North West Company when the latter purchased the assets of the former during the War of 1812, and remained an employee until 1816, along with three of his sons. He later took over a defunct Hudson's Bay Company post, where botanist David Douglas recorded a visit in 1826, as well as a recipe for bread made from local lichens.

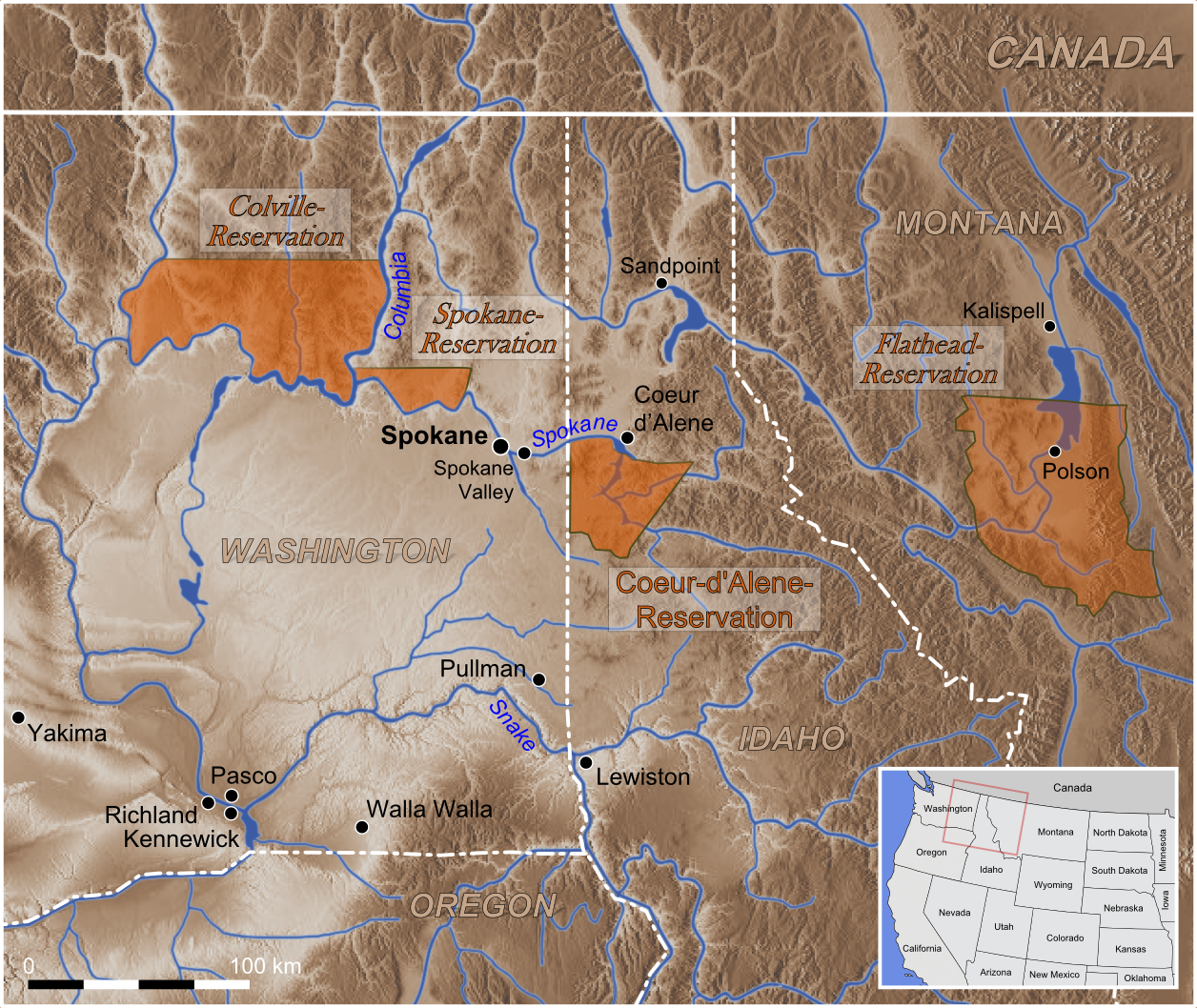
Spokane area Indian Reservations.

He died in 1828, and was buried on the grounds of Spokane House. According to Nathaniel Jarvis Wyeth, who passed by the abandoned site in 1833, all the buildings had been burned for firewood but one, which was maintained out of respect for a dead clerk buried beneath it. In 1950, a construction crew discovered what became the archaeological site, and Finlay's body was found with items including a clay pipe marked "JF".

His descendants can be found throughout the Northwest, especially on the Flathead, Colville, Spokane, Kalispel, Coeur D'Alene, and Umpqua Indian Reservations. An early settler, Jacob Allen Meyers (J.A. Meyers) wrote in the early 20th century –

"Jacques Finlay had a large family of sons and daughters, noted for their fine physique, many with light blue eyes. The men in the family were competent and trustworthy. The daughters were fine wives and mothers."

== Legacy ==
The Jocko Valley and the Jocko River in Montana are named for him.

== See also ==
- Biography at the Dictionary of Canadian Biography Online
- JACQUES RAPHAEL FINLAY, In the Pacific Northwest before 1808, by Chalk Courchane
- Spokane House Interpretive Center
