= Crimson lake =

Crimson lake may refer to:

- Crimson lake, pigment of a bright-red color
- Crimson Lake (Alberta), lake in Alberta, Canada
- Crimson Lake Provincial Park, provincial park located in Alberta, Canada

== See also ==
- Carmine (disambiguation)
