= Spokane House =

Coordinates: 47°47′17″N 117°31′53″W

- Fur Trade Outpost
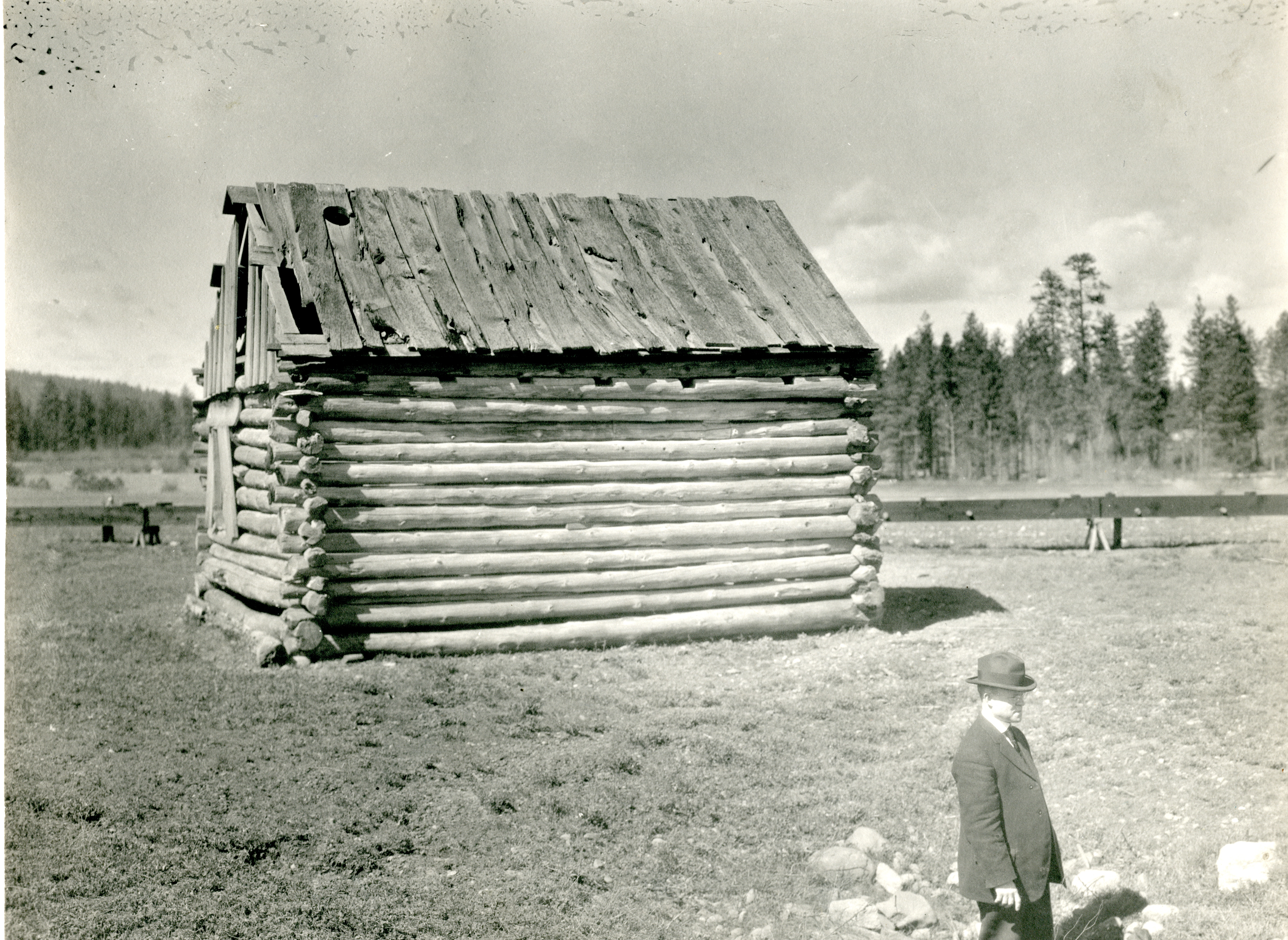
- Log structure at Spokane House
- Constructed: 1810
- Company built: North West Company
- Location: Nine Mile Falls, Washington
- Continent: North America
- Later Ownership: 1821, Hudson's Bay Company
- Abandoned: 1826

Spokane House was a fur-trading post founded in 1810 by the British-Canadian North West Company, located on a peninsula where the Spokane River and Little Spokane River meet. When established, the North West Company's furthest outpost in the Columbia River region was the first ever non-Indigenous settlement in the Pacific Northwest (South of present-day 49 degree latitude border). Prior to the arrival of the white traders, the site of what would become Spokane House was a gathering place for area tribes who came to catch and dry salmon, which contributed to its development as a trading post.

An American rival of the NWC, the Pacific Fur Company opened a station adjacent to Spokane House, called Fort Spokane. The War of 1812 and ongoing supply issues resulted in the collapse of the PFC, with its posts now under the control of the NWC. The original Spokane House was abandoned in favor of Fort Spokane, though the latter location was still called Spokane House. The second Spokane House saw use as a major post in the interior Oregon Country until the NWC was absorbed by the Hudson's Bay Company in 1821.

During a general tour of the Pacific Northwest, Spokane House was abandoned by George Simpson in 1825, in favor of a new post that became Fort Colvile. The site of Spokane House is in Spokane County in the U.S. state of Washington, just northwest of the city of Spokane in the community of Nine Mile Falls.

== North West Company ==
Spokane House was created under direction of David Thompson and built by Jaco Finlay during the winter of 1810–1811. Finlay remained among the Sqeliz until Thompson's return in 1811. Visiting the station in June 1811, Thompson noted that Spokane House was the place "where I left a small assortment of Goods to continue the trade, there were forty Tents of Spokane Indians, with Jaco, a half breed, as Clerk." Thompson soon departed for the mouth of the Columbia River, discovering the rival Fort Astoria.

== Pacific Fur Company ==
Fort Spokane was a competing station opened by the Pacific Fur Company, a venture headquartered at Fort Astoria and funded by John Jacob Astor. The arrival of an expedition originating in St. Louis led by W. Price Hunt along with sorely needed supplies and reinforcements from the Beaver early in 1812 allowed the company to establish more trade posts to compete against the NWC. Among the various parties directed to leave Fort Astoria for the interior was an outfit headed by John Clarke. This party was directed to create "a district headquarters for trade in what is now eastern Washington and Oregon, northern Idaho, and western Montana." This group was directed to open a station in proximity to the Spokane House. The chosen location was approximately one-eighth of a mile from the original Spokane House on the same flat between the Spokane and Little Spokane Rivers.

Relations with the neighboring Sqeliz were peaceable, with the post gate often left open at night. Illim-Spokanee, the father of Spokane Garry, would trade with both fur company posts. Despite being competitors, talks with NWC employees at Spokane House were amicable. McMillan agreed to join Clarke in not selling alcohol to the natives. Parties of traders were supplied to trade with neighboring Indigenous nations in an effort to counter the NWC. François Pillet led a party of six to reside with the Ktunaxa to oppose the Kootanae House and Russel Farnham commanded a group of men to near Saleesh House in the Bitterroot Salish homeland. Leaving Farnham's group, Ross returned to the post shortly before 1 January 1813. The PFC laborers had as Ross recalled:

"a snug and commodious dwelling-house, containing four rooms and a kitchen; together with a comfortable house for the men, and a capacious store for the furs and trading goods; the whole surrounded by paling, and flanked by two bastions with loopholes for musketry.

When the Astorian wintering parties returned in early May, departure for Fort Astoria was set for 25 May 1813. The majority of the PFC laborers were in this party, with four men under Pillet left at Fort Spokane. Reaching Fort Astoria in August, the group learned the unfortunate news of the War of 1812 and consensus to sell the PFC assets, including Fort Spokane, to the NWC.

== NWC hegemony ==
Operations based at Spokane House were relocated to Fort Spokane, though the PFC station took the NWC station's name. It became the North West Company's central depot in the Oregon Country interior, but problems with the location of Spokane House were evident. Spokane House was poorly connected to other posts and reliant upon transport by large pack trains, rather than being able to use water transport. This made the company dependent upon the Nez Perce for a supply of horses. During this annual transportation of trade goods to Spokane House, thirty-five to forty men were employed by the NWC. Despite several proposals to abandon Spokane House, it remained popular among company employees. Fort Nez Percés was ranked as the main interior post in 1818.

== Hudson's Bay Company ==
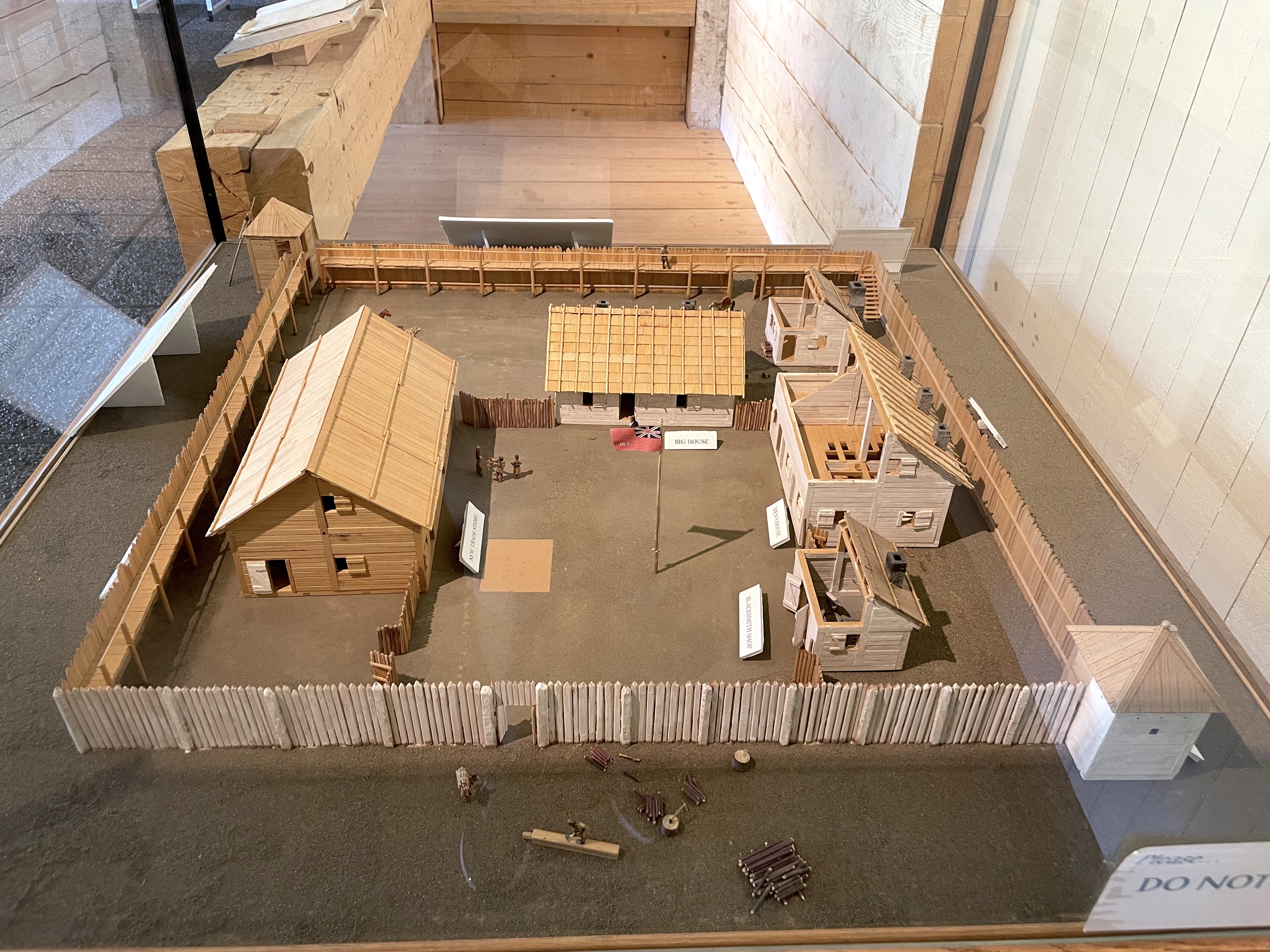
Model reconstruction of the HBC Spokane House

The Hudson's Bay Company took over control of the NWC in 1821 and sent George Simpson to tour the new western possessions of the HBC throughout 1824 and 1825. He visited the station accompanied by John McLoughlin, McMillian, and Peter Skene Ogden late in October 1824. Many of laborers that worked at Spokane House and its subsidiary stations of the Flathead Post and Kootanae House did not receive favorable reviews by Simpson. In particular he found many lazy, "the very scum of the country... the most unruly and troublesome gang... are under no control & feel their own independence, they therefore require very superior management to make anything of them..." Simpson reduced the employees stationed at Spokane House for 1825 by seven, leaving only fifteen.

Simpson returned to the station in April 1825. He began discussions with the Spokane House management to abandon Spokane House in favor of the Kettle Falls. This was due to several reasons including, the distance of Spokane House from the Columbia River, the scarcity of fur bearing populations in the area, and the abundance of fish and promising agricultural prospects at the latter location. That year work began near Kettle Falls on a new fur post, Fort Colvile.

== Later history ==
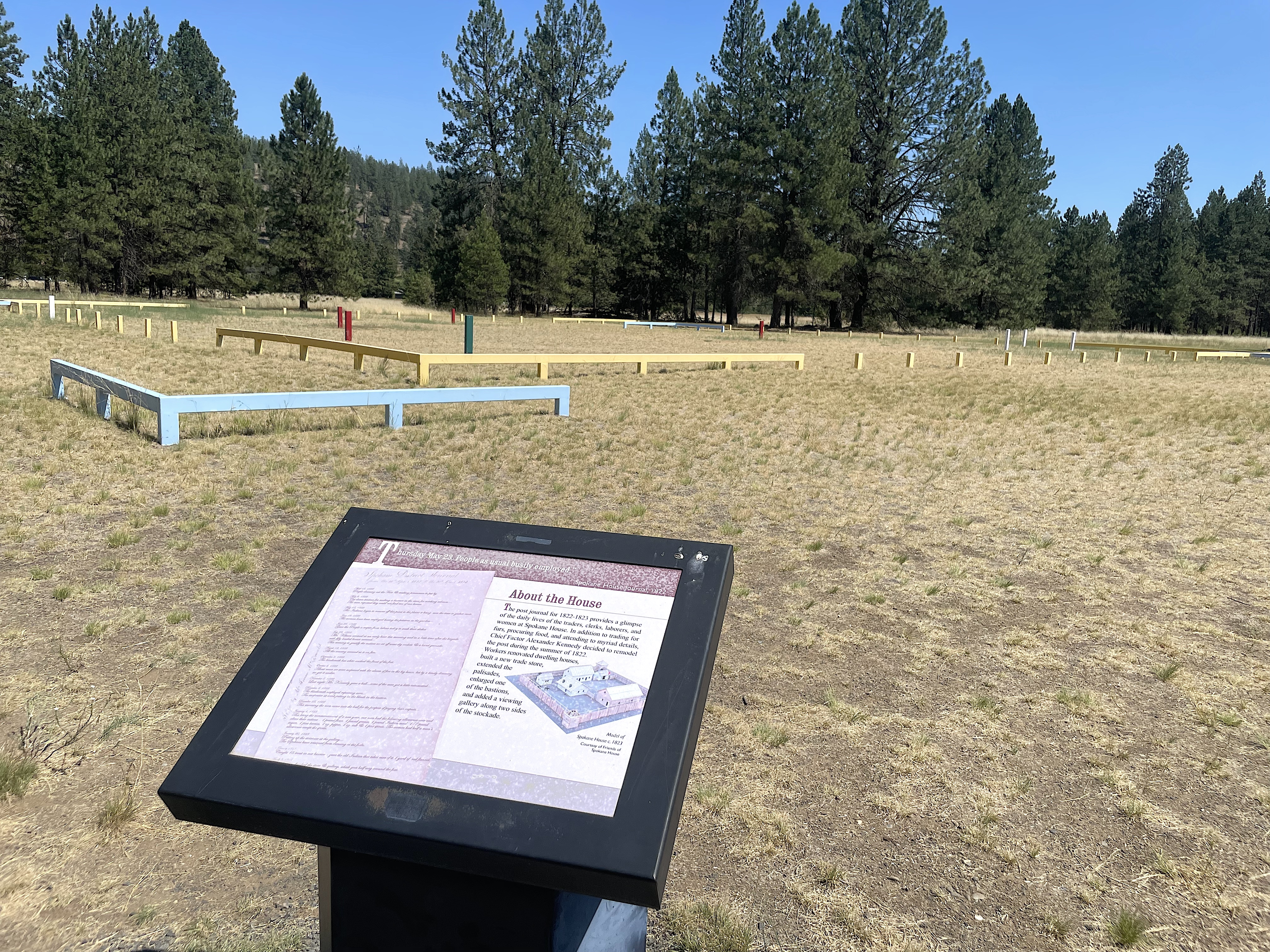
Area found during archaeological digs

In 1846 by the Oregon Treaty, the United Kingdom of Great Britain and Ireland ceded all claims to lands in the Pacific Northwest south of the 49th parallel to the United States.

Archaeological digs were carried out at the Spokane House site in 1950–1953 and 1962–1963. The historic district was defined and added to the National Register of Historic Places in 1988.

== Geography ==
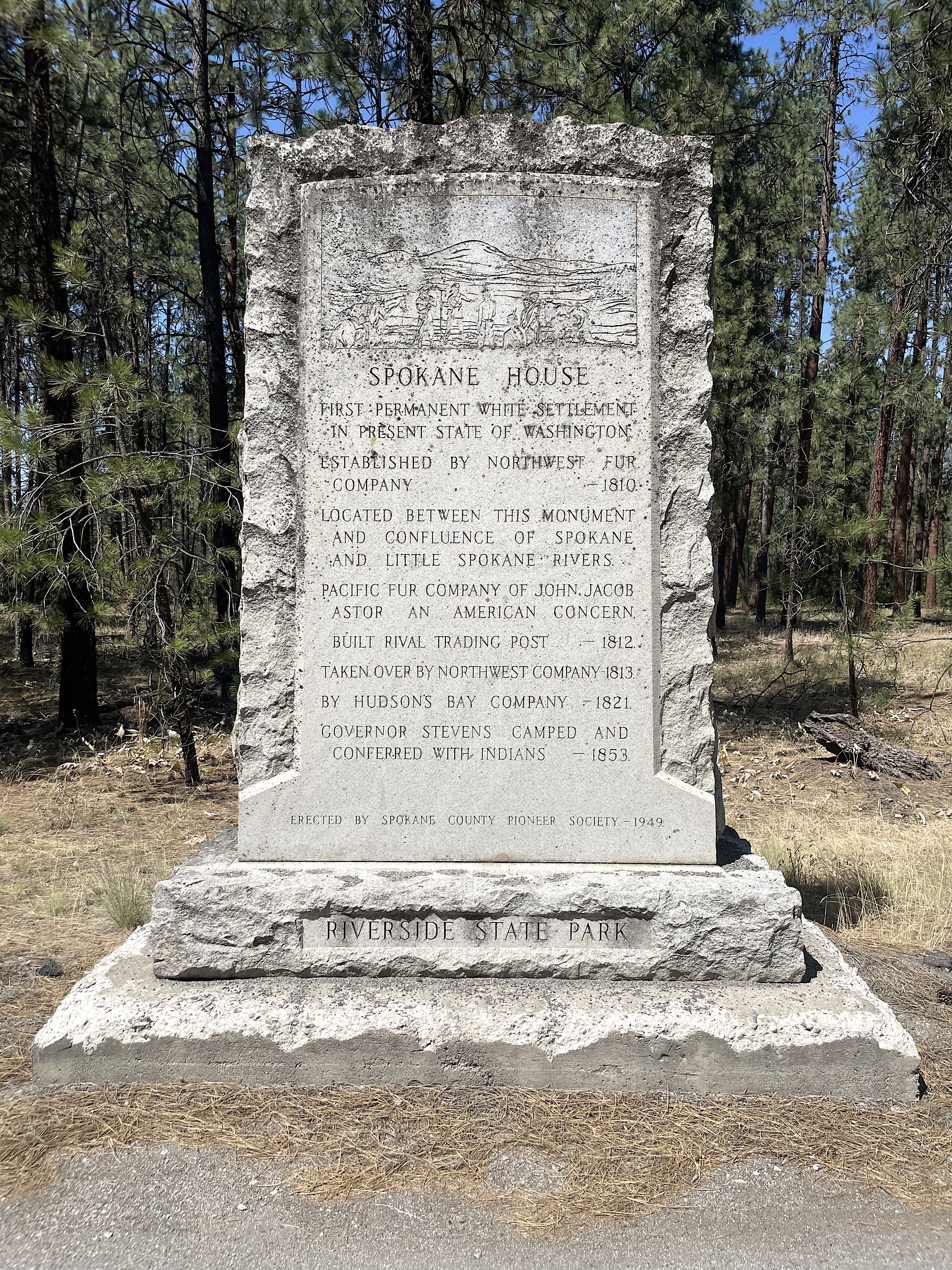
Monument at Spokane House

Spokane House was located on a flat peninsula between the Spokane River to the west and the Little Spokane River to the east with the two rivers coming together at the northern end of the peninsula. The flat is approximately 1,550 feet above sea level, but the surrounding terrain is quite rugged. Mountains rise immediately to the northeast of the Little Spokane to heights of 3,100 feet at a distance of two miles. A steep bluff is located to the south of the flat where the Spokane River tumbles over Nine Mile Falls.

The historical site is located within Riverside State Park, approximately one-half mile from the community of Nine Mile Falls. Washington State Route 291 connects the site with Nine Mile Falls and the much larger city of Spokane. The Spokane House Interpretive Center is located on the site.

=== Historical climate (1896-1899) ===
Climate data for Fort Spokane, Washington
Month	Jan	Feb	Mar	Apr	May	Jun	Jul	Aug	Sep	Oct	Nov	Dec	Year
Record high °F (°C)	52 (11)	59 (15)	65 (18)	84 (29)	95 (35)	100 (38)	107 (42)	109 (43)	97 (36)	77 (25)	71 (22)	50 (10)	109 (43)
Mean daily maximum °F (°C)	32.9 (0.5)	39.7 (4.3)	49.6 (9.8)	62.3 (16.8)	68.9 (20.5)	77.5 (25.3)	88.3 (31.3)	91.1 (32.8)	75.9 (24.4)	61.6 (16.4)	39.9 (4.4)	33.3 (0.7)	60.1 (15.6)
Mean daily minimum °F (°C)	17.5 (−8.1)	21.3 (−5.9)	24.0 (−4.4)	34.9 (1.6)	41.5 (5.3)	46.7 (8.2)	50.0 (10.0)	50.8 (10.4)	41.2 (5.1)	30.1 (−1.1)	22.8 (−5.1)	18.1 (−7.7)	33.2 (0.7)
Record low °F (°C)	−28 (−33)	−24 (−31)	3 (−16)	19 (−7)	26 (−3)	32 (0)	39 (4)	36 (2)	27 (−3)	13 (−11)	−25 (−32)	−8 (−22)	−28 (−33)
Average precipitation inches (mm)	2.73 (69)	1.01 (26)	0.54 (14)	1.16 (29)	1.90 (48)	1.19 (30)	1.52 (39)	0.97 (25)	0.79 (20)	0.47 (12)	3.54 (90)	2.11 (54)	17.93 (456)
Average snowfall inches (cm)	20.6 (52)	7.4 (19)	3.7 (9.4)	0.0 (0.0)	0.0 (0.0)	0.0 (0.0)	0.0 (0.0)	0.0 (0.0)	0.0 (0.0)	0.0 (0.0)	20.0 (51)	14.3 (36)	66 (167.4)
