= Rocky Mountain House =

- Town
- Town of Rocky Mountain House
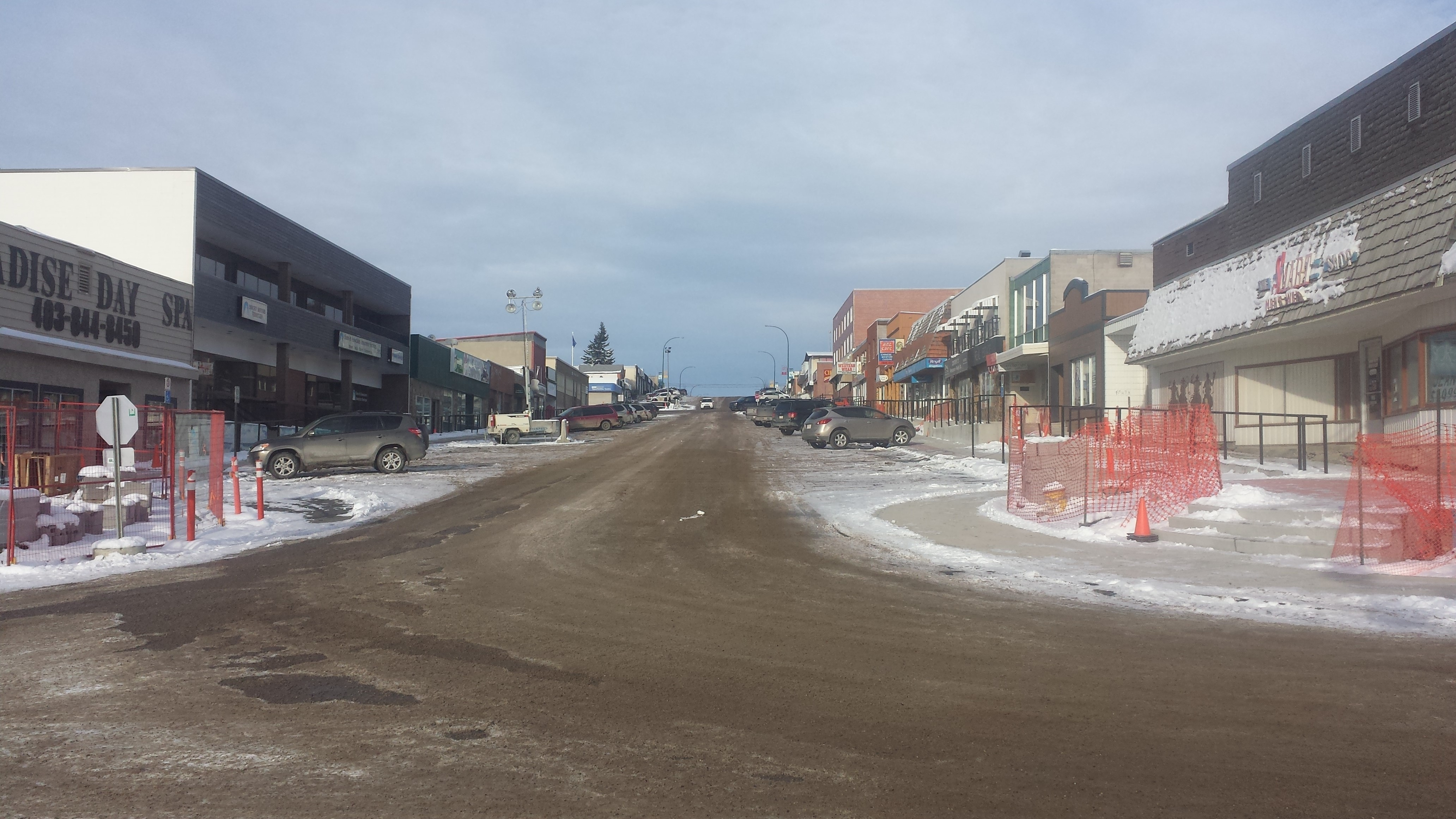
- Downtown Rocky Mountain House (2014)

- Coat of arms

- Location in Clearwater County

- Location of Rocky Mountain House Rocky Mountain House (Canada)
- Coordinates: 52°22′31″N 114°55′18″W
- Country: Canada
- Province: Alberta
- Region: Central Alberta
- Census division: 9
- Municipal district: Clearwater County
- Founded: 1799
- Incorporated
  - Village: May 15, 1913
  - Town: August 31, 1939

Government
  - Mayor: Shane Boniface
  - Governing body: Rocky Mountain House Town Council
  - MP: William Stevenson
  - MLA: Jason Nixon

Area (2021)
  - Land: 13.05 km^{2} (5.04 sq mi)
- Elevation: 985 m (3,232 ft)

Population (2021)
  - Total: 6,765
  - Density: 518.3/km^{2} (1,342/sq mi)
- Time zone: UTC−06:00 (Alberta Time)
- Forward sortation area: T4T
- Area code: 403 / 587 / 368 / 825
- Highways: Highway 11; Highway 11A; Highway 22; Highway 598; Highway 752
- Waterways: North Saskatchewan River, Clearwater River
- Website: Official website

Rocky Mountain House is a town in west-central Alberta, Canada. It is approximately 77 km (48 mi) west of Red Deer at the confluence of the Clearwater and North Saskatchewan Rivers, and at the crossroads of Highway 22 (Cowboy Trail) and Highway 11 (David Thompson Highway). The surrounding Clearwater County's administration office is located in Rocky Mountain House.

== History ==
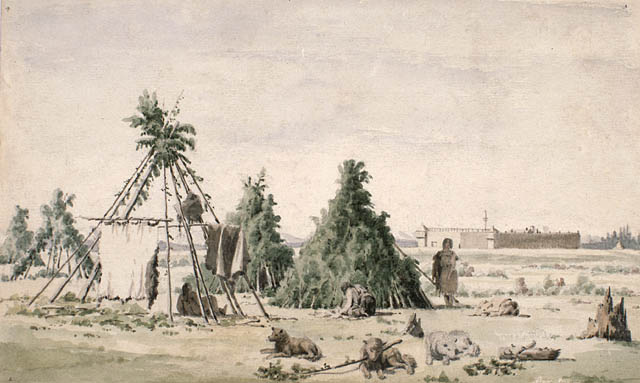
Rocky Mountain Fort in 1848 by Paul Kane

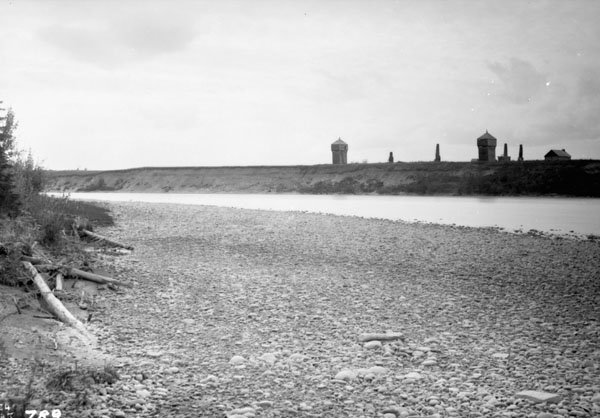
Ruins of Rocky Mountain House in 1884 (photo by James Williams Tyrrell)

The town has a long history dating to the 18th century with the presence of British and Canadian fur traders during the westward Canadian expansion. In 1799, the Hudson's Bay Company and the North West Company each established the Rocky Mountain House and Acton House fur trading posts. Trade with the local aboriginal peoples continued until 1821 when the companies merged, they continued to trade until 1875 and closed the Rocky Mountain House post. The name of the settlement however remained.

The Rocky Mountain House settlement also served as a launching point for many explorers such as David Thompson, in search for a passage west to the Pacific Ocean. Many travellers used this location as a stop on their way further west or northwest, just as they do into the 21st century.

The next wave of adventurers entered the region at the beginning of the 20th century in search of opportunities presented by lush farmland and the abundance of coal and other natural resources. Rocky Mountain House became a firmly established town by 1912. Settlers of Scandinavian origin made up a significant part of early 20th century settlement in the region. In 1941 an explosion at the Brazeau Collieries Mine killed 29.

The town was hit by a magnitude 5.0 earthquake on October 20, 2021, just after 9:20pm MDT. It was the second-strongest earthquake in the province's history.

=== Fur trade ===
Rocky Mountain House and Acton House were a pair of fur trade posts from 1799 to 1876. Rocky Mountain House belonged to the North West Company (NWC) and Acton House to the Hudson's Bay Company (HBC). When the two companies merged in 1821, the name Rocky Mountain House was retained. The posts were opened and closed seven times.

Rocky Mountain House was the westernmost post on the North Saskatchewan and was within sight of the Rocky Mountains. The fort facilitated trade with the Blackfeet and Piegans as well as the Kootenays across the mountains. The Kootenays were prevented from reaching Fort Edmonton by the Blackfeet and Piegans who wanted to profit as middlemen and keep them from getting guns. The fort also served as a base for finding a pass across the Rocky Mountains. The post also produced pemmican and York boats.

The posts were built at the confluence of the Clearwater River and the North Saskatchewan River. They were on the north bank just above the Clearwater and strongly built for protection from the Blackfeet. During low water there were rapids near the post. Around 1980, only two stone chimneys were standing. An interpretive centre was subsequently developed at this location.

Timeline

- 1790: Peter Pangman of the North West Company marked the site for the future company fort.
- 1799–1802: In September 1799, a group of Nor'Westers (North West Company employees) under John McDonald of Garth travelled upstream of Fort Augustus by canoe and horseback and established Rocky Mountain House. James Bird of the HBC followed and built Acton House. David Thompson and Duncan McGillivray of the NWC were wintering partners at their House. The Kootenays did not cross the mountains in significant numbers and attempts to find a pass failed. Therefore, both posts were closed in 1802.
- 1805–1807: The two posts were reopened without much success. In 1807, David Thompson of the NWC went up the North Saskatchewan, found Howse Pass and built Kootenay House on the Columbia River. The new post made Rocky Mountain House unnecessary and the posts were closed again in 1807.
- 1810–1812: Reopened in 1810, Alexander Henry 'The Younger' of the NWC found that the route over the mountains was blockaded by the Piegans. He and David Thompson set out overland north to the Athabasca River. After ascending it for five days, they abandoned their horses for snowshoes to cross Athabasca Pass for the first time and reached the Columbia River at Boat Encampment. Athabasca Pass was clearly superior and attempts to reach the Columbia shifted north. In 1811, a group of Gros Ventres planned to attack the fort but were threatened away by the Piegans who preferred to trade at Rocky Mountain House rather than at Fort Edmonton near their Cree enemies. The two posts were then closed to consolidate trade at Fort Edmonton.
- 1819–1823: Attempts to get the Blackfeet to trade at Fort Edmonton failed so the forts were reopened. With John Rowland in charge for the NWC, the two companies were merged in 1821 and the combined fort was called Rocky Mountain House. In 1823, George Simpson decided to close the post since there were few beaver and the post was losing money.
- 1825–1832: The post was reopened at Piegan request, and it prospered due to a new source of beaver. In the winter of 1830–31, a group of Piegans were attacked by the Crows, who killed 57 Piegans and stole all their furs. After this disaster and the opening of a closer American post, the Piegans stopped trading and the post was closed again in 1832.
- 1835–1861: A new post was built to the south somewhere on the Bow River in the Piegan country, which failed after two years. In 1835, J. E. Harriott built a new post down the river but in sight of the old post, where it remained as a wintering post for 26 years. The Piegan trade having been lost to the Americans, the HBC tried to concentrate the Blackfoot trade at Rocky Mountain House away from their enemies at Fort Edmonton. With the escalating violence on the frontier, the HBC decided to stop the liquor trade. In retaliation, the Blackfeet refused to trade and prevented buffalo hunters from leaving the fort. With starvation a real possibility, no one was sent upriver in the fall of 1861 to trade. Finding the fort empty, the Blackfeet burnt it to the ground.
- 1864–1876: Gold was discovered in Montana and the American traders shifted their attention from Indians to prospectors. The HBC reasoned that this made a new opportunity for the Indian trade and a new Rocky Mountain House was built next to the ruins of the old one. The trade did not prosper because the Blackfeet preferred the Americans' whiskey which they got from places like Fort Whoop-up. Arriving in 1874, the North-West Mounted Police drove out the American whiskey traders, and the HBC built a new post somewhere to the south making Rocky Mountain House redundant. It was closed permanently in 1876.

== Geography ==
The North Saskatchewan River borders Rocky Mountain House to the west where the Clearwater River flows into the North Saskatchewan River.

Crimson Lake is a lake approximately 17 km (11 mi) northwest of town. Crimson Lake is home to Crimson Lake Provincial Park.

=== Climate ===
Rocky Mountain House has a subarctic climate (Köppen climate classification Dfc) that borders on a humid continental climate (Köppen Dfb). Daytime temperatures are in general representative for the latter, but the larger diurnal temperature variation with the high elevation ensures frequent frosts. The January average high of around −4 °C (25 °F) is actually much milder than clear continental areas further east in Canada on similar and lower parallels.

The highest temperature ever recorded in Rocky Mountain House was 35.0 °C (95 °F) on 23 July 1928. The coldest temperature ever recorded was −55.6 °C (−68 °F) on 12 February 1936.

Climate data for Rocky Mountain House Airport, 1981–2010 normals, extremes 1915–present
Month	Jan	Feb	Mar	Apr	May	Jun	Jul	Aug	Sep	Oct	Nov	Dec	Year
Record high °C (°F)	15.7 (60.3)	19.0 (66.2)	22.5 (72.5)	27.8 (82.0)	34.4 (93.9)	33.9 (93.0)	35.0 (95.0)	32.8 (91.0)	32.8 (91.0)	30.6 (87.1)	23.3 (73.9)	17.8 (64.0)	35.0 (95.0)
Mean daily maximum °C (°F)	−3.3 (26.1)	−1.5 (29.3)	3.2 (37.8)	10.8 (51.4)	16.2 (61.2)	19.3 (66.7)	21.1 (70.0)	21.1 (70.0)	16.0 (60.8)	10.8 (51.4)	0.6 (33.1)	−3.5 (25.7)	9.2 (48.6)
Daily mean °C (°F)	−10.3 (13.5)	−8.6 (16.5)	−3.2 (26.2)	3.7 (38.7)	9.0 (48.2)	12.7 (54.9)	14.5 (58.1)	14.2 (57.6)	8.8 (47.8)	3.7 (38.7)	−5.7 (21.7)	−10.2 (13.6)	2.4 (36.3)
Mean daily minimum °C (°F)	−17.2 (1.0)	−15.8 (3.6)	−9.6 (14.7)	−3.5 (25.7)	1.7 (35.1)	6.1 (43.0)	8.0 (46.4)	7.2 (45.0)	1.5 (34.7)	−3.5 (25.7)	−12 (10)	−16.9 (1.6)	−4.5 (23.9)
Record low °C (°F)	−53.9 (−65.0)	−55.6 (−68.1)	−44.4 (−47.9)	−33.9 (−29.0)	−15.6 (3.9)	−11.1 (12.0)	−6.7 (19.9)	−11.7 (10.9)	−16.7 (1.9)	−30.1 (−22.2)	−40 (−40)	−53.9 (−65.0)	−55.6 (−68.1)
Average precipitation mm (inches)	19.1 (0.75)	15.2 (0.60)	18.0 (0.71)	23.9 (0.94)	65.2 (2.57)	86.6 (3.41)	114.6 (4.51)	67.3 (2.65)	73.8 (2.91)	25.9 (1.02)	17.3 (0.68)	15.9 (0.63)	542.8 (21.37)
Average rainfall mm (inches)	0.2 (0.01)	0.6 (0.02)	1.3 (0.05)	12.5 (0.49)	52.4 (2.06)	86.6 (3.41)	114.6 (4.51)	67.3 (2.65)	68.5 (2.70)	13.3 (0.52)	1.6 (0.06)	0.4 (0.02)	419.6 (16.52)
Average snowfall cm (inches)	26.2 (10.3)	21.5 (8.5)	25.7 (10.1)	14.3 (5.6)	12.8 (5.0)	0.02 (0.01)	0.0 (0.0)	0.0 (0.0)	5.7 (2.2)	14.7 (5.8)	21.8 (8.6)	22.8 (9.0)	165.1 (65.0)
Source: Environment Canada

== Demographics ==
In the 2021 Census of Population conducted by Statistics Canada, the Town of Rocky Mountain House had a population of 6,765 living in 2,693 of its 3,075 total private dwellings, a change of 2% from its 2016 population of 6,635. With a land area of 13.05 km^{2} (5.04 sq mi), it had a population density of 518.4/km^{2} (1,342.6/sq mi) in 2021.

In the 2016 Census of Population conducted by Statistics Canada, the Town of Rocky Mountain House recorded a population of 6,635 living in 2,599 of its 2,954 total private dwellings, a −4.3% change from its 2011 population of 6,933. With a land area of 12.71 km^{2} (4.91 sq mi), it had a population density of 522.0/km^{2} (1,352.1/sq mi) in 2016.

The Town of Rocky Mountain House's 2012 municipal census counted a population of 7,300, a 1.0% increase over its 2007 municipal census population of 7,231.

== Economy ==
The economy of the Rocky Mountain House area is driven by petroleum, agriculture, and forestry. Tourism also plays a role in its economy due to its location at the crossroads of Highway 22 and Highway 11, and its location midway between Red Deer and the scenic Alberta's Rockies region.

== Transportation ==
By road, Rocky Mountain House is served by Highway 22 and Highway 11.

For air transport, Rocky Mountain House is served by its airport.

== Sports ==
The Recreation, Parks & Community Services Department hosts five annual sports tournaments. They include two slo-pitch, a sno-pitch, a volleyball and a hockey/slo-pitch combined tournament.

== Government ==
Rocky Mountain House's town council consists of Mayor Debbie Baich and councillors Dave Auld, Marley Capraro, Ken Moesker, Len Phillips, Dale Shippelt, and Tina Hutchinson. Debbie Baich resigned as mayor on August 13, 2024, and deputy mayor Marley Capraro was appointed as acting mayor.

Rocky Mountain House is located within the Rimbey-Rocky Mountain House-Sundre provincial electoral district, which is represented by Jason Nixon of the United Conservative Party.

== Twin town ==
Rocky Mountain House is twinned with Kamikawa, Hokkaido, Japan.

== See also ==
- List of communities in Alberta
- List of towns in Alberta
- Saskatchewan River fur trade
