= Kootanae House =

Former fur trading post in British Columbia, Canada

Kootanae House, also spelled Kootenae House, was a North West Company fur trading post built by Jaco Finlay under the direction of David Thompson near present-day Invermere, British Columbia, Canada in 1807. The trading post was established near the junction of Toby Creek and the Columbia River. In 1808 Thompson reckoned its location as 50°32′12″N 115°56′15″W. The actual location is Kootenae House National Historic Site, located at 50.526624°N 116.045440°W (the discrepancy is due to inaccuracies in Thompson's measurements). The trading post was abandoned in 1812 due to hostilities from the Peigans east of Howse Pass.

The site was designated a National Historic Site of Canada in 1934, with a plaque erected in 1938. The land the trading post was once on was donated to the Government of Canada in 1935.

In July 2005, Parks Canada, in cooperation with several members of the Ktunaxa Nation conducted archaeological investigations at the site of Thompson's Kootanae House, near Invermere BC. Kootanae House was David Thompson's first post constructed in the Columbia Basin and his "jumping off point" for further explorations throughout the region. The archaeology confirms that this site is the location of a North West Company trading posts and lays to rest some inconsistencies between the site and Thompson's description of the trading post. In 2009, signs describing the history of the site were added for the benefit of visitors.

== See also ==
- List of National Historic Sites of Canada in British Columbia
- Kullyspell House
- Saleesh House
- Fort Kootenay
- Kootenay, British Columbia (Fisherville)
