= Alberta Highway 11A =

Highway in Alberta

Highway 11A

Route information
- Auxiliary route of Highway 11
- Maintained by Alberta Transportation

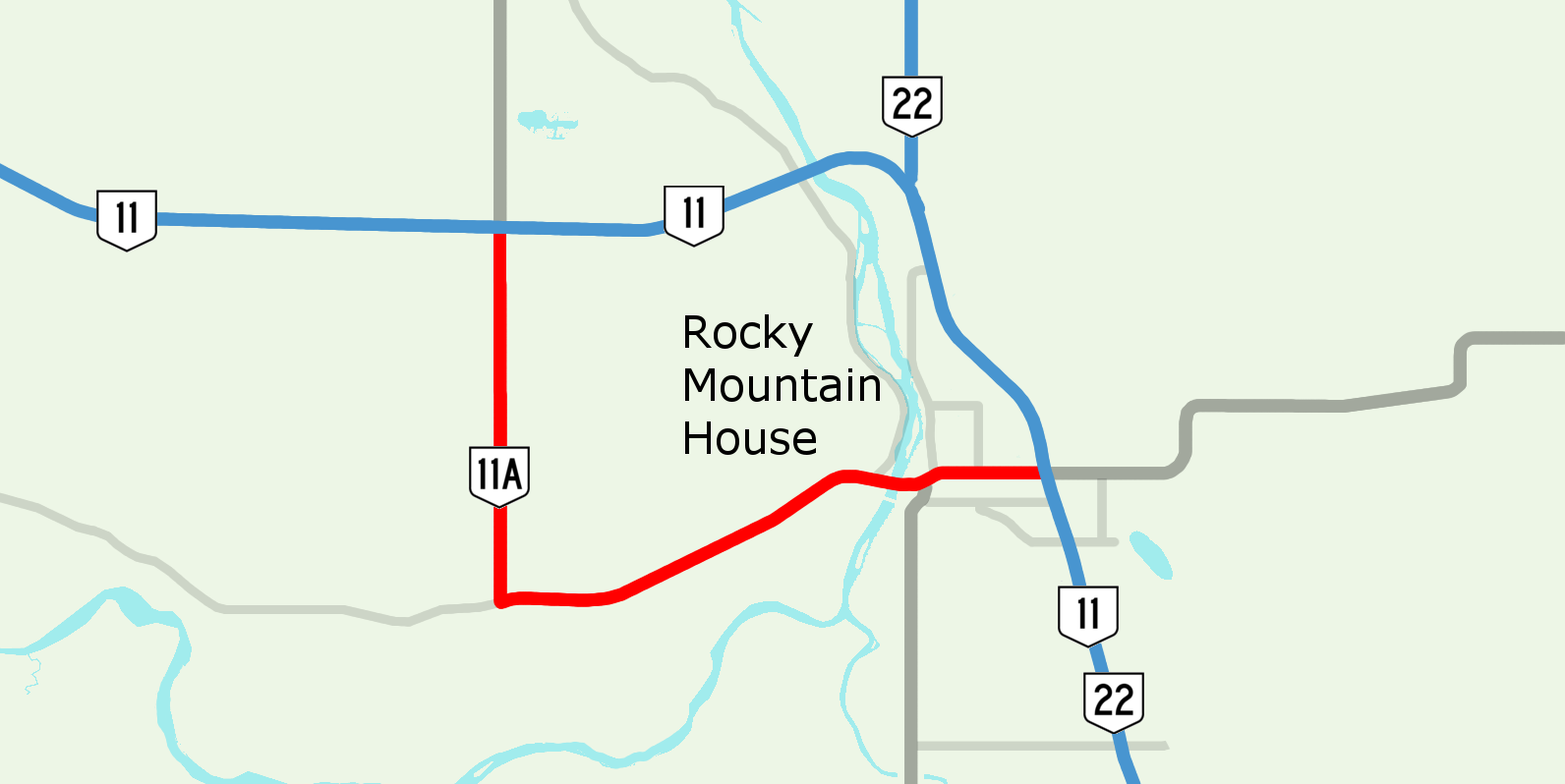
Rocky Mountain House segment
- Length: 11.7 km (7.3 mi)
- West end: Highway 11 / Highway 756 south of Crimson Lake Provincial Park
- East end: Highway 11 / Highway 22 / Highway 598 in Rocky Mountain House

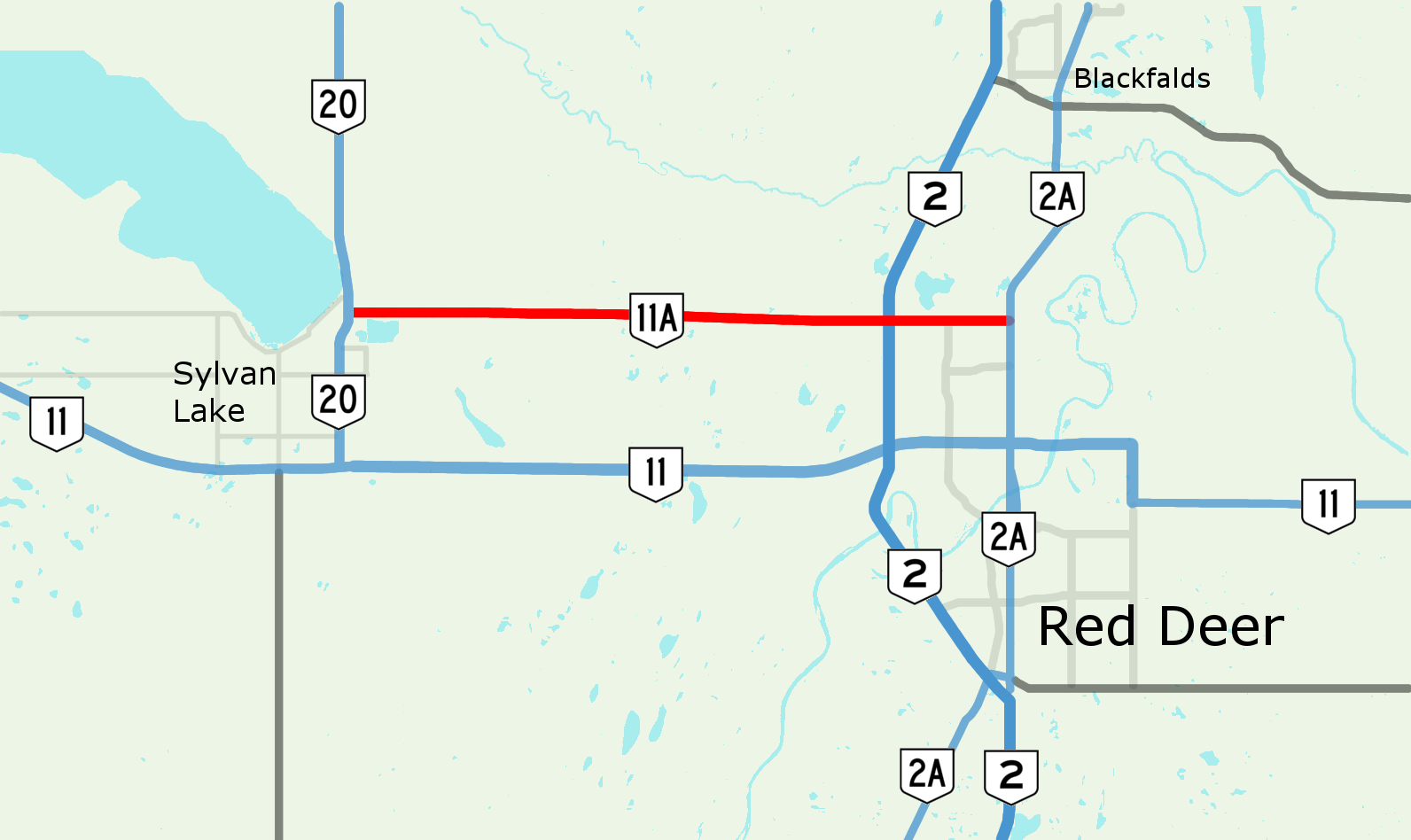
Sylvan Lake-Red Deer segment
- Length: 17.4 km (10.8 mi) (Formerly 30.6 km (19.0 mi))
- West end: Highway 20 in Sylvan Lake
- Major intersections: Highway 2 in Red Deer
- East end: Highway 2A in Red Deer

Location
- Country: Canada
- Province: Alberta
- Specialized and rural municipalities: Clearwater County, Red Deer County
- Major cities: Red Deer
- Towns: Rocky Mountain House, Sylvan Lake

Highway system
- Alberta Numbered Highway Network; List; Former
| ← Highway 11 | → Highway 12 |

Highway 11A is the designation of two routes that connect to Highway 11 (David Thompson Highway) in Alberta, Canada. The Rocky Mountain House section is referred to as 11A:02 by Alberta Transportation, while 11A:06 runs from Sylvan Lake to Red Deer.

== Rocky Mountain House ==
Highway 11A:02 begins at the Range Road 80 junction with Highway 11. It follows Range Road 80 south to Township Road 393, where it heads east to Rocky Mountain House, providing an alternate crossing of the North Saskatchewan River than Highway 11. Within Rocky Mountain House it is also known as 52 Avenue, and runs concurrent with Highway 752. Extending north past Highway 11, Highway 11A becomes Highway 756 as an entrance to Crimson Lake Provincial Park, extending east past Highways 11 and 22, Highway 11A becomes Highway 598.

The bridge that carries Highway 11A across the North Saskatchewan River at Rocky Mountain House was replaced because the previous structure had reached the end of its service life. The replacement, a three-span, 173-metre bridge using only two river piers, was built on a new alignment slightly downstream of the old crossing after five alignment options were studied; the design was chosen partly to limit disturbance to the river channel and floodplain. Water-bearing bedrock at the site meant the piers needed drilled-pile foundations. The project also widened the sidewalk and improved approach roadways on both sides.

Alberta Transportation has been studying the twinning of Highway 11 through Rocky Mountain House, updating a plan first drawn up in 2003; as of 2025 that twinning was not yet on the province's construction program, and the study does not include a bypass of the town. A separate, already-underway project is twinning Highway 11 itself between Rocky Mountain House and Sylvan Lake; two more short sections, one between Rocky Mountain House and Highway 22 and one between Benalto and the Medicine River, were in final design in 2025 with construction expected in 2026.

=== Major intersections ===
Starting from the north end of Highway 11A:

| Location | km | mi | Destinations | Notes |
|---|---|---|---|---|
| Clearwater County | 0.0 | 0.0 | Highway 756 north – Crimson Lake Provincial Park Highway 11 – Nordegg, Rocky Mountain House | Highway 11A western terminus; continues as Highway 756 |
| Clearwater County | 4.4 | 2.7 | Township Road 393 (Old Highway 11A) / Range Road 80 | |
| Clearwater County | 4.4 | 2.7 | Range Road 75 – Rocky Mountain House National Historic Site | |
| Rocky Mountain House | 9.5 | 5.9 | Crosses the North Saskatchewan River | |
| Rocky Mountain House | 10.3 | 6.4 | Highway 752 west / 60 Street | |
| Rocky Mountain House | 11.7 | 7.3 | Highway 11 / Highway 22 – Nordegg, Drayton Valley, Caroline, Red Deer Highway 598 east (52 Avenue) – Leslieville | Highway 11A eastern terminus; continues as Highway 598 |
1.000 mi = 1.609 km; 1.000 km = 0.621 mi

== Sylvan Lake - Red Deer ==
Highway 11A:06 is a rare alternate route (lettered highway), in that it does not intersect its parent route, Highway 11. It follows Township Road 390 from Highway 20 in Sylvan Lake to Highway 2A in Red Deer, it can be connected to Highway 11 with any of the Highways 20, 2, 2A or the four grid roads in between. The western terminus extended to Highway 11 near Benalto up to 2008/2009, before being dropped by Alberta Transportation. Highway 11A is known as Lakeshore Drive in Sylvan Lake, and 82 Street in Red Deer.

This section of Highway 11A, including the decommissioned stretch between Benalto and Sylvan Lake, was the original route of Highway 11 before it was rerouted along 67 Street and 30 Avenue in Red Deer and extended east in the late 1980s. For 34 years the Lakeshore Drive section passed the Wild Rapids Waterslide Park on the shore of Sylvan Lake. The park opened around 1982 and was, at the time of its closing, described as Alberta's second-largest water park after the one at West Edmonton Mall. Its owner, Bear Development Corp., closed it after the 2016 season, saying the aging slides, pumps, and heating systems would need to be replaced to meet current building and safety codes, and that this was not affordable for a park with only a two-month operating season. The town of Sylvan Lake then bought about five acres of the lakeshore site, including land held under a provincial licence of occupation, for close to $5 million, for future public use.

The City of Red Deer is also planning to construct the North Highway Connector, also known as Northland Drive, which will serve as a northern bypass for Highway 11. The project would widen Highway 11A to four lanes between Taylor Drive and Gaetz Avenue, build an overpass across the CP Rail line, and improve the Gaetz Avenue intersection. When Red Deer city council approved further planning in November 2018, the full project was estimated to cost $159.5 million over the 2019–2028 period, on top of $30.8 million in capital grants the city had already received; council member Ken Johnston argued the province should help pay for it since, in his words, "Highway 11A is a provincial asset." Stantec has described the connector as the first phase of a longer-term, roughly 30-year plan for a ring-road-style expressway around the east side of Red Deer. Phase I of the bypass would run along Northland Drive from the Highway 2A / Highway 11A intersection, cross the Red Deer River, and connect with Highway 11 at 30th Avenue / 67th Street; Phase II would follow 20th Avenue. It remains to be seen whether the completed bypass will be signed as part of Highway 11A.

=== Major intersections ===
Starting from the west end of Highway 11A:

| Rural/specialized municipality | Location | km | mi | Destinations | Notes |
|---|---|---|---|---|---|
| Red Deer County | Benalto | −13.2 | −8.2 | Highway 11 – Rocky Mountain House, Red Deer | Former Highway 11A western terminus |
| Sylvan Lake | | −2.2 | −1.4 | 50 Street | Former Highway 781 |
| Sylvan Lake | | 0.0 | 0.0 | Highway 20 – Bentley, Rimbey | Roundabout; Highway 11A western terminus |
| Red Deer County | No major junctions | | | | |
| City of Red Deer | | 14.2 | 8.8 | Highway 2 – Calgary, Edmonton | Interchange; Highway 2 exit 405 |
| City of Red Deer | | 15.8 | 9.8 | Taylor Drive / C&E Trail | |
| City of Red Deer | | 17.4 | 10.8 | Gaetz Avenue (Highway 2A) – Lacombe | Highway 11A eastern terminus |
1.000 mi = 1.609 km; 1.000 km = 0.621 mi: Closed/former
