= Crimson Lake (Alberta) =

Lake in Alberta, Canada

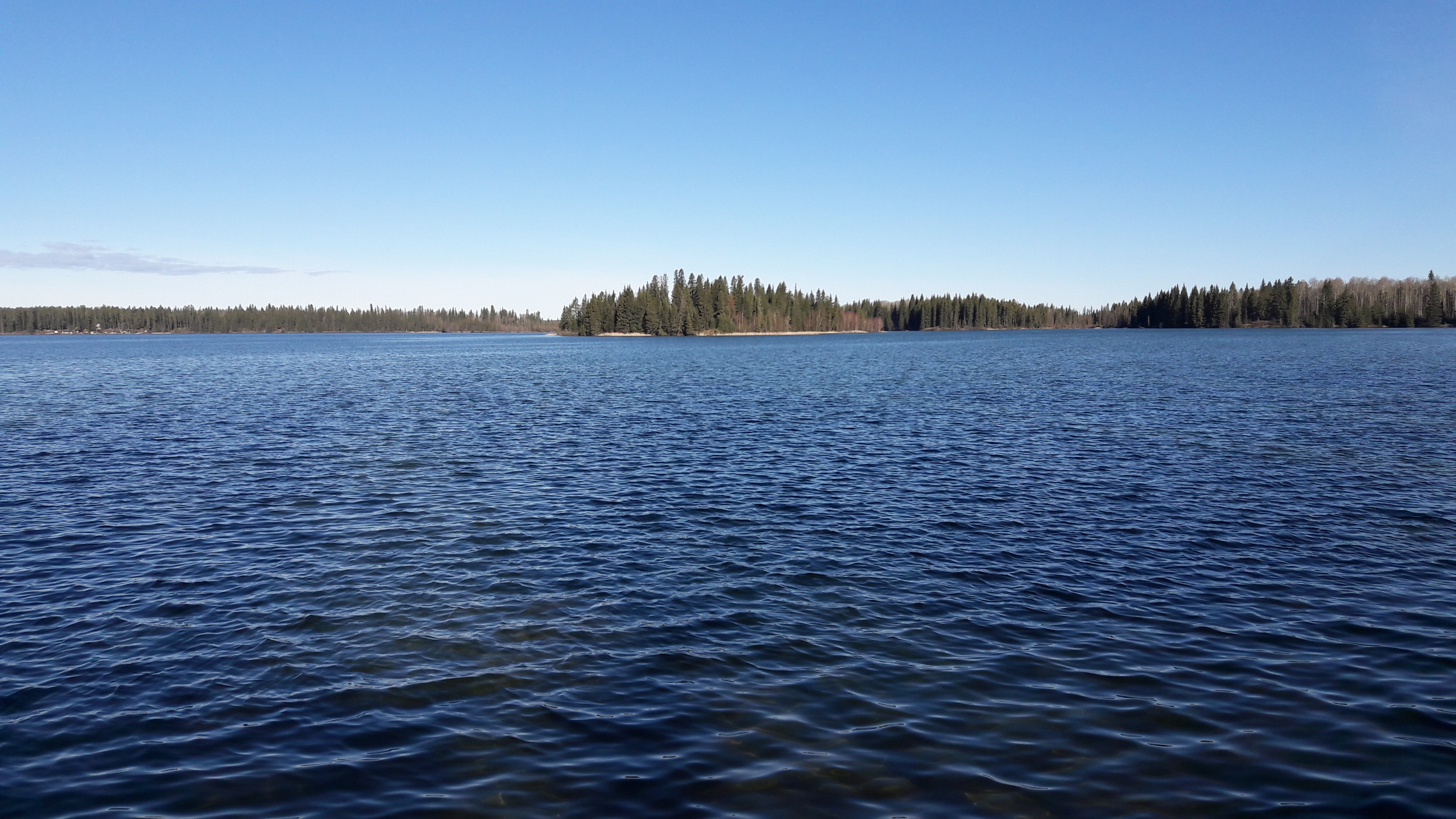

- Location within Alberta
- Location: Clearwater County, Alberta
- Coordinates: 52°27′31″N 115°02′12″W
- Basin countries: Canada
- Max. length: 1.9 km (1.2 mi)
- Max. width: 1.7 km (1.1 mi)
- Surface area: 2.32 km^{2} (0.90 sq mi)
- Average depth: 2.2 m (7 ft 3 in)
- Max. depth: 9.1 m (30 ft)
- Surface elevation: 964 m (3,163 ft)
- Settlements: Rocky Mountain House
- References: Crimson Lake

Crimson Lake is a lake in Alberta. It is located in Crimson Lake Provincial Park, in Clearwater County, northwest of the town of Rocky Mountain House. Birdwatching, swimming, boating and hiking are popular activities at Crimson Lake in the summer, while the winter season offers visitors cross-country skiing opportunities
