= Kullyspell House =

Coordinates: 48.22037°N 116.26687°W

Kullyspell House (also spelled Kullyspel House) was a fur trading post established in 1809 on Lake Pend Oreille in what is now North Idaho. It was built by Finan McDonald under the direction of David Thompson of the North West Company.

The post was located on the northeast shore of the lake on the Hope Peninsula, near the mouth of the Clark Fork river, just southeast of present-day Hope, Idaho.

On the 11th of September 1809 we made a scaffold to secure the provisions and goods, helved our Tools Ready to commence building; our first care was a strong Log building for the Goods and Furrs, and fur trading with the Natives. ... On the 23rd we had finished the Store House. To make the roof as tight as possible, which was covered with small Logs, we cut long grass and work (ed) it up with mud, and filled up the intervals of the small logs which answered tolerable well for Rain, but the Snow in melting found many a passage; in this manner we also builded our dwelling House; and roofed it, the floors were of split Logs, with the round side downwards ... our Chimneys were made of stone and mud rudely worked for about six feet in height and eighteen inches thick ... the fireplace is raised a little, and three to four feet in width.

Soon after establishing Kullyspell House Thompson set up two other trading posts in the region, Saleesh House and Spokane House. Being off the main line of travel between these posts, Kullyspell House was abandoned in 1811.

One source states that the two stone chimneys "remained standing for 87 years until they were toppled by a windstorm."

The city of Kalispell, in nearby Montana, now bears a respelling of the name. Kullyspel was David Thompson's spelling of the name the local indigenous people called themselves. Today they are known as the Pend d'Oreilles tribe.
