= Charlotte Small =

Charlotte Small (September 1, 1785 – May 4, 1857) was a Métis woman who notably joined her surveyor, map maker, and explorer husband David Thompson on his expeditions.

== Life ==
Charlotte Small was born on September 1, 1785, to North West Company investor-partner Patrick Small and a Cree woman whose name is not known. Her siblings were also involved in the fur trade; Patrick Small Jr. was a North West Company clerk and Nancy Small was the first wife of North West Company partner, John MacDonald of Garth.

Small married surveyor, map maker, and explorer David Thompson on 10 June 1799 at Île-à-la-Crosse, Saskatchewan. The two had 13 children, with whom Small often travelled to accompany Thompson on his expeditions ranging from the Rockies to Quebec. Small travelled 3 1/2 times farther on these expeditions with Thompson than did the American explorers Lewis and Clark.

When Thompson wrote in his journal "Today wed Charlotte Small", few could have imagined just how long he would honour that commitment. At a time when European explorers and traders were abandoning their wives and children for lives and families in Canada or Europe, Thompson remained faithful to the promise he had made, staying by the side of "his lovely wife" and providing for her and their 13 children. The couple were married for 58 years until Thompson's death in 1857. Small died a few months later on May 4, 1857. They are buried together at Mount Royal Cemetery, Montreal, Quebec, Canada.

== Works ==
- "Moccasin Miles - The Travels of Charlotte Small Thompson 1799–1812" Contemporary and Historical Maps: Charlotte Small (S. Leanne Playter & Andreas N. Korsos|Publisher: Arcturus Consulting)
- "Thompson in Alberta 1787–1812"; "David Thompson on the Columbia River 1807–1812"; "The Explorations and Travels of David Thompson 1784–1812"; "Posts and Forts of the North American Fur Trade 1600–1870" Contemporary and Historical Maps: David Thompson (Andreas N. Korsos|Publisher: Arcturus Consulting)
