= Saleesh House =

Coordinates: 47°34′20″N 115°18′19″W

Saleesh House, also known as Flathead Post, was a North West Company fur trading post built near present-day Thompson Falls, Montana in 1809 by David Thompson and James McMillan of the North West Company. It became a Hudson's Bay Company (HBC) post after that company merged with the North West Company in 1821. Under HBC control the post was better known as Flathead rather than Saleesh. It continued to operate until at least 1855.

Thompson had established the post of Kullyspell House earlier in the year in the territory of the Pend d'Oreilles (who Thompson called the Kullyspel, an early variant spelling of "Kalispell"). This post was sited near the mouth of the Clark Fork river. By October Thompson had decided to established another post farther up the Clark Fork in the territory of the Flatheads. Thompson's name for the Flatheads was Saleesh. He also called Clark Fork the Saleesh River. The Saleesh House trading post was built by the end of 1809.

The location of Saleesh House proved ideal, as it was on a route connecting the higher mountain country with bison hunting grounds near Flathead Lake. Several tribes used this route and traditionally encamped for winter near the Saleesh House site. The post quickly attracted a diverse community around itself. In addition, the region around the post was rich with beavers. The indigenous peoples had access to pemmican supplies and were willing to trap and trade beaver skins. The Saleesh House rapidly became the focal point of an impressively rich fur trading region in what would become Montana.

It was at Saleesh House in late 1809 and early 1810 that David Thompson acquired the nickname Koo-koo-Sint, or "Star-Looker".

In 1810 Thompson and other members of the North West Company linked Saleesh House with Spokane House via a trail known as the "Skeetshoo Indian Road". Thompson soon left and did not return to Saleesh House until 1812, where he found the post in poor condition. Thompson repaired and rebuilt the post more permanently.

Joint British - U.S. occupation of areas west of the Rocky Mountains continental divide pursuant to the Treaty of 1818 ended with the Oregon Treaty in June, 1846, which extended the international boundary along the 49th parallel from the ridge of the Rocky Mountains to the Pacific Ocean.
