= David Thompson (explorer) =

Canadian fur trader and surveyor (1770–1857)

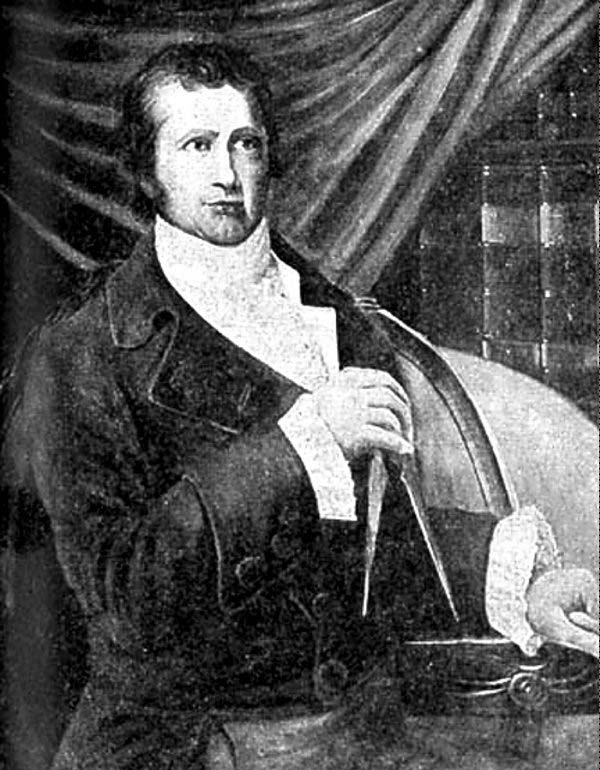
- Born: Dafydd ap Thomas; 30 April 1770; Westminster, England
- Died: 10 February 1857 (aged 86); Longueuil, Canada East
- Occupations: Explorer and Map Maker
- Spouse: Charlotte Small
- Children: Fanny (1801), Samuel (1804), Emma (1806), John (1808), Joshuah (1811), Henry (1813), Charlotte (1815), Elizabeth (1817), William (1819), Thomas (1822), George (1824), Mary (1827), Eliza (1829)
- Parent(s): David and Ann Thompson

David Thompson (30 April 1770 – 10 February 1857) was a British fur trader, surveyor, and cartographer, known to some native people as "Koo-Koo-Sint" or "the Stargazer". Over Thompson's career, he travelled 90,000 kilometres (56,000 mi) across North America, mapping 4.9 million square kilometres (1.9 million square miles) of the continent along the way. For this historic feat, Thompson has been described as the "greatest practical land geographer that the world has produced".

== Early life ==
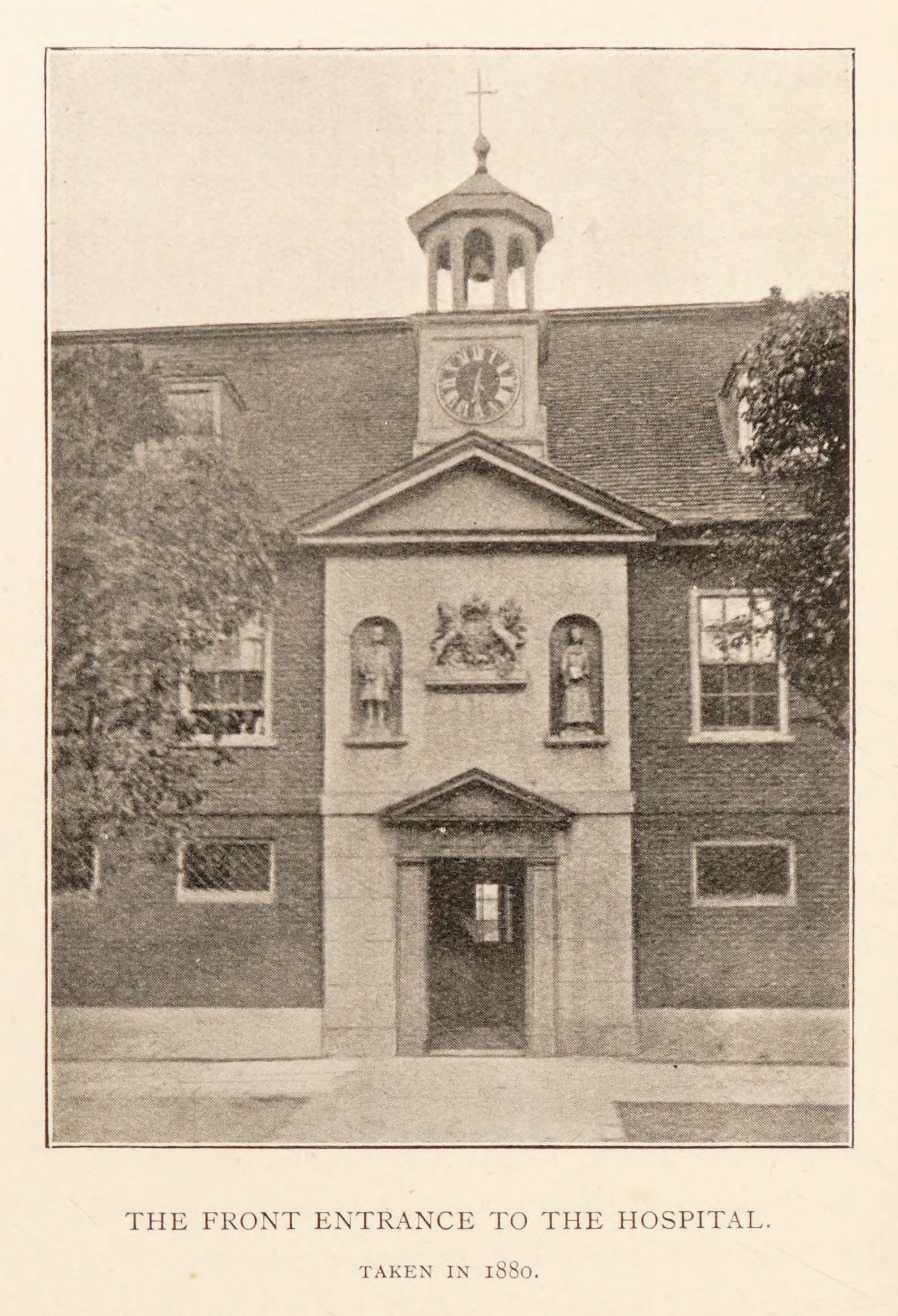
Grey Coat Hospital, front entrance, taken in 1880

David Thompson was born in Westminster, Middlesex, to recent Welsh migrants from Radnorshire David and Ann Thompson. They changed their family name from ap Thomas to Thompson. When Thompson was two, his father died. Due to his widowed mother not having financial resources, she placed Thompson, 29 April 1777, the day before his seventh birthday, and his older brother in the Grey Coat Hospital, a school for the disadvantaged of Westminster. Thompson graduated to the Grey Coat mathematical school, well known for teaching navigation and surveying.

He received an education for the Royal Navy: including mathematics of trigonometry and geometry, practical navigation including using of nautical instruments, finding latitudes and longitudes and making navigational calculations from observing the sun, moon and tide, and drawing maps and charts, taking land measurements, and sketching landscapes. He later built on these skills to make his career. In 1784, when Thompson was 14, the Grey Coat treasurer paid the Hudson's Bay Company the sum of five pounds, upon which the youth became an apprentice employee of the company, contracted for a period of seven years to be trained as a clerk. In fact, two students had been selected for apprenticeships, but the other child was so scared of moving to the wilderness that he ran away, leaving just Thompson to take the position.

He set sail on a ship to North America on 28 May of that year, leaving England.

== Hudson's Bay Company (HBC) ==
On 2 September 1784, Thompson arrived in Churchill (now in Manitoba) and was put to work as a clerk/secretary, copying the personal papers of the governor of Fort Churchill, Samuel Hearne. The next year he was transferred to nearby York Factory, and over the next few years spent time as a secretary at Cumberland House, and South Branch House of the Hudson's Bay Company before being transferred to Manchester House in 1787. During those years he learned to keep accounts and other records, calculate values of furs (it was noted that he also had several expensive beaver pelts at that time even when a secretary's job would not pay terribly well), track supplies and other duties.

In addition to clerical duties, Thompson began seeking out field missions. In 1786, he joined a group of traders heading south and west on the Hayes River, crossed Lake Winnipeg, went up the Saskatchewan River, and made it to the foothills of the Rocky Mountains. He returned to the Rockies on a trade mission the following year to meet with the Piegan Blackfeet Indians. Thompson wintered with the tribe, learned their language, and established lifelong friendships.

On 23 December 1788, Thompson seriously fractured his tibia, forcing him to spend the next two winters at Cumberland House convalescing. It was during this time that he greatly refined and expanded his mathematical, astronomical, and surveying skills under the tutelage of Hudson's Bay Company surveyor Philip Turnor. It was also during this time that he lost sight in his right eye.

While sitting alone one winter day in front of a chequerboard, Thompson wrote in his diary that the devil showed up and took the seat opposite him, and the two played numerous games, all of which the devil lost. Then, all at once, he was alone again. Whether it was a dream or a hallucination, he didn't say, but David Thompson became a staunch Christian after the experience and remained so for the rest of his life.

In 1790, with his apprenticeship nearing its end, Thompson requested a set of surveying tools in place of the typical parting gift of fine clothes offered by the company to those completing their indenture. He received both. He entered the employ of the Hudson's Bay Company as a fur trader. In 1792 he completed his first significant survey, mapping a route to Lake Athabasca (where today's Alberta/Saskatchewan border is located).

Between February and May 1793, Thompson made 34 observations of the longitude of Cumberland House using lunar distances. The mean of these observations was 102°12′ W, about 2′ east of the modern value. The mean error of the 34 observations was about 15′ of longitude. Broughton (2009) notes that the precision of the type of sextant used by Thompson was 15″ of arc, corresponding to 7.5′ of longitude giving an absolute limit to the precision of an individual observation. The error in Thompson's mean was several times less than this. The time he took on these observations, about 3 hours of calculation each, indicates that he understood the power of averages.

In recognition of his map-making and surveying skills, Thompson was promoted to official surveyor of the Hudson’s Bay Company in 1794. He continued working for the Hudson's Bay Company until 23 May 1797 when, frustrated by an order to cease surveying and focus on the fur trade, he left. He walked 130 kilometres (80 mi) in the snow in order to enter the employ of the competition, the North West Company. There he continued to work as a fur trader and surveyor.

== North West Company ==
Thompson's decision to defect to the North West Company (NWC) in 1797 without providing the customary one-year notice was not well received by his former employers. But the North West Company was more supportive of Thompson pursuing his work on surveying and mapping the interior of what was to become Canada, as they judged it in the company's interest to know the exact locations of their settlements and the distances between them. In 1797, Thompson was sent south by his employers to survey part of the Canada-US boundary along the water routes from Lake Superior to Lake of the Woods to satisfy unresolved questions of territory arising from the Jay Treaty of 1794 between Great Britain and the United States after the American Revolutionary War.

By 1798 Thompson had completed a survey of 6,750 km (4,190 mi) from Grand Portage, through Lake Winnipeg, to the headwaters of the Assiniboine and Mississippi rivers, as well as two sides of Lake Superior. In 1798, the company sent him to Red Deer Lake (Lac La Biche in present-day Alberta) to establish a trading post. (The English translation of Lac la Biche: Red Deer Lake, was first recorded on the Mackenzie map of 1793.) Thompson spent the next few seasons trading based in Fort George (now in Alberta), and during this time led several expeditions into the Rocky Mountains.

On 10 July 1804, at the annual meeting of the North West Company in Kaministiquia, Thompson was made a full partner of the company. He became a 'wintering partner', who was based in the field rather than Montreal, and was granted two of the 92 NWC's shares worth more than £4,000. He spent the next few seasons based there managing the fur trading operations, but still finding time to expand his surveys of the waterways around Lake Superior. At the 1806 company meeting, officers decided to send Thompson back into the interior. Concern over the United States-backed expedition of Lewis and Clark prompted the North West Company to charge Thompson with the task of finding a route to the Pacific to open up the lucrative trading territories of the Pacific Northwest.

== Columbia River travels ==
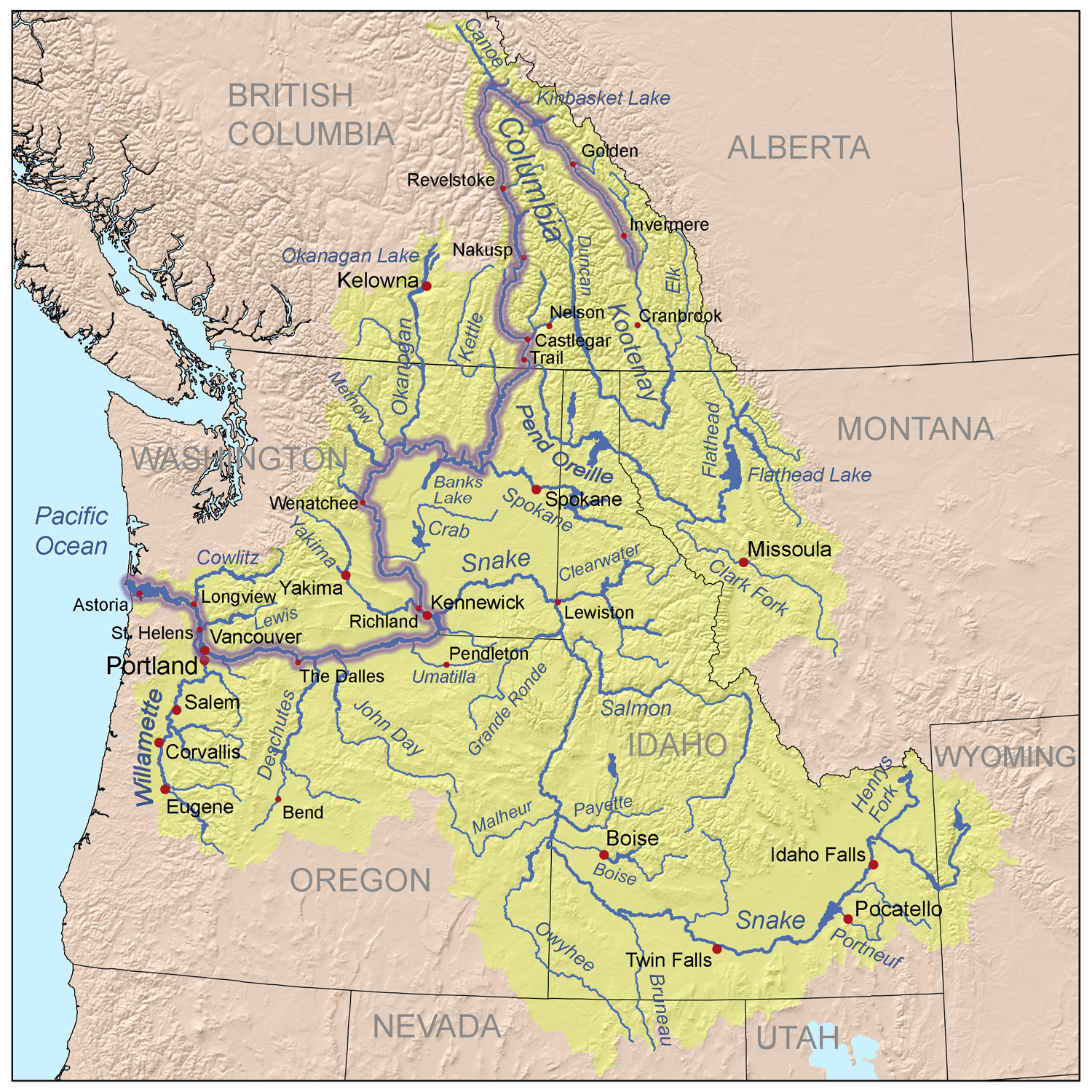
David Thompson navigated the entire length of the Columbia River in 1811. This map of the Columbia and its tributaries shows modern political boundaries.

After the general meeting in 1806, Thompson travelled to Rocky Mountain House and prepared for an expedition to follow the Columbia River to the Pacific Ocean. In June 1807 Thompson crossed the Rocky Mountains and spent the summer surveying the Columbia basin; he continued to survey the area over the next few seasons. Thompson mapped and established trading posts in Northwestern Montana, Idaho, Washington, and Western Canada. Trading posts he founded included Kootenae House, Kullyspell House and Saleesh House; the latter two were the first trading posts west of the Rockies in Idaho and Montana, respectively. These posts established by Thompson extended North West Company fur trading territory into the Columbia Basin drainage area. The maps he made of the Columbia River basin east of the Cascade Mountains were of such high quality and detail that they continued to be useful into the 20th-century.

In early 1810, Thompson was returning eastward toward Montreal but, while en route at Rainy Lake, received orders to return to the Rocky Mountains and establish a route to the mouth of the Columbia. The North West Company was responding to the plans of American entrepreneur John Jacob Astor to send a ship around the Americas to establish a fur trading post of the Pacific Fur Company on the Pacific Coast. During his return, Thompson was delayed by an angry group of Peigan natives at Howse Pass. Instead of pushing through with violence, he led the canoe brigade to seek a new route across the Rocky Mountains and found one through Athabasca Pass.

David Thompson was the first European to navigate the full length of the Columbia River. Between Kettle Falls (3 July 1811) and the Junction of the Columbia and Snake Rivers (9 July), he was travelling through country that had never been visited by Europeans, and took time to visit the villages along the way to establish good relations, helped by copious quantities of tobacco. In 1805 Lewis and Clark had descended the Snake River, and continued down the Columbia. On reaching the junction Thompson erected a pole and a notice claiming the country for Great Britain and stating the intention of the North West Company to build a trading post at the site. This notice was found later that year by Astor company workers looking to establish an inland fur post, contributing to their selection of a more northerly site at Fort Okanogan. The North West Company established its post of Fort Nez Percés near the Snake River confluence several years later. Continuing down the Columbia, Thompson passed over the Celilo Falls, almost losing the canoe on the rocks, and portaged around the rapids of The Dalles and the Cascades Rapids. On 14 July 1811, Thompson reached the partially constructed Fort Astoria at the mouth of the Columbia, arriving two months after the Pacific Fur Company's ship, the Tonquin.

Before returning upriver and across the mountains, Thompson hired Naukane, a Native Hawaiian Takane labourer brought to Fort Astoria by the Pacific Fur Company's ship Tonquin. Naukane, known as Coxe to Thompson, accompanied Thompson across the continent to Lake Superior before journeying on to England.

Thompson wintered at Saleesh House before beginning his final journey in 1812 back to Montreal, where the North West Company was based.

In his published journals, Thompson recorded seeing large footprints (“which measured fourteen inches in length by eight inches in breadth”) near what is now Jasper, Alberta, in 1811. It has been suggested that these prints were similar to what has since been called the sasquatch. However, Thompson noted that these tracks showed "a small Nail at the end of each [toe]", which led him to surmise it was a bear, but he had doubts, saying, "I held it to be the track of a large old grizzled bear; yet the shortness of the nails, the ball of the foot, and its great size was not that of a Bear".

The years 1807–1812 are the most carefully scrutinized in his career and comprise his most enduring historical legacy, due to his development of the commercial routes across the Rockies, and his mapping of the lands they traverse.

== Appearance and personality ==
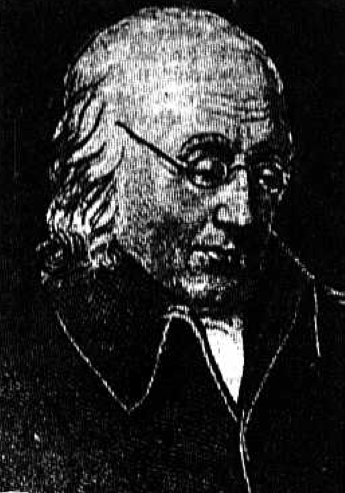
David Thompson late in life

In 1820, the English geologist, John Jeremiah Bigsby, attended a dinner party given by The Hon. William McGillivray at his home, Chateau St. Antoine, one of the early estates in Montreal's Golden Square Mile. He describes the party and some of the guests in his entertaining book The Shoe and Canoe, giving an excellent description of David Thompson:

I was well placed at table between one of the Miss McGillivray's and a singular-looking person of about fifty. He was plainly dressed, quiet, and observant. His figure was short and compact, and his black hair was worn long all round, and cut square, as if by one stroke of the shears, just above the eyebrows. His complexion was of the gardener's ruddy brown, while the expression of his deeply-furrowed features was friendly and intelligent, but his cut-short nose gave him an odd look. His speech betrayed the Welshman, although he left his native hills when very young. I might have been spared this description of Mr David Thompson by saying he greatly resembled Curran the Irish Orator...

I afterwards travelled much with him, and have now only to speak of him with great respect, or, I ought to say, with admiration... No living person possesses a tithe of his information respecting the Hudson's Bay countries... Never mind his Bunyan-like face and cropped hair; he has a very powerful mind, and a singular faculty of picture-making. He can create a wilderness and people it with warring savages, or climb the Rocky Mountains with you in a snow-storm, so clearly and palpably, that only shut your eyes and you hear the crack of the rifle, or feel the snow-flakes melt on your cheeks as he talks.

== Marriage and children ==
On 10 June 1799 at Île-à-la-Crosse, Thompson married Charlotte Small, a thirteen-year-old Métis daughter of Scottish fur trader Patrick Small and a Cree mother. Their marriage was formalised thirteen years later at the Scotch Presbyterian Church in Montreal on 30 October 1812. He and Charlotte had 13 children together; five of them were born before he left the fur trade. The family did not adjust easily to life in Eastern Canada; they lived in Montreal while he was travelling. Two of the children, John (aged 5) and Emma (aged 7), died of round worms, a common parasite. By the time of Thompson's death, the couple had been married 57 years, the longest marriage known in Canada pre-Confederation.

== Later life ==
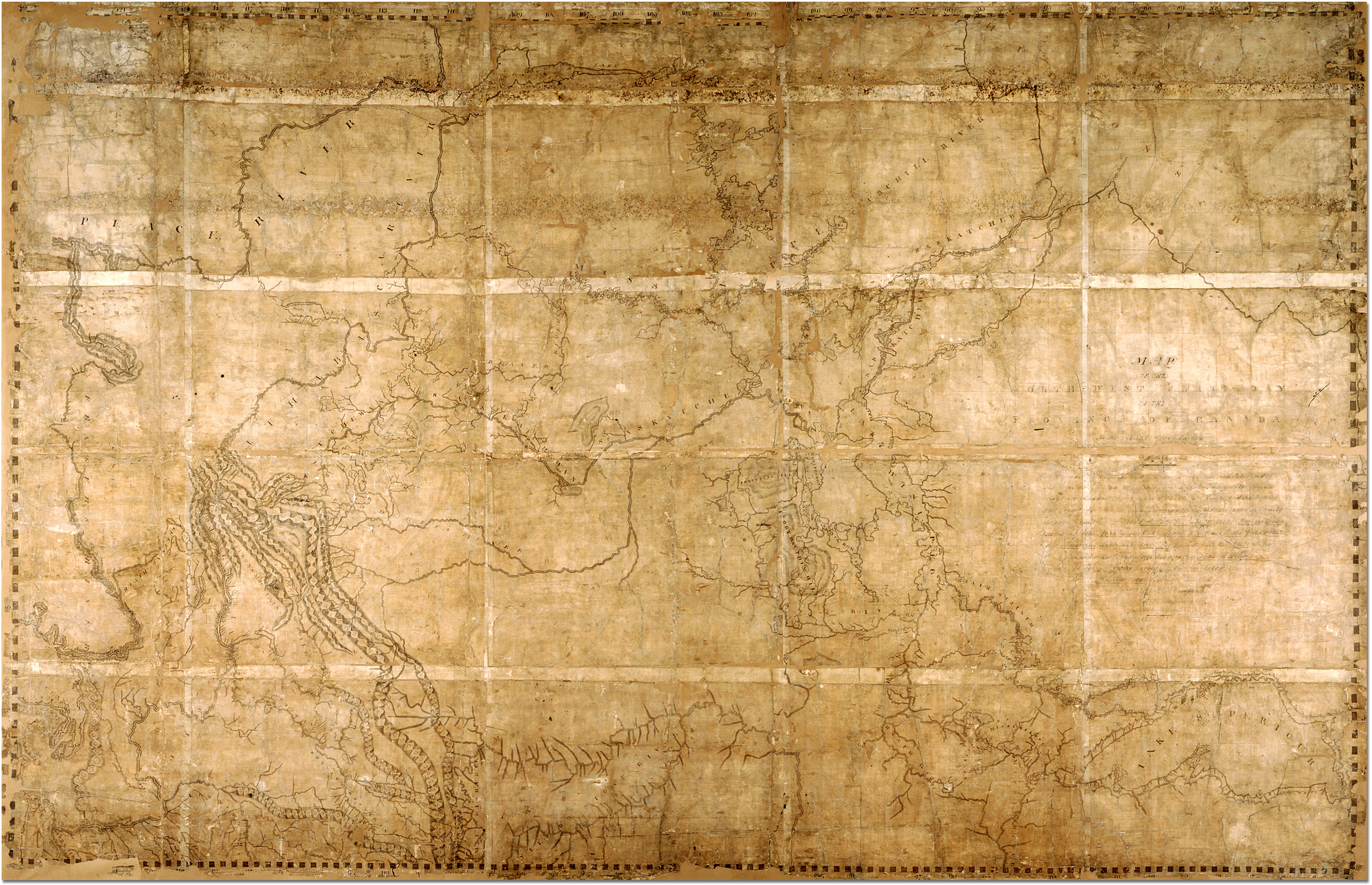
Map of the North-West Territory of the Province of Canada, stretching from the Fraser River on the west to Lake Superior on the east. By David Thompson, 1814.

Upon his arrival back in Montreal, Thompson retired with a generous pension from the North West Company. He settled in nearby Terrebonne and worked on completing his great map, a summary of his lifetime of exploring and surveying the interior of North America. The map covered the wide area stretching from Lake Superior to the Pacific, and was given by Thompson to the North West Company. Thompson's 1814 map, his greatest achievement, was so accurate that 100 years later it was still the basis for many of the maps issued by the Canadian government. It now resides in the Archives of Ontario.

In 1815, Thompson moved his family to Williamstown, Upper Canada, and a few years later was employed to survey the newly established borders with the United States from Lake of the Woods to the Eastern Townships of Quebec, established by Treaty of Ghent after the War of 1812. In 1843 Thompson completed his atlas of the region from Hudson Bay to the Pacific Ocean.

Afterwards, Thompson returned to a life as a land owner, but soon financial misfortune would ruin him. By 1831 he was so deeply in debt he was forced to take up a position as a surveyor for the British American Land Company to provide for his family. His luck continued to worsen and he was forced to move in with his daughter and son-in-law in 1845. He began work on a manuscript chronicling his life exploring the continent, but this project was left unfinished when his sight failed him completely in 1851.

== Death and afterward ==
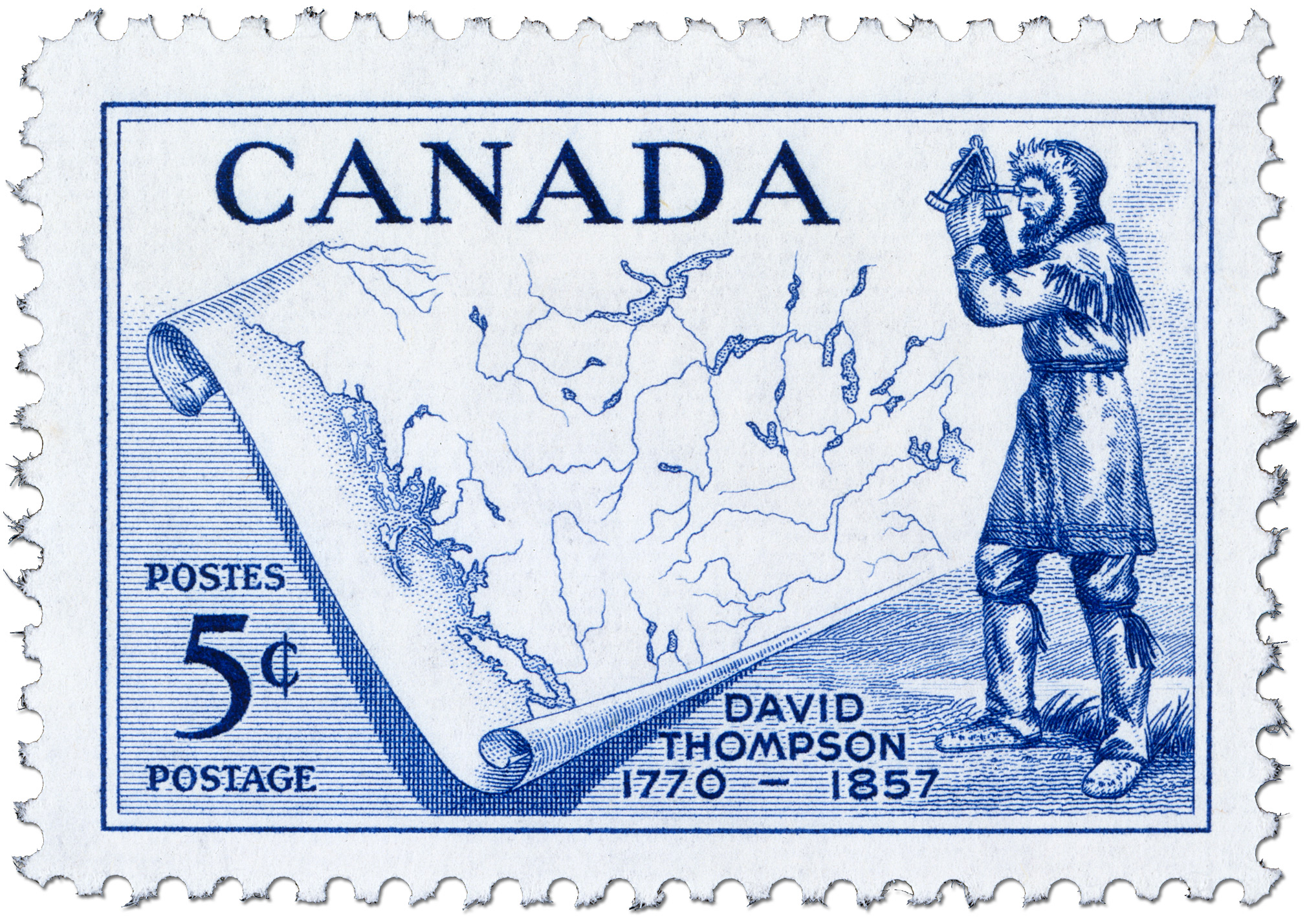
Postage stamp commemorating David Thompson's life

The land mass mapped by Thompson amounted to 3.9 million square kilometres (1.5 million square miles) of wilderness (one-fifth of the continent). His contemporary, the great explorer Alexander Mackenzie, remarked that Thompson did more in ten months than he would have thought possible in two years.

Despite these significant achievements, Thompson died in Montreal in near obscurity on 10 February 1857, his accomplishments almost unrecognised. He never finished the book of his 28 years in the fur trade, based on his 77 field notebooks, before he died. In the 1890s geologist J.B. Tyrrell resurrected Thompson's notes and in 1916 published them as David Thompson's Narrative, as part of the General Series of the Champlain Society. Further editions and re-examinations of Thompson's life and works were published in 1962 by Richard Glover, in 1971 by Victor Hopwood, and in 2015 by William Moreau.

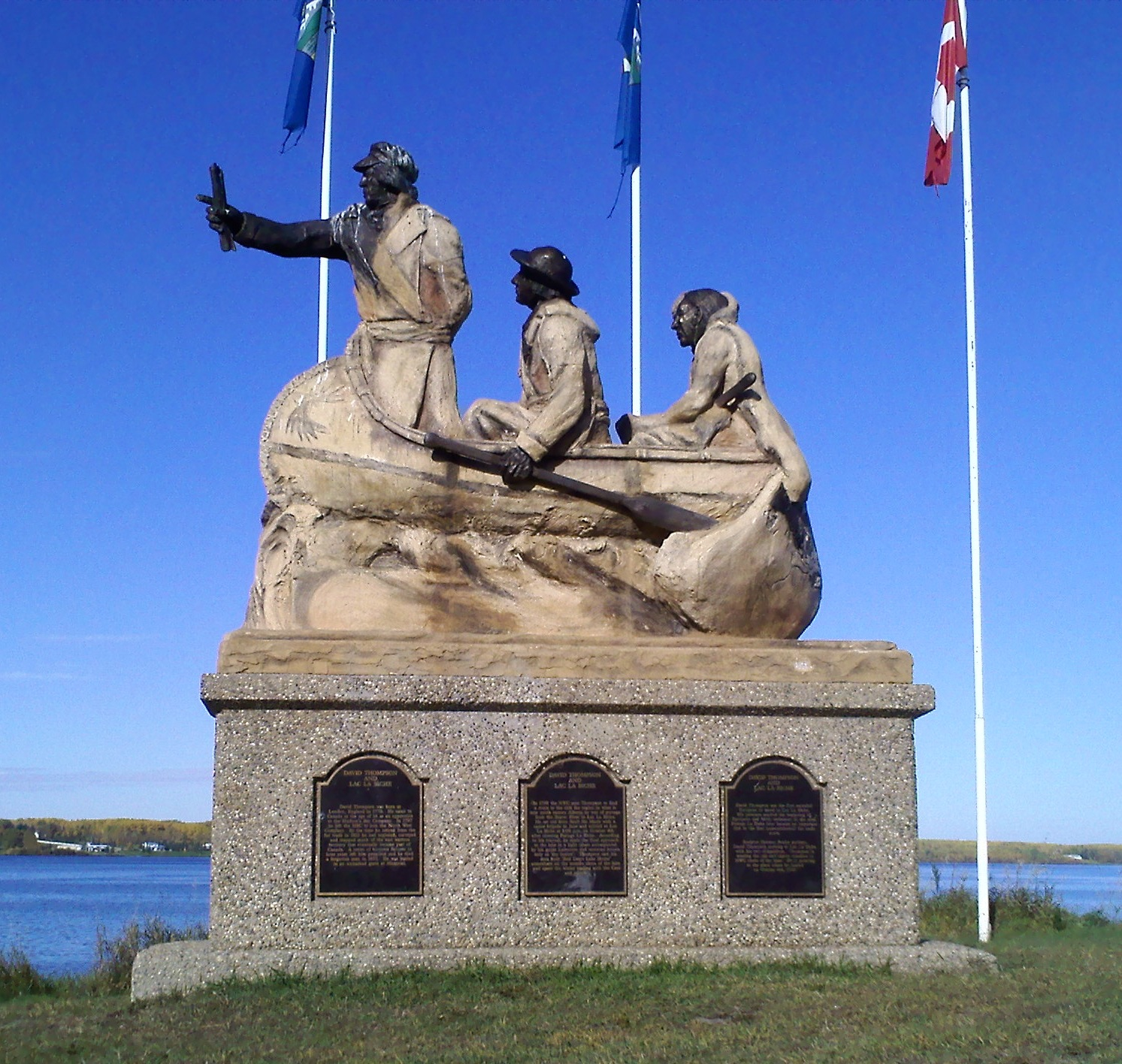
David Thompson and two First Nations guides on the shore of Lac la Biche, where he landed on 4 October 1798.

Thompson's body was interred in Montreal's Mount Royal Cemetery in an unmarked grave. It was not until 1926 that efforts by J.B. Tyrrell and the Canadian Historical Society resulted in the placing of a tombstone to mark his grave. The next year, Thompson was named a National Historic Person by the federal government, one of the earliest such designations. A federal plaque reflecting that status is at Jasper National Park, Alberta. Meantime, Thompson's achievements are central reasons for other national historic designations:

- David Thompson on the Columbia River National Historic Event, marked at Castlegar, BC
- Athabasca Pass National Historic Site (NHS), at Jasper National Park
- Boat Encampment NHS, BC
- Howse Pass NHS, Banff National Park, Alberta
- Kootenae House NHS, BC
- Rocky Mountain House NHS, Alberta

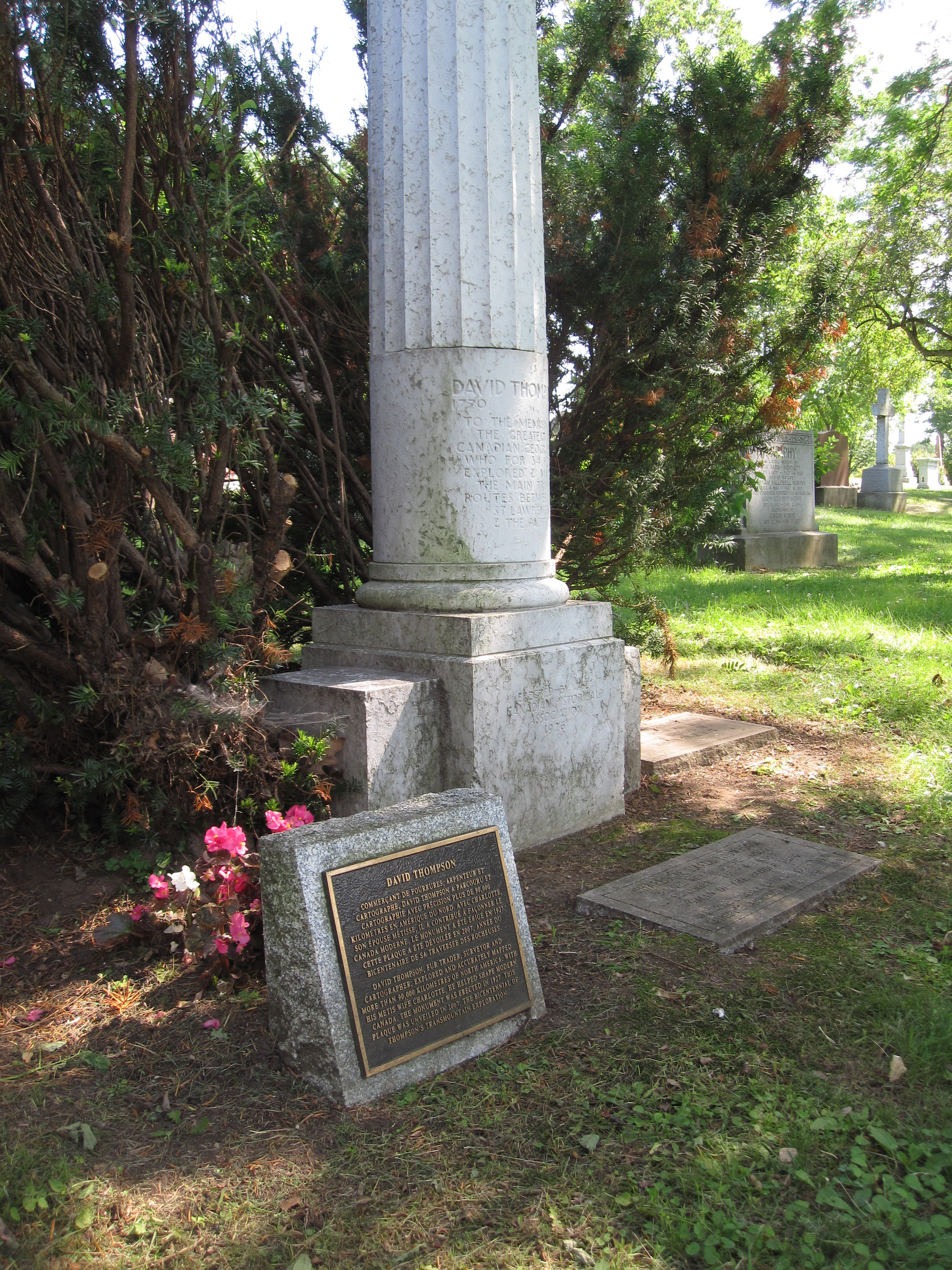
David & Charlotte Thompson's gravestone in Mount Royal Cemetery

In 1957, one hundred years after his death, Canada's post office department honoured him with his image on a postage stamp. The David Thompson Highway in Alberta was named in his honour, along with David Thompson High School on the side of the highway near Leslieville, Alberta. There are also two David Thompson Secondary Schools, one in Vancouver, BC, and one in Invermere, BC.

Thompson's prowess as a geographer has gained historic and contemporary recognition. In 1916, Canadian geologist and historian Joseph Tyrell called Thompson "the greatest land geographer that the world has produced."

There is a monument dedicated to David Thompson (maintained by the state of North Dakota) near the former town site of the ghost town Verendrye, North Dakota, located approximately 2 miles (3.2 km) north and 1 mile (1.6 km) west of Karlsruhe, North Dakota. Thompson Falls, Montana, and British Columbia's Thompson River and Thompson Falls on the Blaeberry River are also named after the explorer.

There is a statue commemorating David Thompson in downtown Sandpoint, Idaho, near the intersection of Second Avenue and Main Street.

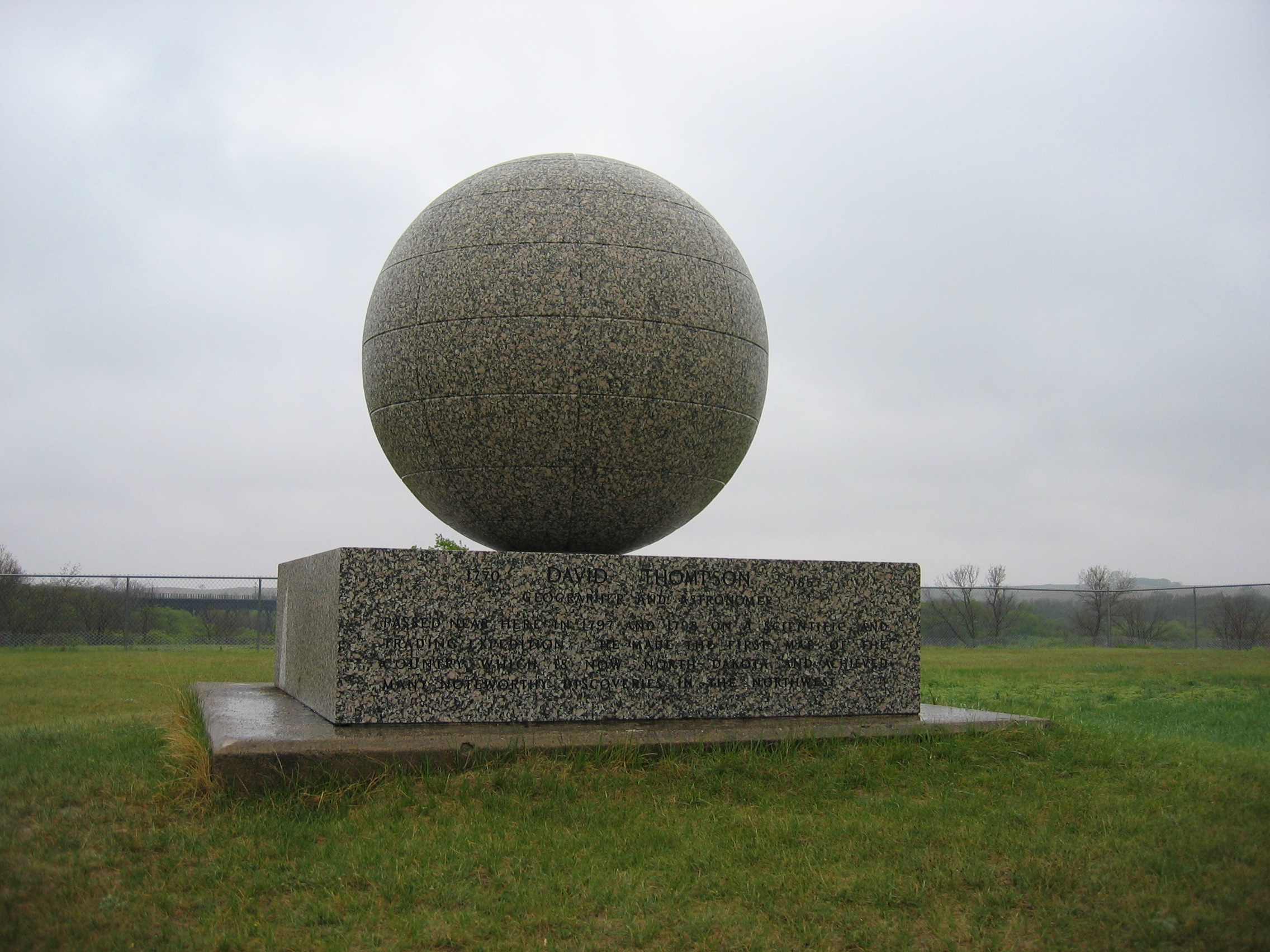
David Thompson Memorial, Verendrye, North Dakota

The year 2007 marked the 150th year of Thompson's death and the 200th anniversary of his first crossing of the Rocky Mountains. Commemorative events and exhibits were planned across Canada and the United States from 2007 to 2011 as a celebration of his accomplishments.

In 2007, a commemorative plaque was placed on a wall at the Grey Coat Hospital, the school for the disadvantaged of Westminster David Thompson attended as a boy, by English author and TV presenter Ray Mears.

Thompson was the subject of a 1964 National Film Board of Canada short film David Thompson: The Great Mapmaker , as well as the BBC2 programme Ray Mears' Northern Wilderness (Episode 5), broadcast in November 2009. He's also the subject of 2010 KSPS-TV film Uncharted Territory: David Thompson on the Columbia Plateau.

He is referenced in the 1981 folk song "Northwest Passage" by Stan Rogers.

The national park service, Parks Canada, announced in 2018 that it had named its new research vessel RV David Thompson, to be used for underwater archaeology, including sea floor mapping, and for marine science in the Pacific, Atlantic, Arctic Oceans, and the Great Lakes. It will be the main platform for research on the Wrecks of HMS Erebus and HMS Terror National Historic Site.

The David Thompson Astronomical Observatory at Fort William Historical Park was named to commemorate David Thompson and his discoveries.

== See also ==
- Exploration of North America
- Fur trade

== Works ==
- 1814: Map of the North-West Territory of the Province of Canada
- 1897: New light on the early history of the greater Northwest (edited by Elliott Coues) Volume I; Volume II; Volume III
- 1916: David Thompson's narrative of his explorations in western America, 1784–1812 (edited by J.B. Tyrrell)
- 1950: David Thompson's journals relating to Montana and adjacent regions, 1808–1812 (edited by M. Catherine White)
- 1962: David Thompson's narrative, 1784–1812 (edited by Richard Glover)
- 1974: David Thompson's journal of the international boundary survey, 1817–1827: western Lake Erie, August–September 1819 (edited by Clarke E. Leverette)
- 1993: Columbia Journals (edited by Barbara Belyea)
- 2006: "Moccasin Miles – The Travels of Charlotte Small Thompson 1799–1812 " Contemporary and Historical Maps: Charlotte Small (S. Leanne Playter/Andreas N. Korsos|Publisher: Arcturus Consulting)
- 2006/2007: "David Thompson in Alberta 1787–1812"; "David Thompson on the Columbia River 1807–1812"; "The Explorations and Travels of David Thompson 1784–1812"; "Posts and Forts of the North American Fur Trade 1600–1870" Contemporary and Historical Maps: David Thompson (Andreas N. Korsos|Publisher: Arcturus Consulting)
- 2010 : Official Documentary of Thompson was released by national geographic, ca.

== Notes ==
- Jenish, D'Arcy (2003). Epic wanderer: David Thompson and the mapping of the Canadian West. Toronto: Doubleday Canada. ISBN 978-0-385-65973-4.
- Thompson, David (1994). Columbia Journals. Montreal: McGill-Queen's University Press. ISBN 978-0-7735-0989-4.
- "David Thompson Canada's greatest Geographer". David Thompson Things. Archived from the original on 23 January 2008.
- "The Explorations and Travels of David Thompson 1784–1812" (Map). Andreas N. Korsos. Arcturus Consulting. 2007. ISBN 978-0-9783707-2-5. Archived from the original on 28 February 2009.
- 2006: "Moccasin Miles – The Travels of Charlotte Small Thompson 1799–1812" Contemporary and Historical Maps: Charlotte Small (S. Leanne Playter/Andreas N. Korsos|Publisher: Arcturus Consulting)
