= Howse Pass =

Pass through the Rocky Mountains in Canada

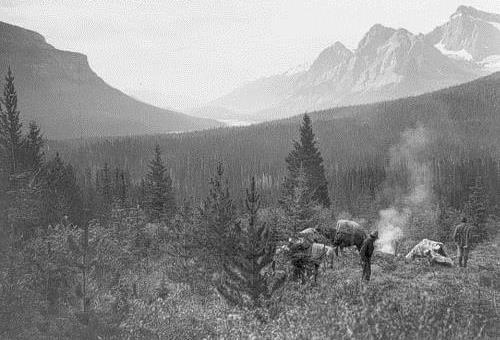
- A camp in the Howse Pass in 1902

- Location within Alberta Location within British Columbia Location within Canada
- Elevation: 1,539 m (5,049 ft)

Location
- Location: Alberta–British Columbia border, Canada
- Range: Canadian Rockies
- Coordinates: 51°48′N 116°45′W
- Topo map: NTS 82N15 Mistaya Lake

National Historic Site of Canada
- Official name: Howse Pass National Historic Site of Canada
- Designated: 1978

Howse Pass (el. 1,539 m or 5,049 ft) is a pass through the Rocky Mountains in Canada. The pass is located in Banff National Park, between Mount Conway and Howse Peak.

== History ==
The pass was used by First Nations people such as the Kootenay (Ktunaxa) to the west and Peigan (Pikani) to the east. In 1806 two men from Rocky Mountain House cut a rough road from the Howse River toward the pass. In June 1807 David Thompson crossed it to the Columbia River. It was named for Joseph Howse, a Hudson's Bay Company factor who crossed it later, in 1809. The pass was not much used, Athabasca Pass being preferred.

The pass was designated a National Historic Site of Canada in 1978.

== Geography ==
From Howse Pass, waters flow east via Conway Creek, Howse River, North Saskatchewan River to Lake Winnipeg and Hudson Bay. To the west it drains by the Blaeberry River to the Columbia River and on to the Pacific Ocean.

Howse Pass is lower than many other passes in this range and it was considered for the Canadian Pacific's route, but Kicking Horse Pass was chosen instead. There has been some talk of building a road through the pass from Saskatchewan River Crossing to Golden, British Columbia, but this would involve cutting through the national park.

== Gallery ==
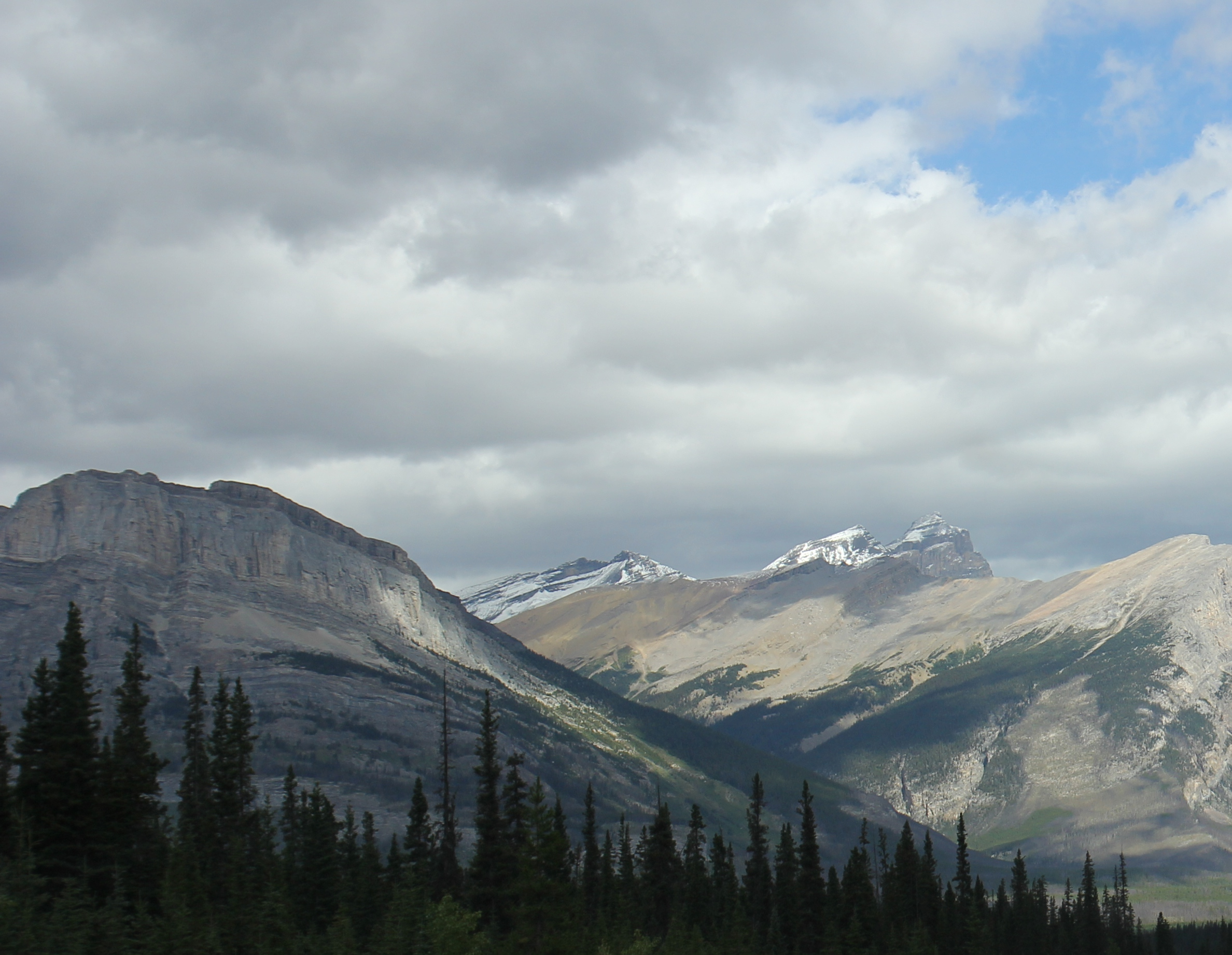
Howse Pass from below

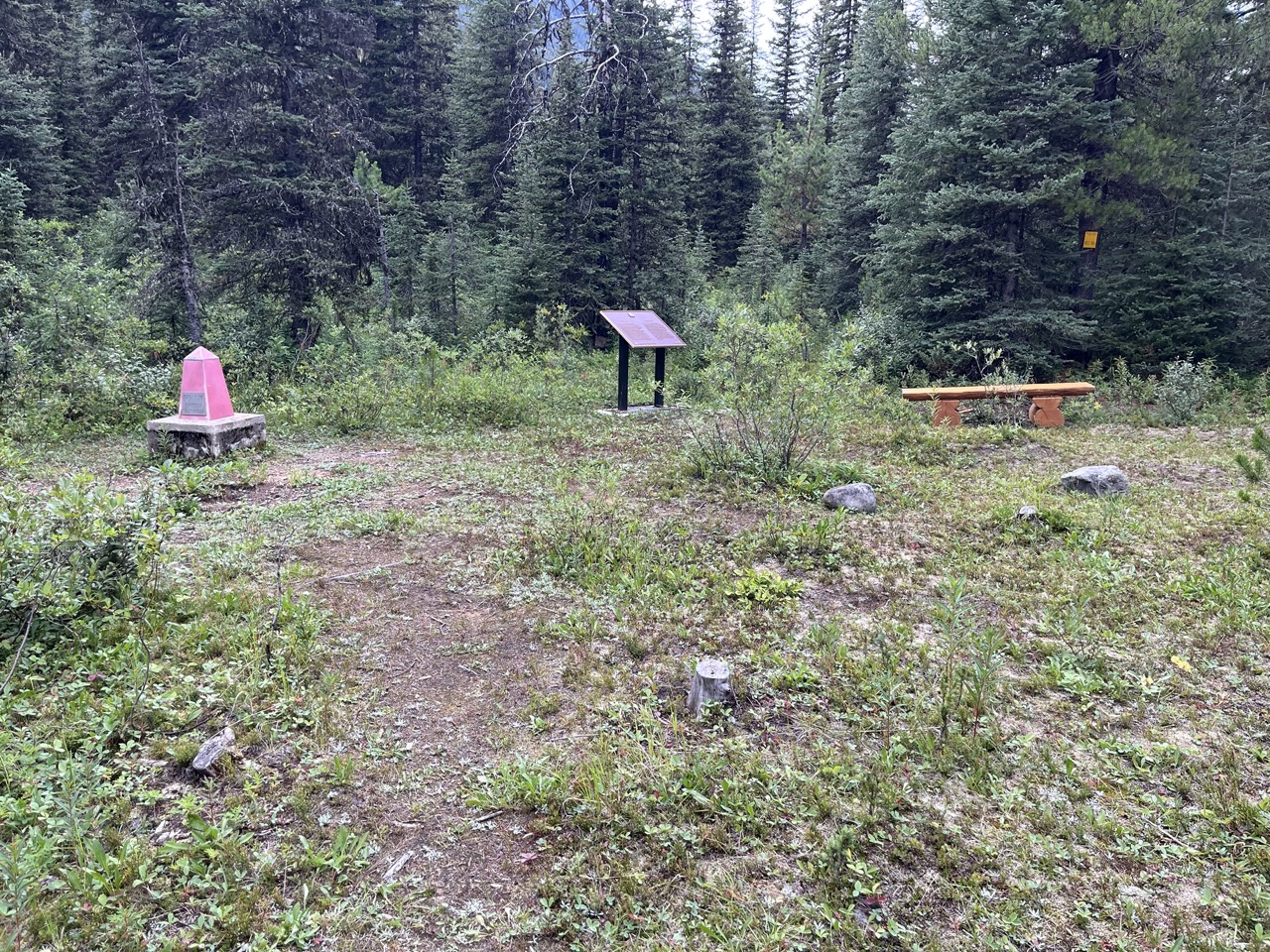
Howse Pass in August 2025

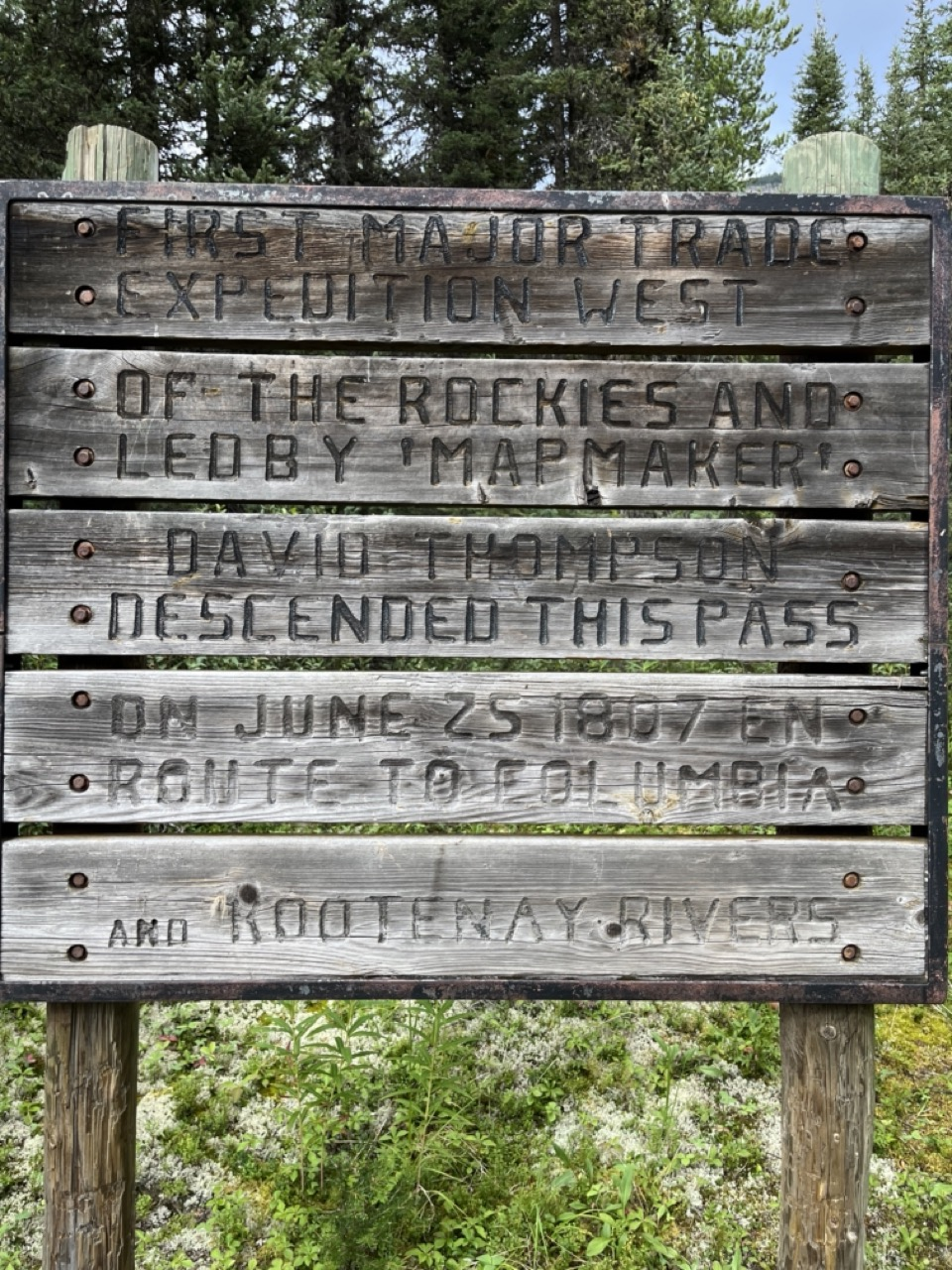
An informational sign at Howse Pass

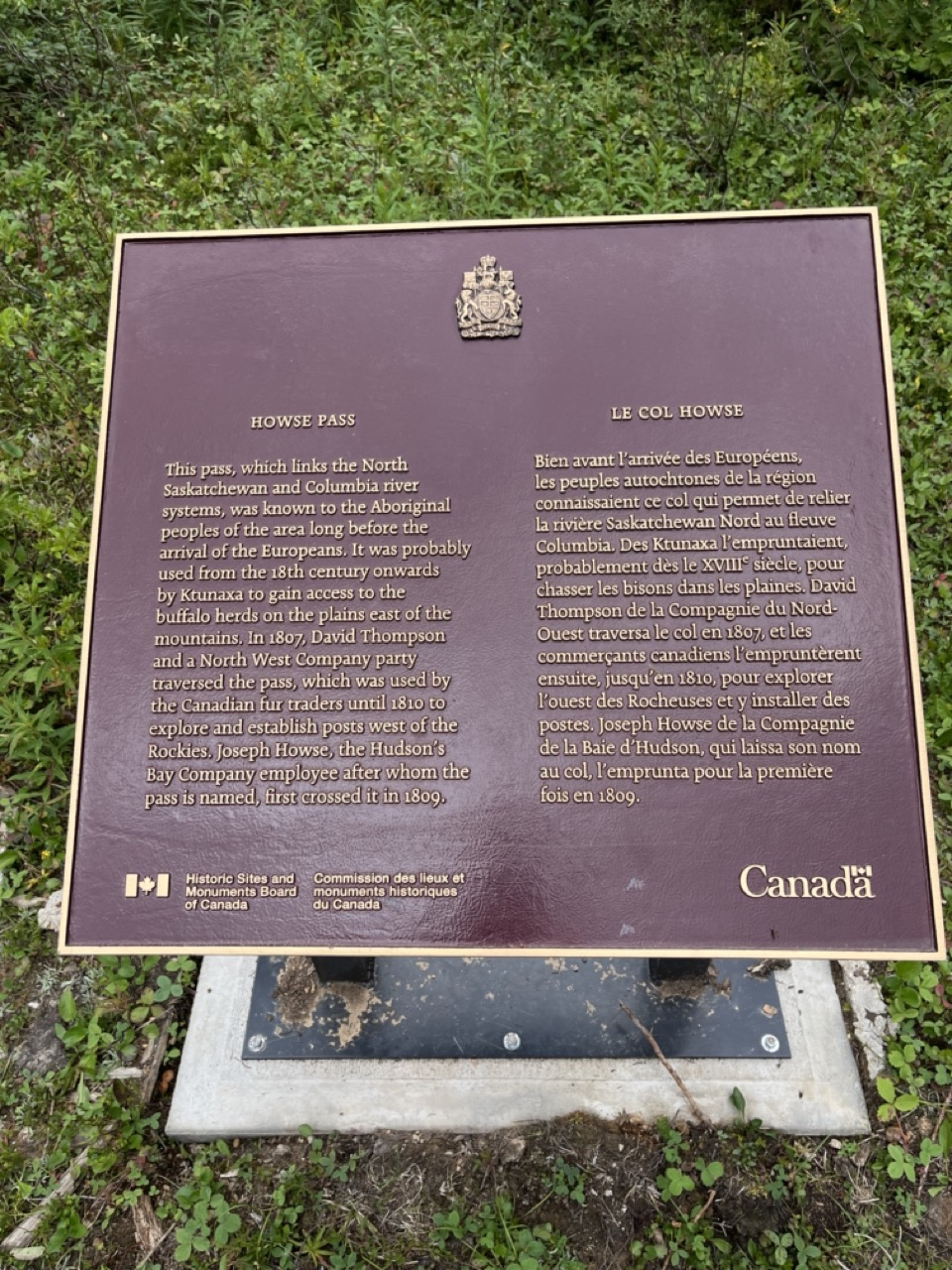
The National Historic Sites plaque at Howse Pass

== See also ==
- List of Rocky Mountain passes on the continental divide
