= Crimson Lake Provincial Park =

Provincial park in Alberta, Canada

- IUCN category IV (habitat/species management area)
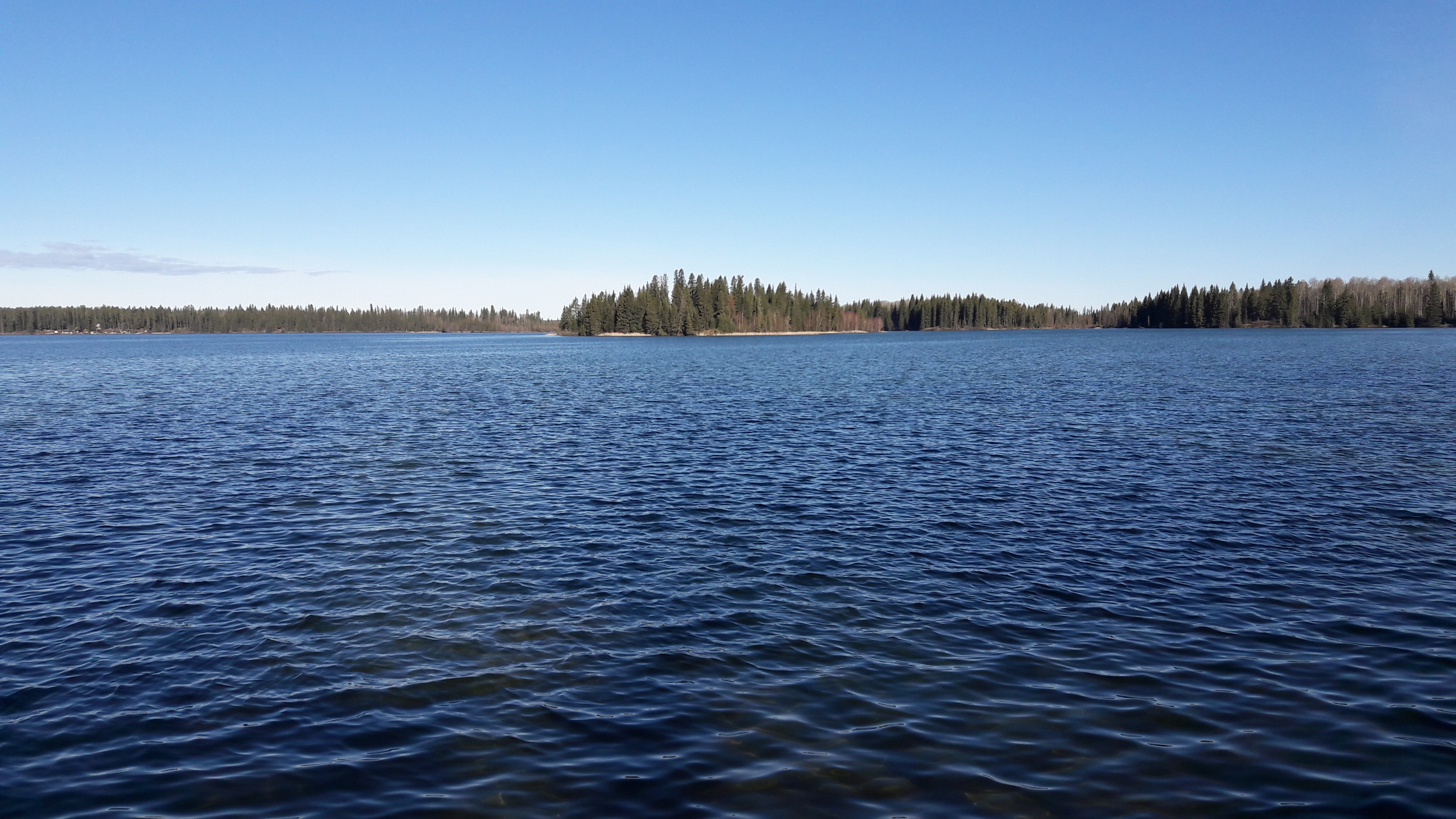
- Crimson Lake

- Location within Alberta
- Interactive map of Crimson Lake Provincial Park
- Location: Clearwater County, Alberta, Canada
- Nearest city: Rocky Mountain House
- Coordinates: 52°27′57″N 115°02′44″W
- Established: November 22, 1955
- Governing body: Alberta Tourism, Parks and Recreation

Crimson Lake Provincial Park is a provincial park located in Alberta, Canada, 14 kilometres (8.7 mi) west of Rocky Mountain House, off the David Thompson Highway along secondary highway 756.

Crimson Lake received its name from the striking colours of the setting sun reflecting on the surface of its waters seen by an earlier trapper. It is a small, clear, shallow lake set in the meeting spot of foothills pine forests, aspen parkland, bog and muskeg ecosystems. Located on the northeast shore of the lake is Pioneer Ranch Camp, a Christian summer camp within the park's boundaries.

== Recreational activities ==
Crimson Lake Provincial Parks offers many recreational activities. There is a public access, groomed beach along the shores of Crimson Lake. Located very near to the beach is a public campground and numerous day access areas.

Crimson Lake offers an excellent location for kayaking, canoeing and boating. Occasionally, one might observe a wind surfer or sailboat out on the water. Water skiing, tubing and swimming are common though the lake does boast a flourishing leech population. There are public, roped off swim areas adjacent to the public beach. Life guards are not on duty. In the day use area in which the public beach is located, there is also a playground, numerous fire pits and picnic sites and a beach volleyball court.

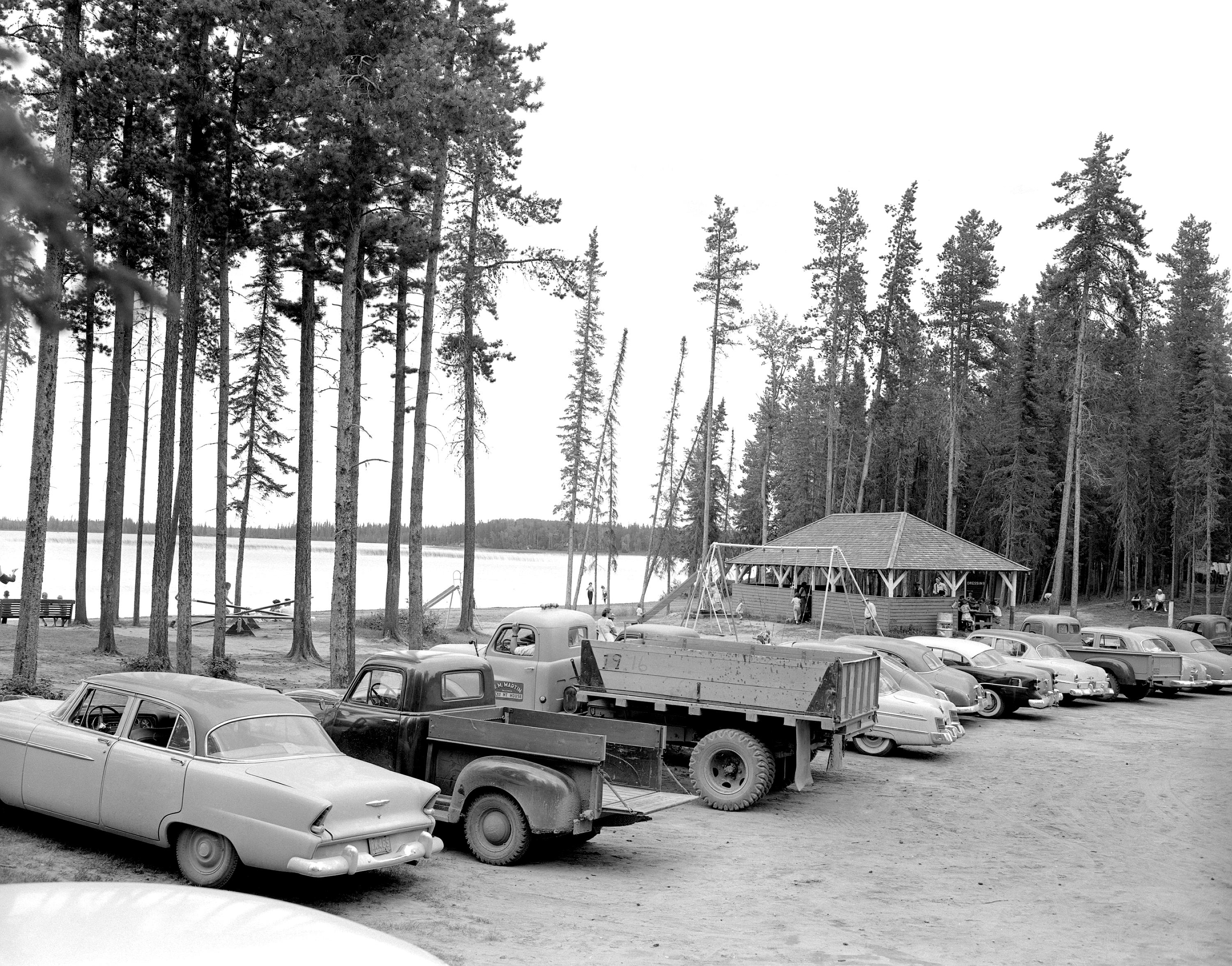
Crimson Lake Provincial Park, 1955

Twin Lakes offers fishing, ice fishing and boating. Fish species include Fathead Minnow, Northern Pike, Pearl Dave, Rainbow Trout, White Sucker, and Yellow Perch.

Crimson Lake's campground offers 169 units. Equipped with showers, washrooms, firewood, a playground, boat launch and sewage disposal, 62 of the campsites have power hookups. Recycling bins are located at garbage stations. Pets must be kept on leashes. Fire wood can be bought daily and cutting from live trees can result in a fine. There are three picnic shelters and four creative play areas.

Twin Lakes campsite is smaller and offers a more rustic approach with 25 treed campsites and 14 overflow sites. A boardwalk is located along the lakeshore and a hiking trail leads to Crimson Lake, 6.5 km away.

== Trail system ==
Over 20 km of trails are maintained surrounding the lake. The Amerada Trail is a 10 km gravel trail that loops the entire lake. It passes through wetlands, sandhills and forest and many benches and viewpoints of the lake can be found. The Boardwalk section is a wooden walkway that traverses the wetlands and forest right along the lakefront and is an excellent area for birdwatching. All sections of the boardwalk link to the Amerada Trail. In total, this trail system is 15 km in length. The third trail goes from Crimson Lake to the town of Rocky Mountain House, passing through Twin lakes. It is a 15 km route that has a gravel surface and traverses through wetlands, and forest with some hillier sections. In the spring, summer and fall, these trails are commonly used for hiking, walking and mountain biking while in the winter they can be used for cross country skiing. All trails except te Amerada Loop, Lakeshore Beaver Run and Trembling Trees trails are groomed in the winter.

== Wildlife ==
Bird watching in the reeds along the lakeside is common as the park has populations of sandhill cranes, boreal owls, northern pygmy-owls, greater yellowlegs, western tangers and solitary sandpipers. Fish species in Twin Lakes include Fathead Minnow, Northern Pike, Pearl Dave, Rainbow Trout, White Sucker, and Yellow Perch.

In the summer months, black bears are frequent within the park and nearby areas. Occasionally grizzly bears are sighted as well. Bear safety is important and park conservation officers are available to share information and safety brochures. Moose and deer are abundant and commonly viewed. The area also has beaver, red squirrel, shrew and occasionally cougars.

== See also ==
- List of provincial parks in Alberta
- List of Canadian provincial parks
- List of National Parks of Canada

Boating is a very common pastime on Crimson Lake. Because Crimson lake is located in a marshy landscape the leach population is high but that does not stop people from swimming.
