= Raven River =

Raven River South Raven River
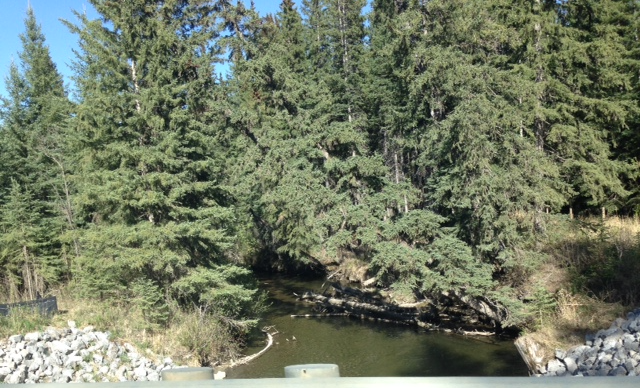
- Taken from a bridge soon before the North Raven River flows into the river. Much of the river is located in a heavily forested valley

Location
- Country: Canada
- Province: Alberta

Physical characteristics
- Mouth
  - location: Red Deer River near Gleniffer Lake
  - coordinates: 52°01′57″N 114°22′02″W
- Length: 450 km (280 mi)watershed
- Basin size: 1,113.37 km^{2} (429.87 sq mi)
- Discharge
  - location: Below the confluence of the Raven River and the North Raven River
  - average: 1-3 m^{3}/s April - October (can historically deviate by 1 m^{3}/s)
  - maximum: over 30 m^{3}/s

Basin features
- River system: Red Deer River
- Tributaries
  - left: North Raven River
  - right: Beaver Creek: Beaver Lake; Schrader Creek; Crooked Creek

The Raven River or South Raven River is a major tributary of the Red Deer River located in Central-Western Alberta, Canada. The river is located in both the Clearwater County and Red Deer County.

== Course ==
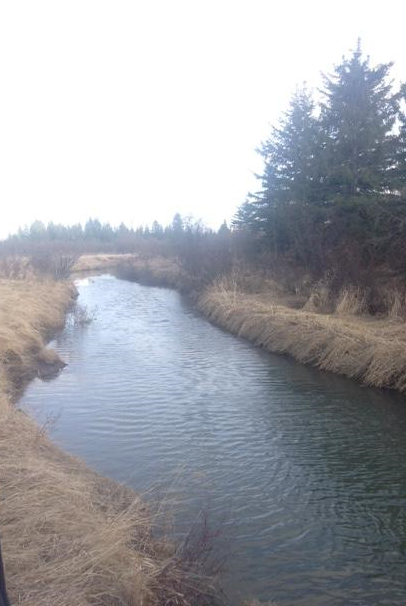
The North Raven River

The river begins somewhere in the western Alberta foothills. Many small tributaries form the river there. The river flows in an eastern direction. The river passes near Burnstick Lake (both the town and the lake), and then passes very closely to the Clearwater River, which is part of a different watershed altogether. It passes near the Clearwater Ricinus Natural Area. The river then starts to follow closely to Alberta Highway 54, yet never being crossed by it. It passes near Caroline and is joined by Beaver Creek which contains the artificial Beaver Lake. Alberta Highway 22 crosses the river. The river is then joined by the North Raven River at Raven and passes near the Raven Recreation Area before it sharply turns southwards. The river is joined by Crooked Creek near the Medicine River Wildlife Centre. The river then passes not far from Kevisville before emptying into the Red Deer River, which then enters into the artificial Gleniffer Lake formed by Dickson Dam.

== Fish species ==
Raven river, especially its tributary the North Raven River, is a very popular spot for anglers. Brook trout, longnose sucker, white sucker, and stocked brown trout are the predominant species of fish located in the river. Being a tributary of the Red Deer River, Raven River likely also contains northern pike, sauger, lake whitefish, yellow perch, burbot, lake sturgeon, mountain whitefish, goldeye, brown trout, bull trout, rainbow trout, brook trout, cutthroat trout, emerald shiner, river shiner, spottail shiner, flathead chub, longnose dace, quillback carpsucker, shorthead redhorse, silver redhorse, trout‐perch, spoonhead sculpine, lake chub, northern pearl dace, northern redbelly dace, finescale dace, fathead minnow, brook stickleback, and muskellunge.

== See also ==
- List of Alberta rivers
