= List of crossings of the Red Deer River =

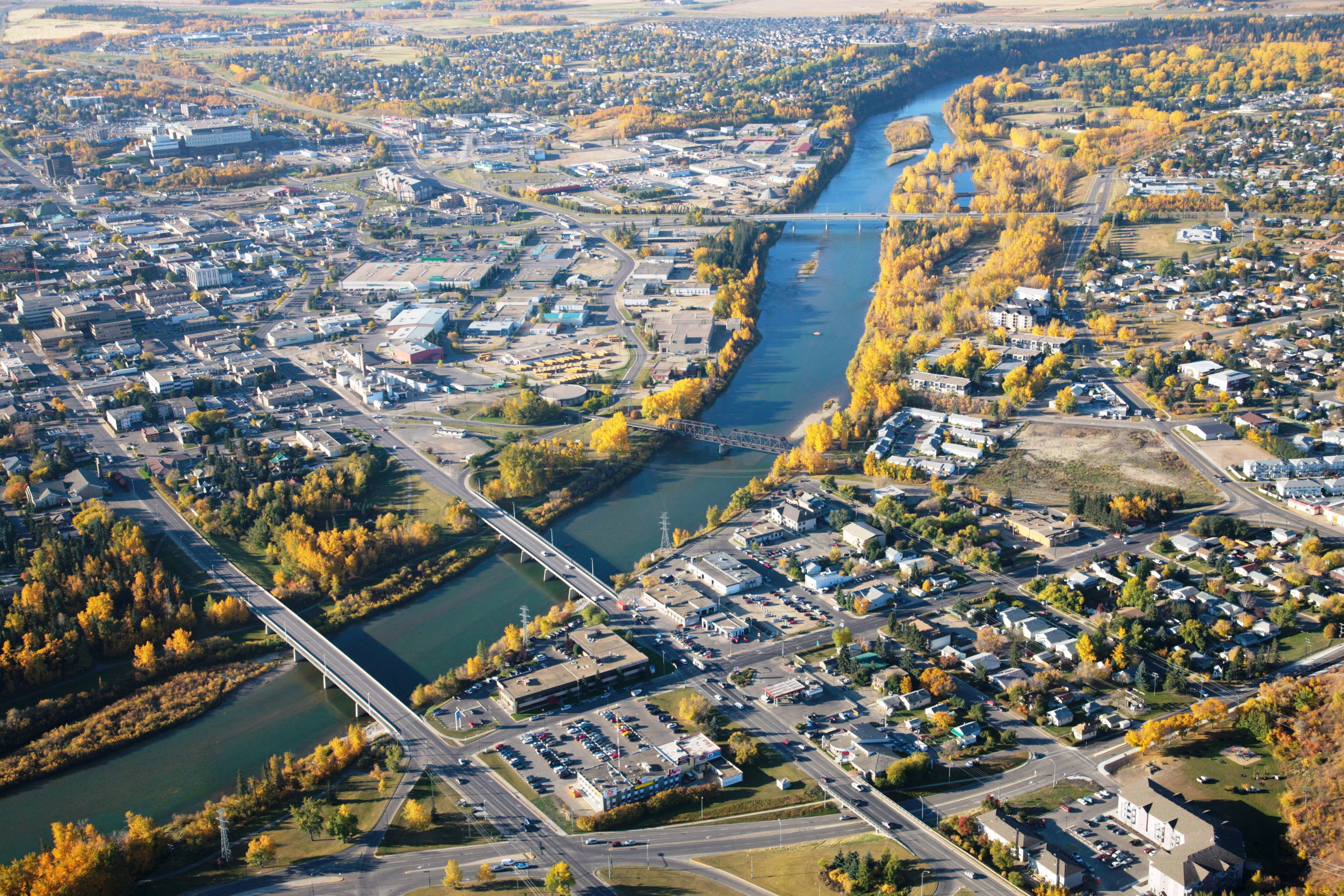
Bridges over the river in the city of Red Deer

This is a list of crossings of the Red Deer River in the Canadian province of Alberta from the river's origin in Sawback Range in Alberta to its mouth at the South Saskatchewan River in Saskatchewan. Even though the river flows through the province of Saskatchewan, there are no current crossings over the river in the province.

== Crossings in use ==
This is a list of crossings in use from upstream to downstream. Crossings include bridges, ferries, and dams (road, pedestrian, and railway).

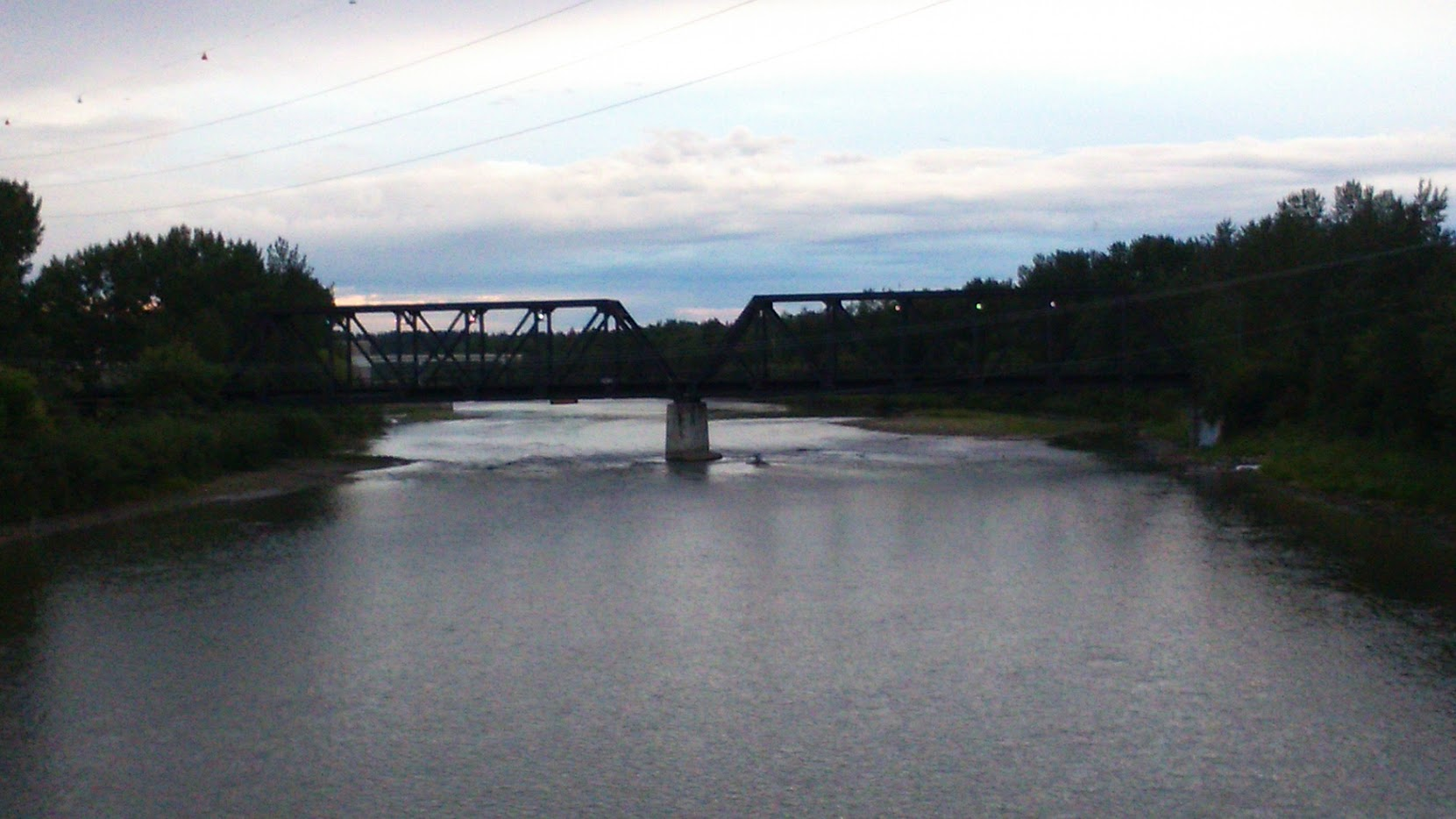
Old Red Deer CPR Bridge

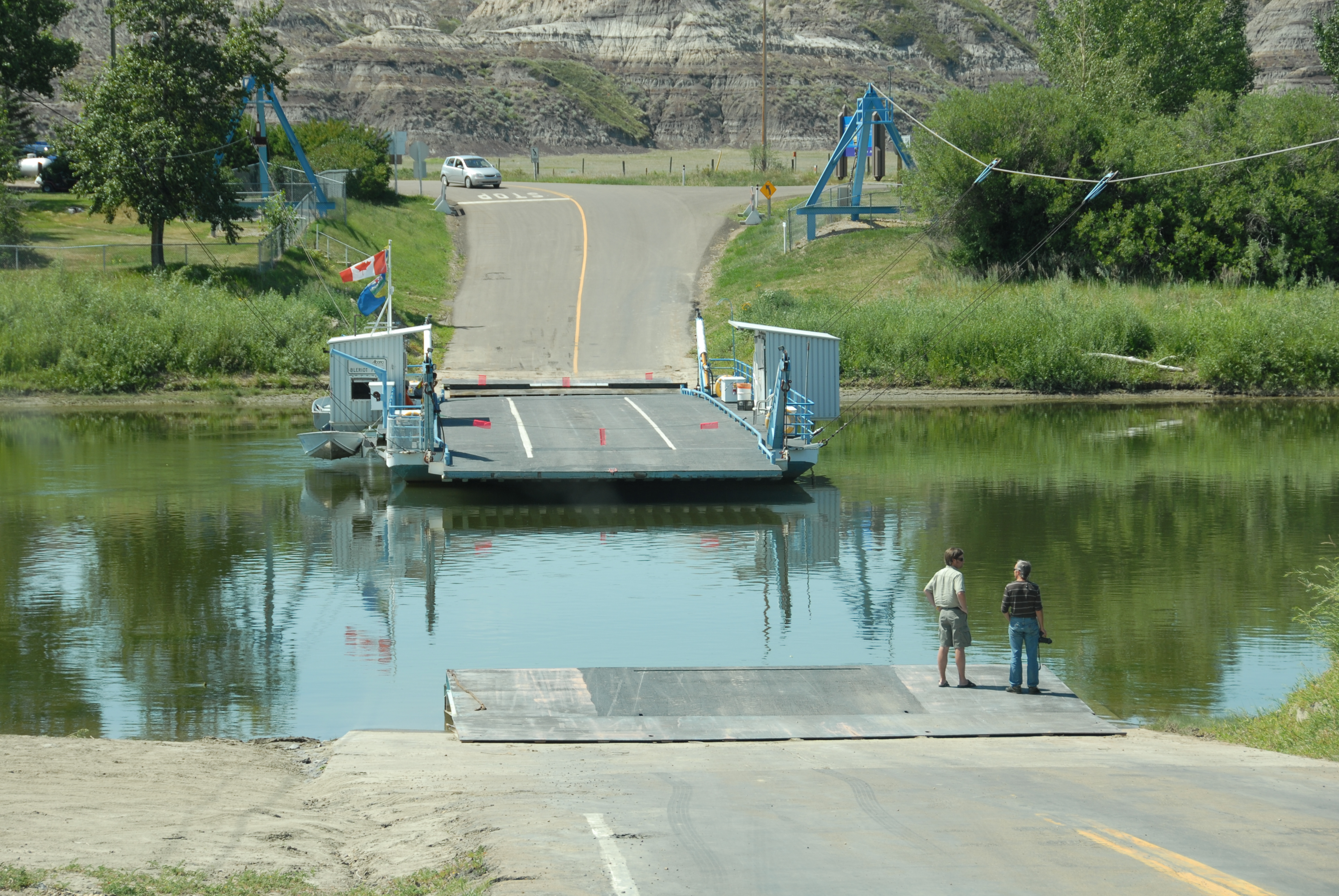
Bleriot Ferry

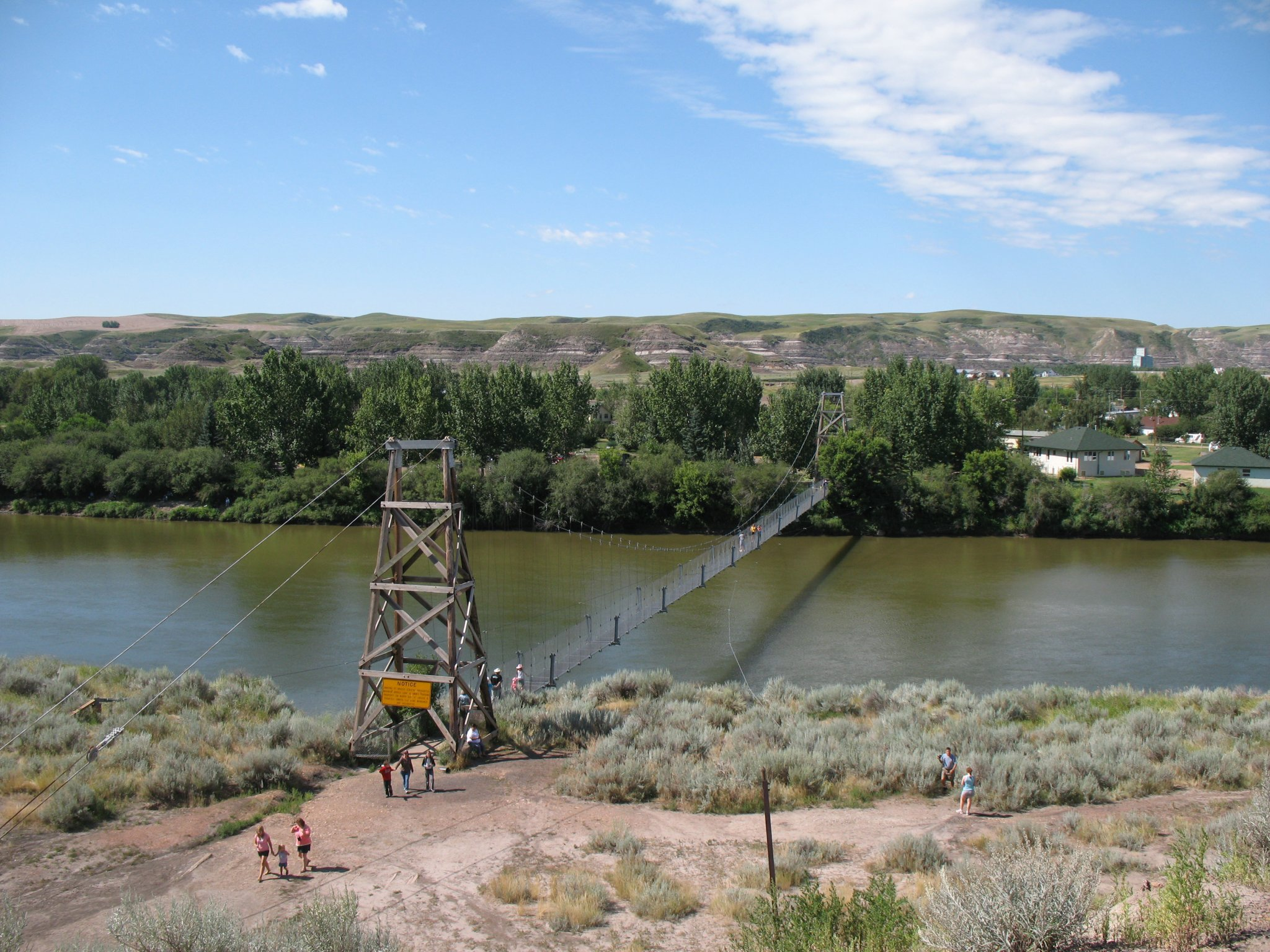
Star Mine Suspension Bridge

=== Alberta ===
Crossing	Carries	Location	Notes	Coordinates
Red Deer River mountain bridges	Ya Ha Tinda Road & Unmarked roads	Ya Ha Tinda area	There are many small unnamed/unmarked bridges over the river in this area.	51°N 115°W
Gravel highway bridge	Hwy 734	west of Red Deer Forestry Airport		51°39′26″N 115°17′13″W
Sundre Bridge	Hwy 27	Sundre		51°47′46″N 114°38′7″W
Garrington Bridge	Hwy 587	northwest of Garrington	Replaced after 2013 Alberta floods	51°56′35″N 114°29′0″W
Dickson Dam	Township Road 360	east of Dickson	Hydroelectric Dam creating Gleniffer Lake	52°3′15″N 114°12′46″W
Innisfail Bridge	Hwy 54	northwest of Innisfail		52°4′9″N 113°59′5″W
Penhold Bridge	Hwy 592	west of Penhold		52°8′38″N 113°58′5″W
Railway bridge	Canadian Pacific Railway	western Red Deer		52°16′4″N 113°51′50″W
Freeway bridge	Hwy 2	western Red Deer	4 lanes (2 bridges side-by-side)	52°16′6″N 113°51′46″W
Riverlands Pedestrian Bridge	Pedestrians and cyclists	Red Deer: Heritage Ranch		52°15′46″N 113°51′1″W
Temporary crossing	Construction crews, extension of Fountain Drive.	Red Deer: Great Chief Park	A temporary bridge and causeway was constructed over the river so that construction crews can access the other side.	52°15′46″N 113°50′14″W
Taylor Bridge	Taylor Drive	Red Deer: near Bower Ponds	4 lanes (separate bridges)	52°16′13″N 113°49′28″W
Old Red Deer Canadian Pacific Railway Bridge	Pedestrians and cyclists	Red Deer: near Riverside Industrial Park	Built in 1890 or 1891. Formerly a Canadian Pacific Railway Bridge (closed in 1991 and reopened in 1992). Replaced an old bridge.	52°16′32″N 113°49′1″W
Southbound Gaetz Ave Bridge	50 Ave (Gaetz Ave, Hwy 2A)	Red Deer: downtown	3 lanes southbound	52°16′36″N 113°48′50″W
Northbound Gaetz Ave Bridge	49 Ave (Gaetz Ave, Hwy 2A)	Red Deer: downtown	3 lanes northbound	52°16′38″N 113°48′42″W
67 Street Bridge	67 Street (Hwy 11)	Red Deer: Gaetz Lake Sanctuary	4 lanes (separate bridges)	52°17′16″N 113°47′49″W
River Bend Pedestrian Bridge	Pedestrians and cyclists	Red Deer: River Bend Golf Course		52°18′56″N 113°47′20″W
Joffre Bridge	Hwy 11	southwest of NOVA Chemicals Joffre site	Replaces old bridge	52°16′10″N 113°35′32″W
Ardley Railway Trestle	Canadian National Railway	southwest of Heatburg	Previously owned by the Grand Trunk Pacific Railway. Replaced an old bridge	52°18′12″N 113°14′57″W
Content Bridge	Hwy 21	southwest of Nevis		52°18′20″N 113°4′32″W
McKenzie Crossing	Hwy 590	west of Big Valley	1 lane wooden deck	52°1′31″N 112°56′53″W
Tolman Bridge	Hwy 585	Tolman		52°50′17″N 113°1′0″W
Morrin Bridge	Hwy 27	west of Morrin		51°39′2″N 111°54′11″W
Bleriot Ferry	Hwy 838	west of Munson	13 car capacity	51°34′22″N 112°53′6″W
Gordon Taylor Bridge	Hwy 9 & Hwy 56	Drumheller		51°28′3″N 112°42′43″W
Rosedale Bridge	Roper Road	Rosedale	1 lane wooden deck	51°25′16″N 112°37′44″W
Star Mine Suspension Bridge	Pedestrians	eastern Rosedale	A suspension bridge	51°25′12″N 112°36′52″W
Highway bridge	Hwy 10	between Cambria and Eladesor		51°23′55″N 112°35′27″W
Highway bridge	Hwy 10 & Hwy 569	north of Western Monarch		51°19′55″N 112°28′48″W
Dorothy Ferry Bridge	Hwy 848	near Dorothy	1 lane wooden deck. This crossing was previously a ferry.	51°16′49″N 112°19′52″W
Finnegan Ferry	Hwy 862	near Finnegan	13 car capacity	51°7′31″N 112°5′11″W
Emerson Bridge	Hwy 36	north of Duchess		50°55′6″N 111°53′52″W
Steveville Bridge	Hwy 876	near Steveville		50°50′18″N 111°36′54″W
Jenner Bridge	Hwy 884	southeast of Howie	wooden deck. Formerly a ferry.	50°50′17″N 111°10′36″W
Gravel highway bridge	Hwy 886	north of Buffalo	1 lane wooden deck.	50°50′17″N 111°10′36″W
Highway bridge	Hwy 41	northeast of Sharrow		50°56′2″N 110°9′1″W
Empress Bridge	Hwy 899	near Empress		50°57′53″N 110°1′42″W

=== Saskatchewan ===
There are currently no crossings in Saskatchewan.

== Crossings no longer in use ==
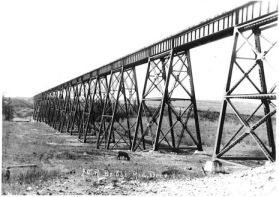
The Mintlaw Viaduct

This is a list of notable crossings that are no longer in use that are not already listed above. Although there are quite a few crossings of the Red Deer River that are no longer in use, there are only a few worth mentioning.

Crossing	Carried	Location	Notes	Coordinates
Mintlaw Viaduct	Alberta Central & Canadian Pacific Railway	south of Mintlaw	Closed in 1983.	52°12′28″N 113°54′51″W
Railway bridge	Canadian National Railway - Canadian Northern Western Railway	Red Deer near Waskasoo Creek	Closed in 1941. Collapsed.	52°16′42″N 113°48′17″W
Midland Railway Bridge	Canadian National Railway - Goose Lake Line	northwestern Drumheller	Closed in 2010. Last train across in 2014.	51°27′52″N 112°45′29″W
East Coulee Coal Railway Bridge	Canadian Pacific Railway and some Canadian National Railway traffic	near East Coulee	Closed sometime in the 1970s or 1980s	51°19′59″N 112°29′14″W
Bullpound Railway Bridge	Canadian Pacific Railway	near Bullpound	Closed sometime around 1980	51°4′44″N 111°59′14″W

== Proposed crossings ==
Crossing	Carries	Location	Notes	Coordinates
Freeway bridge	North Highway Connector (Alberta Highway 11A)	Red Deer near Wastewater Treatment Plant	Built in the next 2 to 5 years.	52°18′36″N 113°47′17″W
