= North Raven River =

North Raven River Stauffer Creek
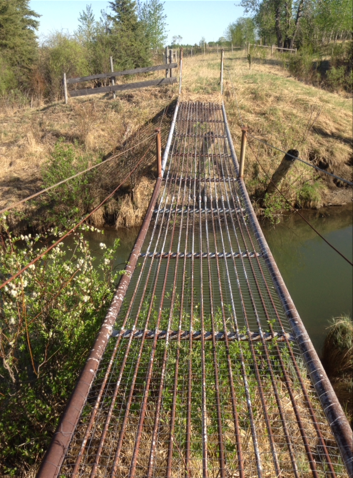
- Suspension bridge over the river

Location
- Country: Canada

Physical characteristics
- Mouth
  - location: Raven River at the Raven Recreation Area near Raven and the Alberta Highway 54 crossing.
  - coordinates: 52°05′33″N 114°30′04″W

Basin features
- River system: Red Deer River

The North Raven River or Stauffer Creek is a major tributary of the Raven River located in western Central Alberta, Canada. It is located in the Red Deer River system. The river is a popular place for anglers.

== Course ==
The river begins somewhere in western Central Alberta after the confluence of small tributaries. The source is located near Butte, Caroline, and is not far from the Clearwater River, which is part of a different watershed altogether. The river flows east until it is crossed by Alberta Highway 761 near Stauffer, where it heads in a southeasterly direction. The river then sharply turns south near Hale Lake. The river is then crossed by at the Alberta Highway 54. Soon afterwards, the river flows into the Raven River or the South Raven River at the Raven Recreation Area near Raven and the Alberta Highway 54 crossing. The Raven River then flows into the Red Deer River.

== Fish species ==
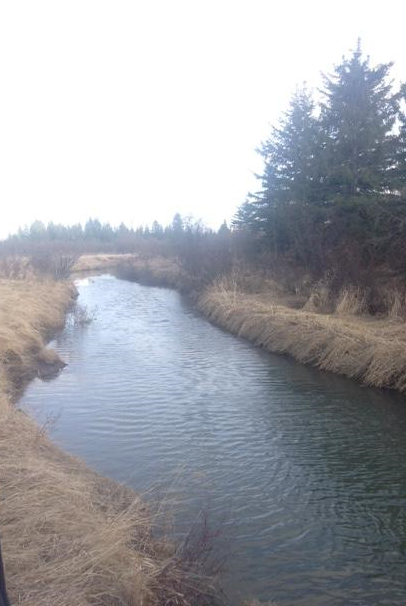
The North Raven River

North Raven River is a very popular spot for anglers, and considered one of the best in Alberta. Brook trout, longnose sucker, white sucker, and stocked brown trout are the predominant species of fish located in the river. Being a part the Red Deer River system, the North Raven River may also contain northern pike, sauger, lake whitefish, yellow perch, burbot, lake sturgeon, mountain whitefish, goldeye, brown trout, bull trout, rainbow trout, brook trout, cutthroat trout, emerald shiner, river shiner, spottail shiner, flathead chub, longnose dace, quillback carpsucker, shorthead redhorse, silver redhorse, trout‐perch, spoonhead sculpine, lake chub, northern pearl dace, northern redbelly dace, finescale dace, fathead minnow, brook stickleback, and muskellunge.

== See also ==
- List of Alberta rivers
