= Dickson, Alberta =

Dickson
- Hamlet
- Location of Dickson Dickson (Canada)
- Coordinates: 52°03′24″N 114°18′29″W
- Country: Canada
- Province: Alberta
- Region: Central Alberta
- Census division: 8
- Municipal district: Red Deer County

Government
  - Type: Unincorporated
  - Governing body: Red Deer County Council

Area (2021)
  - Land: 0.16 km^{2} (0.062 sq mi)

Population (2021)
  - Total: 50
  - Density: 304.3/km^{2} (788/sq mi)
- Time zone: UTC−06:00 (Alberta Time)
- Area codes: 403, 587, 825

Dickson is a hamlet in central Alberta, Canada within Red Deer County. It is located approximately 25 kilometres (16 mi) west of Innisfail near the Dickson Dam and Gleniffer Lake. It is within Census Division No. 8.

== History ==
In the fall of 1902, a number of men living in and around Blair and Omaha, Nebraska, decided to establish homesteads in Western Canada. An agent from the Canadian government advised the men to settle in Alberta because of the many acres of land available from the Canadian government. As a result of this encounter, the agent set aside a tract of land approximately 20 miles (32 km) west of Innisfail, for the purpose of the settlement. Two of these men, Henry and Jim Larsen, traveled to Alberta to inspect the prospective homesteads for farming suitability. Once they arrived, they were satisfied with the rich farmland and returned home to Nebraska to organize their departure.

The Danish settlers first move was to organize a congregation of the Danish Evangelical Lutheran Church (Pella Congregation). Once this was established, the first settlers to leave were Fred Pedersen, John Jensen and Laus Christensen in March 1903; a second group left in June. On July 1, 1903, their rail car arrived in Calgary, Alberta. By the second week of July, the newcomers had pitched their tents, each on their own homestead. By agreement, the families with children occupied one section, so the women could be near one another.

The original settlement of Dickson was composed of 17 Danish individuals. As a result, the Dickson area became the first Danish settlement in Western Canada. The settlers arrived in hopes of owning land and establishing a future for their families. Like most homesteaders, they experienced many hardships. The homesteaders were physically isolated in terms of distance, rough trails, and, to a degree, by their language and religion. Many of the settlers did not speak English and communicated only in Danish. This resulted in the preservation of their Danish heritage, as they did not feel the need to learn English or adjust to Canadian cultural ways of life because they were the only settlers in the area. Also, all religious services were conducted in Danish and as the church was the seat of power and authority in the community, going against the church would create conflict. Yet despite all of their troubles, they worked together to build the hamlet of Dickson.

In 1904, three new families arrived - I.C. Tromberg, Anton Laursen and Reverend J.C. Gundesen. In February 1905, a post office was installed in Carl Christiansen's home, with Carl as the postmaster. By this act, the area of Dickson was put on the map. From 1905 to 1910, there was an influx of families and individuals who took up homesteads to the west of the original settlers. Most of them were Lutheran and, in 1907, a new congregation was organized: the Bethany Lutheran Congregation. The church then became the spiritual, social and recreation centre of the community. Its activities were limited largely to those of Danish origin, which was a strength and weakness at that time. In 1909, four buildings - a store, church, school and parsonage - composed the hamlet of Dickson. In 1911, a new church was finished and dedicated, becoming the first Danish Lutheran Church in Western Canada. The Dickson store then became the centre of the community with customers stopping by for supplies. In return for essential supplies from Carl Christiansen, settlers bartered farm produce and lumber. The general store continued to operate as a family business until 1980.

After the original group of settlers of Danish descent settled in Dickson, there was a so-called second wave of Danes who took up land on Townships 35 and 36 north of the Red Deer River, west of the 5th meridian. The main incentive for new immigrants to come to the area was the Lutheran Church, productive black land and the hospitable people in the area. Land around Dickson was low lying but sloped to the east. Starting in 1917, the Drainage District #7 was formed including 96 quarter sections (15,000 acres). At the 25th anniversary of the Dickson area there was 142 residents, some being from the neighboring Kevisville area to the west. In the late 1920s and into the 1930s several farm families came directly from Denmark. A high school was formed in 1929 (one of the first rural high schools) and in 1933 a girls’ dormitory was built to house young ladies attending high school in Dickson. The active church community and educational components such as the Luther League, skating rink, Boy Scouts, choir and the Fish and Game Association made the Dickson area attractive to further settlement. During the Great Depression, farmers in the area continued to thrive because of the rich soil and frequent rains. It was also advantageous that the Markerville creamery was nearby. Over the years, highlights for the Church community were; planting spruce trees around the hamlet (1929), starting a Bible camp at Sylvan Lake (1933), built new church (1967), arena built (1980), largest rural Lutheran congregation in Canada (1983) and the Danish Queen visit (1991). Dickson continues to be a very productive and progressive farming area. The Lutheran Church, arena, Danish Canadian Museum and Dickson Store Museum makes the community an interesting and busy place.

== Demographics ==
In the 2021 Census of Population conducted by Statistics Canada, Dickson had a population of 50 living in 24 of its 25 total private dwellings, a change of −13.8% from its 2016 population of 58. With a land area of 0.16 km^{2} (0.062 sq mi), it had a population density of 312.5/km^{2} (809.4/sq mi) in 2021.

As a designated place in the 2016 Census of Population conducted by Statistics Canada, Dickson had a population of 58 living in 25 of its 30 total private dwellings, a change of −3.3% from its 2011 population of 60. With a land area of 0.16 km^{2} (0.062 sq mi), it had a population density of 362.5/km^{2} (938.9/sq mi) in 2016.

== See also ==
- List of communities in Alberta
- List of designated places in Alberta
- List of hamlets in Alberta

== Bibliography ==
- Dickson, Alberta, Bethany Lutheran Congregation (1948). Dickson Koloniens historie et mindeskrift om vore pionerer. Blair, Nebraska: Lutheran Pub. House.
