= Martins Trailer Court, Alberta =

Martins Trailer Court
- Designated place
- Location of Martins Trailer Court Martins Trailer Court (Canada)
- Coordinates: 52.360°N 115.017°W
- Country: Canada
- Province: Alberta
- Region: Central Alberta
- Census division: 9
- Municipal district: Clearwater County, Alberta

Government
  - Type: Unincorporated
  - Governing body: Clearwater County, Alberta Council

Area (2021)
  - Land: 0.94 km^{2} (0.36 sq mi)

Population (2021)
  - Total: 114
  - Density: 121.8/km^{2} (315/sq mi)
- Time zone: UTC−06:00 (Alberta Time)
- Area codes: 403, 587, 825

Martins Trailer Court is an unincorporated community in Alberta, Canada within Clearwater County that is recognized as a designated place by Statistics Canada. It is located on the south side of Township Road 393A, 0.8 km (0.50 mi) west of Highway 11A.

== Demographics ==
In the 2021 Census of Population conducted by Statistics Canada, Martins Trailer Court had a population of 114 living in 52 of its 54 total private dwellings, a change of 9.6% from its 2016 population of 104. With a land area of 0.94 km^{2} (0.36 sq mi), it had a population density of 121.3/km^{2} (314.1/sq mi) in 2021.

As a designated place in the 2016 Census of Population conducted by Statistics Canada, Martins Trailer Court had a population of 104 living in 46 of its 48 total private dwellings, a change of −16.8% from its 2011 population of 125. With a land area of 0.94 km^{2} (0.36 sq mi), it had a population density of 110.6/km^{2} (286.6/sq mi) in 2016.

== See also ==
- List of communities in Alberta
- List of designated places in Alberta
