= Spruce View =

- Hamlet
- Location within Red Deer County Location within Alberta
- Coordinates: 52°05′08″N 114°18′37″W
- Country: Canada
- Province: Alberta
- Region: Central Alberta
- Census division: No. 8
- Municipal district: Red Deer County

Area (2021)
  - Land: 0.69 km^{2} (0.27 sq mi)

Population (2021)
  - Total: 138
  - Density: 200.3/km^{2} (519/sq mi)
- Time zone: UTC−06:00 (Alberta Time)
- Postal code: T0M 1V0
- Area codes: 403, 587
- Highways: Hwy 54

Spruce View is a hamlet in central Alberta, Canada within Red Deer County. It is located on Highway 54, approximately 30 kilometres (19 mi) west of Innisfail. Spruce View is also recognized by Statistics Canada as a designated place.

== Demographics ==
In the 2021 Census of Population conducted by Statistics Canada, Spruce View had a population of 138 living in 64 of its 73 total private dwellings, a change of −21.1% from its 2016 population of 175. With a land area of 0.69 km^{2} (0.27 sq mi), it had a population density of 200.0/km^{2} (518.0/sq mi) in 2021.

As a designated place in the 2016 Census of Population conducted by Statistics Canada, Spruce View had a population of 175 living in 73 of its 84 total private dwellings, a change of 7.4% from its 2011 population of 163. With a land area of 0.69 km^{2} (0.27 sq mi), it had a population density of 253.6/km^{2} (656.9/sq mi) in 2016.

== See also ==
- List of communities in Alberta
- List of designated places in Alberta
- List of hamlets in Alberta
