= Antler Hill =

Summit in south central Alberta, Canada

Coordinates: 52.06681°N 113.88529°W

Antler Hill is a summit in south central Alberta, Canada. It is the highest point along the route between Edmonton and Calgary, just north of Innisfail.

Antler Hill's name is an accurate preservation of its native Cree name.
