= Mintlaw Viaduct =

Mintlaw Trestle
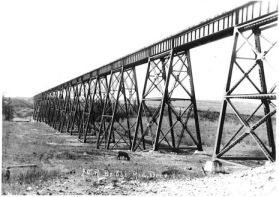
- The Mintlaw Trestle
- Coordinates: 52°12′28″N 113°54′52″W
- Carries: Railway
- Crosses: Red Deer River
- Locale: Mintlaw, Alberta
- Official name: Mintlaw Trestle

Characteristics
- Total length: 644 m (2,112 ft)
- Height: 34 m (110 ft)
- Longest span: 46 m (150 ft) truss span

History
- Constructed by: Alberta Central Railway
- Opened: 1912
- Closed: 1983

Location
- Interactive map of Mintlaw Trestle

The Mintlaw Trestle is an abandoned steel and wooden railway trestle that was built over the Red Deer River by the Alberta Central Railway near Mintlaw, Alberta, in 1912. The last train to cross the bridge was in 1981, and the line and bridge was abandoned in 1983. The bridge is the second longest Canadian Pacific Railway bridge of its kind in Alberta. It is the longest and the highest bridge in Central Alberta. It is west of Tuttle, northwest of Penhold, southwest of Red Deer, northwest of Red Deer Airport, and near the intersection of the C & E Trail and McKenzie Road.

== History ==
The Alberta Central Railway was incorporated in 1901 by an act of parliament in Alberta. Construction by the Alberta Central Railway on the bridge started in 1911 just east of the now ghost town of Mintlaw (where a station was located) after Sir Wilfrid Laurier, the prime minister of Canada, visited Red Deer to drive the first spike into the railway. The bridge was completed in the autumn of 1912. After the Alberta Central Railway went bankrupt, the bridge was leased to the Canadian Pacific Railway, and the Alberta Central Railway was eventually bought by the Canadian Pacific Railway.

The last train to go across the bridge went across in 1981 before the line was abandoned in 1983. In 2009, Red Deer County purchased the bridge from the Canadian Pacific Railway for $1 as an important heritage landmark and as part of a possible future regional pedestrian and cycling trail. In late 2010, Red Deer County authorized $350,000 for maintenance on the west side of the bridge, and on the east side in 2014.

== See also ==
- List of bridges in Canada
- List of crossings of the Red Deer River
