= Ray Bennett =

Canadian ice hockey coach

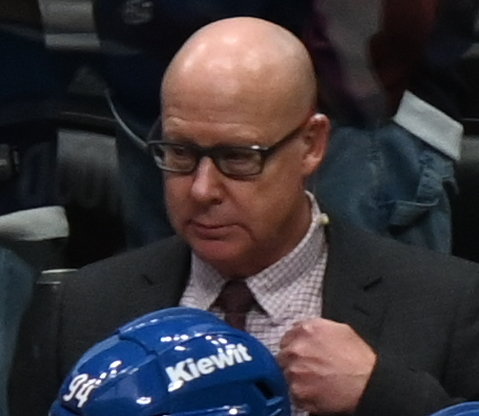
- Bennett in 2023
- Born: May 17, 1962 (age 64) Innisfail, Alberta, Canada
- Current NHL coach: Washington Capitals
- Coaching career: 1999–present

Ray Bennett (born May 17, 1962) is a Canadian ice hockey coach. He served as an assistant coach in the National Hockey League with the Los Angeles Kings from 1999 to 2006 and the St. Louis Blues from 2007-2017 and was an assistant coach with the Colorado Avalanche from 2017-2025. He was an assistant coach with the New York Islanders for their 2025-26 season. Ray is currently an assistant coach with the Washington Capitals.

Prior to joining the National Hockey League, Bennett served two seasons as the head coach of the Red Deer College men's ice hockey team.
