= Ya Ha Tinda Ranch =

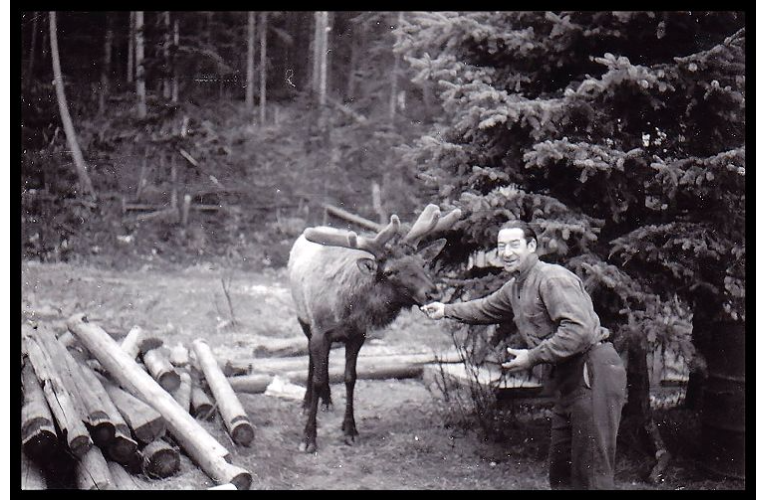
- Unidentified man feeding an elk on the ranch in 1949
- Coordinates: 51.753991080787124°N 115.5791760235605°W
- Established: 1917

Ya Ha Tinda Ranch is a ranch in Ya Ha Tinda Valley, Clearwater County, Alberta, Canada near the Alberta side of Banff National Park. The ranch is around 40 km^{2} (9748 acres, 3,945 hectares) with approximately one third being grassland and two thirds being forested. Around a thousand elk spend the winter in the ranch.

The ranch is owned by Parks Canada and used to raise horses for use in the western national parks that request mounted park rangers. Horses are raised for five years before being assigned to a national park. The ranch has around a hundred horses at peak time. Since its creation in 1917, the bounds of the park have frequently changed. Originally, the ranch was within Rocky Mountains National Park boundaries.

== History ==
Prehistoric bison remains indicates the area around the ranch has been used by native people for over 9,400 years. Ya Ha Tinda means "mountain prairie" in the Nakoda language.

In the early 1900s Brewster's Travel obtained a grazing lease on the site of the future ranch and, by 1908, were raising horses there. In 1917, Parks Canada began exclusively using the site to train horses.
