= Raven, Alberta =

Unincorporated community in Alberta, Canada

Coordinates: 52°05′28″N 114°28′37″W

Location of Raven Alberta

Raven is an unincorporated community in central Alberta within Red Deer County, located on Highway 54, 50 kilometres (31 mi) southwest of Red Deer. The Raven River flows near it.
