= Withrow, Alberta =

Withrow
- Hamlet
- Location of Withrow Withrow (Canada)
- Coordinates: 52°23′N 114°30′W
- Country: Canada
- Province: Alberta
- Region: Central Alberta
- Census division: 9
- Municipal district: Clearwater County, Alberta

Government
  - Type: Unincorporated
  - Governing body: Clearwater County, Alberta Council

Population (1991)
  - Total: 50
- Time zone: UTC−06:00 (Alberta Time)
- Area codes: 403, 587, 825

Withrow is a hamlet in central Alberta, Canada within Clearwater County. It is located on a Canadian National rail line and Withrow Road (Range Road 43), 8 km (5.0 mi) north of Highway 11 and 8 km (5.0 mi) south of Highway 12. It is approximately 15 km (9.3 mi) east of Rocky Mountain House.

== Demographics ==
Withrow recorded a population of 50 in the 1991 Census of Population conducted by Statistics Canada.

== See also ==
- List of communities in Alberta
- List of hamlets in Alberta
