= Caroline School =

Public school in Clearwater County, Alberta, Canada

- Clearwater County, Alberta, T0M 0M0; Canada

Information
- School type: Public
- Founded: 1908
- Status: Open
- Grades: K–12
- Enrollment: 390
- Language: English
- Campus: Rural
- Colour
- Athletics: Golf, cross country, football, volleyball, and basketball
- Website: caroline.wrsd.ca

Caroline School is a public school located in the unincorporated hamlet of Caroline in Clearwater County, Alberta, Canada. Caroline School offers comprehensive educational programmes for students in grades kindergarten through grade twelve. Several notable athletes have graduated from Caroline School.

== History ==
Formal education in the Caroline district began after the region was settled by European and Canadian homesteaders. On April 27, 1908, the Alberta Department of Education authorized the creation of the South Fork School District No. 1803. During the winter of 1908–1909, the area's first schoolhouse was built approximately one mile south of Caroline along the Raven River. The first teacher was a Texas native named W.H. Devore whose students included both local children and adult pupils seeking basic literacy and arithmetic.

That first log building served until 1941 when classes were moved to a new building in the hamlet of Caroline. In 1948, the district officially became the Caroline School District No. 1803. Over the next decade, one-room schoolhouses throughout the surrounding foothills were amalgamated into Caroline School District, giving students opportunities to attend free public high school for the first time. An extensive rural school bus system was established for the first time.

In 1956 the district constructed a dedicated modern, centralized school. Over the next fifty years, Caroline School grew steadily. Expansions and renovations through the 1960s, 1970s, and 1980s, along with a major addition in 1993, ensured the building could effectively serve. Eventually placed inside the Caroline School the Wild Rose School Division (WRSD), today the Caroline School continues to serve as an anchor in the community.

Recently, WRSD designated the aging facility for a comprehensive modernization and envelope overhaul to update its mechanical, heating, and instructional spaces for modern learning standards. There is also discussion of "right-sizing" the building in the regional plan as well.

== Alumni ==
- Pete Vandermeer, Professional ice hockey player, Class of 1993
- Jim Vandermeer, Professional ice hockey player and coach, Class of 1998
- Kris Russell, Professional ice hockey player, Class of 2005
- Ryan Russell, Professional ice hockey player, Class of 2005

Additionally, four-time World Champion figure skater Kurt Browning attended Caroline School through Grade 10 before relocating to Edmonton in 1982 to finish high school while training).
