= Cline River, Alberta =

Locality in Alberta, Canada

Coordinates: 52°11′19″N 116°28′44″W

Location of Cline River Alberta

Cline River is a locality in central Alberta, Canada within Clearwater County. It is located along Highway 11 (David Thompson Highway) approximately 134 km (83 mi) west of Rocky Mountain House.

== See also ==
- List of communities in Alberta
