= Condor, Alberta =

Condor
- Hamlet
- Location of Condor in Alberta
- Coordinates: 52.3264°N 114.5553°W
- Country: Canada
- Province: Alberta
- Census division: No. 9
- Municipal district: Clearwater County

Government
  - Type: Unincorporated
  - Reeve: John Vandermeer
  - Governing body: Clearwater County Council: Jim Duncan; Timothy Hoven; Theresa Laing; Cammie Laird; Daryl Lougheed; Michelle Swanson; John Vandermeer
- Elevation: 960 m (3,150 ft)

Population (1991)
  - Total: 99
- Time zone: UTC−06:00 (Alberta Time)

Condor is a hamlet in Alberta, Canada within Clearwater County.

The hamlet is located in census division No. 9 and in the federal riding of Wetaskiwin. In 1938, they were still negotiating for a gravel road to their community.

The hamlet was named in tribute to the British Royal Navy ship HMS Condor.

== Demographics ==
Population history of Condor
Year	Pop.	±%
1941	79	—
1951	72	−8.9%
1956	72	+0.0%
1961	99	+37.5%
1966	57	−42.4%
1971	62	+8.8%
1976	52	−16.1%
1981	74	+42.3%
1986	95	+28.4%
1991	99	+4.2%
Source: Statistics Canada

Condor recorded a population of 99 in the 1991 Census of Population conducted by Statistics Canada.

== Notable people ==
- Barry Mather, Canadian journalist and Member of Parliament (1968-1972)

== See also ==
- List of communities in Alberta
- List of hamlets in Alberta
