= Burnstick Lake =

- Summer village
- Summer Village of Burnstick Lake
- Location in Clearwater County

- Location of Burnstick Lake in Alberta
- Coordinates: 51.99061°N 114.89034°W
- Country: Canada
- Province: Alberta
- Census division: No. 9
- Municipal district: Clearwater County

Government
  - Type: Municipal incorporation
  - Mayor: Harold Esche
  - Deputy Mayor: Doug Lindblom
  - Councillor: Brenda Madge
  - Governing body: Burnstick Lake Summer Village Council

Area (2021)
  - Land: 0.18 km^{2} (0.069 sq mi)

Population (2021)
  - Total: 21
  - Density: 116.4/km^{2} (301/sq mi)
- Time zone: UTC−06:00 (Alberta Time)
- Website: Official website

Burnstick Lake is a summer village in Alberta, Canada. It is located on the northern shore of Burnstick Lake, in Clearwater County, south of Caroline.

== Demographics ==
In the 2021 Census of Population conducted by Statistics Canada, the Summer Village of Burnstick Lake had a population of 21 living in 10 of its 54 total private dwellings, a change of 40% from its 2016 population of 15. With a land area of 0.18 km^{2} (0.069 sq mi), it had a population density of 116.7/km^{2} (302.2/sq mi) in 2021.

In the 2016 Census of Population conducted by Statistics Canada, the Summer Village of Burnstick Lake originally had a population of 0 living in 0 of its 0 total private dwellings, a −100% change from its 2011 population of 16. Statistics Canada subsequently amended the 2016 census results for Burnstick Lake to a population of 15 living in 7 of its 57 total dwellings, a −6.3% change from its 2011 population of 16. With a land area of 0.18 km^{2} (0.069 sq mi), it had a population density of 83.3/km^{2} (215.8/sq mi) in 2016.

== See also ==
- List of communities in Alberta
- List of summer villages in Alberta
- List of resort villages in Saskatchewan
