= Red Deer Canadian Pacific Railway Bridge =

CPR Bridge
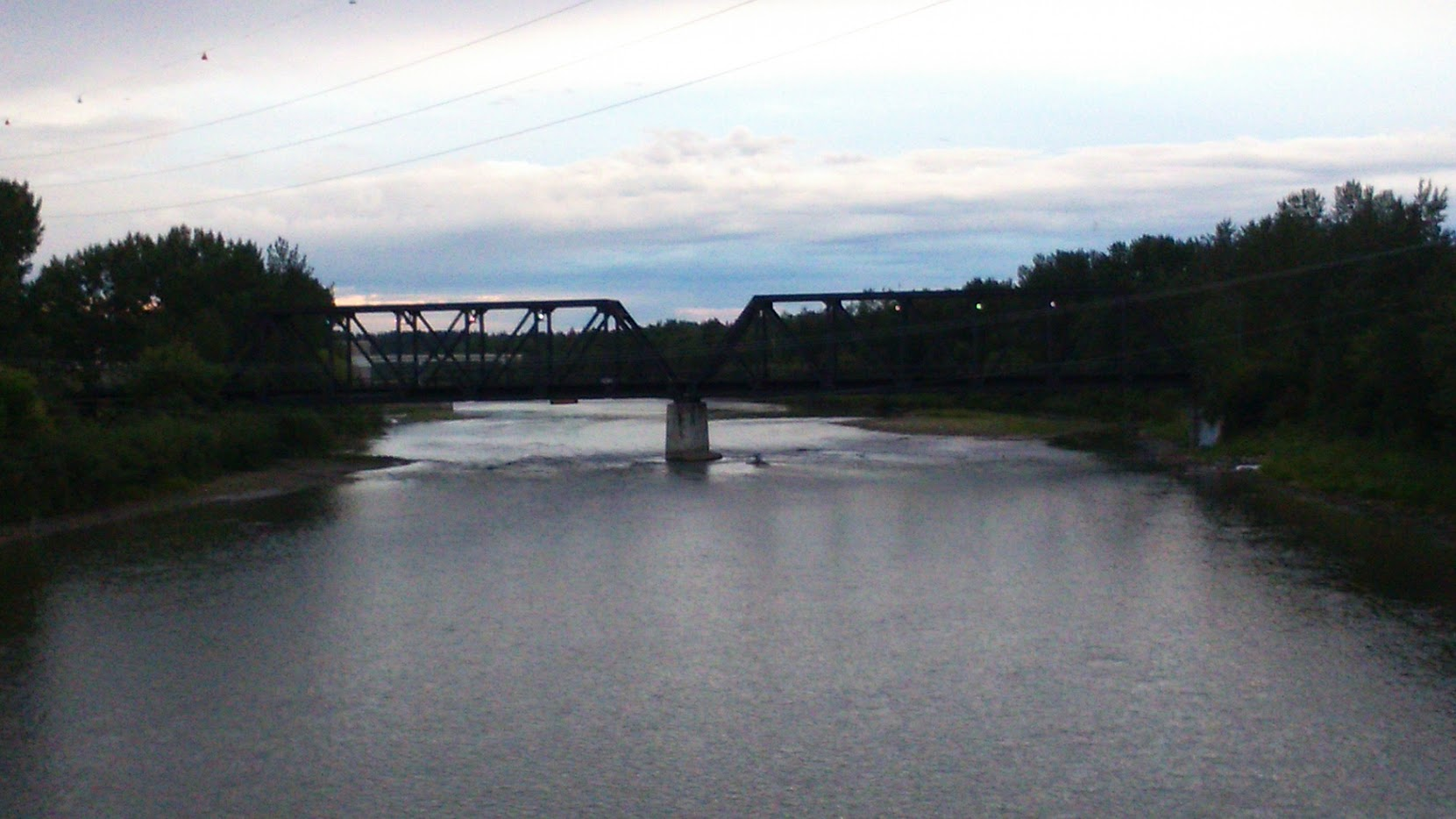
- The CPR Bridge. Picture taken from downstream on another bridge across from the CPR bridge.
- Coordinates: 52.2757°N 113.8170°W
- Carries: Trans Canada Trail
- Crosses: Red Deer River, Trans Canada Trail, decommissioned street
- Locale: Red Deer
- Official name: Canadian Pacific Railway Bridge
- Named for: Canadian Pacific Railway
- Maintained by: City of Red Deer
- Preceded by: Used to carry Traffic and Railway.

Characteristics
- Design: riveted steel, engineered truss, railway bridge
- Material: Timber, steel, concrete, earth

History
- Construction start: 1890
- Construction end: 1891
- Opened: 1890 or 1891
- Closed: 1991
- Replaces: Reopened 1992, replaces Canadian Pacific Railway.

Statistics
- Daily traffic: Pedestrians & Cyclists

Location
- Interactive map of CPR Bridge

The Red Deer Canadian Pacific Railway Bridge is a former Canadian Pacific Railway bridge turned pedestrian bridge in the City of Red Deer, located in Central Alberta, Canada. The bridge carries cyclists and pedestrians on the Trans Canada Trail over the Red Deer River, another part of the Trans Canada Trail, and a decommissioned street.

== History ==
The bridge was originally constructed during the winter of 1890-91 as a sturdy 3-span timber truss railway bridge near the Leonard Gaetz homestead by the Canadian Pacific Railway for the Calgary and Edmonton Railway. It served as a traffic and rail bridge. The original spans over the river were eventually replaced by the current two 150 ft. span steel truss through system in 1907 at the cost of an estimated C$57,000. Earth and concrete replaced some other parts of the original trestle. In July 1908, bridge labourer James J. Shea died of complications after falling into the river below.

In 1991, the bridge, and a nearby train station, were abandoned after the rail yards were relocated to the west side of the city and a new bridge was constructed. On September 3, 1991, Red Deer City Council passed a by-law designating the rail bridge as a Municipal Historic Resource and in 1993, the bridge was designated a Provincial Historic site. On Sept. 13, 1992, the bridge was officially reopened at the cost of C$171,500.

== See also ==
- List of crossings of the Red Deer River
- List of bridges in Canada
