= Napoleon Trails Gravesite =

Natural area in Alberta, Canada

Napoleon trail system
- Location: Innisfail, Alberta, Canada
- Hiking trails: yes

Napoleon trail system is a natural area in Innisfail, Alberta, Canada. Motorized vehicles are not allowed on the trails, and night time exploring of the trails is not advised.
