= Alhambra, Alberta =

Alhambra
- Hamlet
- Location of Alhambra in Alberta
- Coordinates: 52.3431°N 114.6725°W
- Country: Canada
- Province: Alberta
- Census division: No. 9
- Municipal district: Clearwater County

Government
  - Type: Unincorporated
  - Reeve: John Vandermeer
  - Governing body: Clearwater County Council: Jim Duncan; Timothy Hoven; Theresa Laing; Cammie Laird; Daryl Lougheed; Michelle Swanson; John Vandermeer
- Elevation: 980 m (3,220 ft)

Population (1991)
  - Total: 64
- Time zone: UTC−06:00 (Alberta Time)

Alhambra is a hamlet in Alberta, Canada within Clearwater County. It is located close to the David Thompson Highway, east of Rocky Mountain House.

The hamlet is located in census division No. 9. It was first settled in 1905 and the local post office had the name Horseguards. (Horseguards Creek is nearby.)

It was re-named Alhambra when the railroad arrived in 1914. The community takes its name from Alhambra, in Grenada, Spain, as an attempt to share some of that place's glory.

== Demographics ==
Alhambra recorded a population of 64 in the 1991 Census of Population conducted by Statistics Canada.

== See also ==
- List of communities in Alberta
- List of hamlets in Alberta
