= Gleniffer Lake =

Reservoir in Alberta, Canada

- Location within Alberta
- Location: Red Deer County, Alberta
- Coordinates: 52°01′35″N 114°16′13″W
- Type: reservoir
- Primary inflows: Red Deer River
- Primary outflows: Red Deer River
- Catchment area: 5,610 km^{2} (2,170 sq mi)
- Basin countries: Canada
- Max. length: 7 km (4.3 mi)
- Max. width: 2 km (1.2 mi)
- Surface area: 17.6 km^{2} (6.8 sq mi)
- Average depth: 11.6 m (38 ft)
- Max. depth: 33 m (108 ft)
- Surface elevation: 945 m (3,100 ft)

Gleniffer Lake, also known as Gleniffer Reservoir or originally Lake Gleniffer is an artificial lake in central Alberta, Canada, created in 1983 by the construction of the Dickson Dam which impounded the Red Deer River, a major tributary of the South Saskatchewan River which flows into the Saskatchewan River Basin.

It lies at an elevation of 945 metres (3,100 ft), and is approximately 7 kilometres (4.3 mi) long and 2 kilometres (1.2 mi) wide. The lake is south of Highway 54 and east of the Cowboy Trail, 36 kilometres (22 mi) west of Innisfail, Alberta and 36 kilometres (22 mi) east of Caroline.

The lake has a surface of 17.6 square kilometres (6.8 sq mi), and a watershed of 5,610 square kilometres (2,170 sq mi). It has an average depth of 11.6 metres (38 ft), and reaches a maximum of 33 metres (108 ft).

Gleniffer Lake has day-use areas, cottages, a campground and resort developments including Carefree Resort and Gleniffer Lake Resort.

The lake reservoir is a source of drinking water for the surrounding area.

== Dickson Dam ==
Dickson Dam regulates the flow of the Red Deer River to control for floods and low winter flows, to improve quality of the river, to create a recreational resource and to provide a reliable, year-round water supply sufficient for future industrial, regional and municipal growth.

== Gleniffer Reservoir Provincial Recreation Area ==
Gleniffer Reservoir Provincial Recreation Area (PRA) has a beach, various fishing areas, boating, camping and resorts. In the summer of 2009, Alberta Tourism, Parks and Recreation consolidated six provincial recreation areas at Dickson Dam and around Gleniffer Lake (Dickson Dam–Cottonwood PRA, Dickson Dam–Dickson Point PRA, Dickson Dam–North Dyke PRA, Dickson Dam–South Dyke PRA, Dickson Dam–North Valley PRA, Dickson Dam–South Valley PRA) into one provincial recreation area renamed Gleniffer Reservoir PRA. Motorboating, waterskiing, swimming, and sailboarding are allowed. There are rainbow trout in a trout pond. Northern pike, walleye, Rockies, and brown trout are also found nearby. Gleniffer Reservoir PRA has trout ponds including one at Dickson Point, which is popular for ice fishing.

== Environmental concerns ==
=== Pipeline leaks ===
Increased water flow of the Red Deer River system during heavy rainfall in June 2008 eroded supporting soil, freely exposing a section of Pembina Pipeline Corporation's Cremona crude oil pipeline to the Red Deer River currents. About 75 to 125 barrels (11.9 to 19.9 m^{3}) of crude oil flowed upstream from the breakpoint under a Red Deer River channel, leaving an oily sheen on Gleniffer Reservoir and 6,800 kilograms (15,000 lb) of oil-soaked debris. The remediation was completed in 2011.

=== Rangeland pipeline incident ===
Heavy rains in early June 2012 caused a similar but larger leak on a Plains Midstream Canada 46-year-old pipeline at Jackson Creek which spilled between 1,000 and 3,000 barrels (160 and 480 m^{3}) of light sour crude into the Red Deer River.
