= Phoenix, Alberta =

Former coal mining community

Coordinates: 52°23′N 115°25′W

Approximate location of Phoenix, Alberta

Phoenix is a former coal mining community between Nordegg and Rocky Mountain House in west-central Alberta, Canada.

A sawmill operated along the North Saskatchewan River near Phoenix in the 1920s to produce railway ties for the Burrows Lumber Company.
