= Division No. 9, Alberta =

Census division in Canada

Coordinates: 52°22′12″N 114°55′12″W

Division No. 9
- Census division in Alberta
- Country: Canada
- Province: Alberta

Area
  - Total: 18,922 km^{2} (7,306 sq mi)

Population (2021)
  - Total: 20,569
  - Density: 1.0870/km^{2} (2.8154/sq mi)

Division No. 9 is a census division in Alberta, Canada. It is located in the southwest corner of central Alberta and its largest urban community is the Town of Rocky Mountain House. The boundaries of the division are coextensive with the outer boundaries of Clearwater County.

== Census subdivisions ==
The following census subdivisions (municipalities or municipal equivalents) are located within Alberta's Division No. 9.

- Towns
  - Rocky Mountain House
- Hamlets
  - Alhambra
  - Caroline
  - Condor
  - Leslieville
  - Nordegg
  - Withrow
- Summer villages
  - Burnstick Lake
- Municipal districts
  - Clearwater County
- Indian reserves
  - Big Horn 144A
  - O'Chiese 203
  - Sunchild 202

== Demographics ==
Historical population
Year	Pop.	±%
1991	16,734	—
1996	18,196	+8.7%
2001	19,573	+7.6%
2006	20,351	+4.0%
2011	21,290	+4.6%
2016	20,869	−2.0%
2021	20,569	−1.4%

In the 2021 Census of Population conducted by Statistics Canada, Division No. 9 had a population of 20,569 living in 8,138 of its 9,414 total private dwellings, a change of −1.4% from its 2016 population of 20,869. With a land area of 18,834.93 km^{2} (7,272.21 sq mi), it had a population density of 1.1/km^{2} (2.8/sq mi) in 2021.

== See also ==
- List of census divisions of Alberta
- List of communities in Alberta
