= Finnegan, Alberta =

Unincorporated community in southern Alberta, Canada

Coordinates: 51°07′40″N 112°04′54″W

Location of Finnegan Alberta

Finnegan is an unincorporated community in southern Alberta in Special Area No. 2, located 14 kilometres (8.7 mi) west of Highway 36, 64 kilometres (40 mi) northwest of Brooks.

== Finnegan Ferry ==
The Finnegan Ferry is a historic cable ferry in Alberta, Canada that is still in operation. It is located at the unincorporated community of Finnegan. The ferry is the north–south connection of Alberta Highway 862 where it crosses the Red Deer River.

It is named for John Finnegan (1842–1924) who homesteaded on the river, then opened and operated the ferry. The community is named after the ferry. According to a tourism guidebook, Finnegan "was a very active wirey man all his life and at the age of 75 could still do handsprings!"

The toll-free ferry is operated by Alberta Transportation. It has a capacity of thirteen cars, or fifty passengers. The ferry operates between 7:00 am and midnight from April 20 until November 15.

Finnegan Ferry has a weight limit of 62.5 tonnes (61.5 long tons; 68.9 short tons) and dimensions of the ferry are 22.5 metres (74 ft) long and 10.36 metres (34.0 ft) wide.

=== In popular culture ===
In 1991, musician Tom Cochrane shot part of the music video to his song "Life Is a Highway" on the ferry.
