= Star Mine Suspension Bridge =

Suspension bridge across the Red Deer River in Drumheller, Alberta, Canada

Coordinates: 51.42030°N 112.61575°W

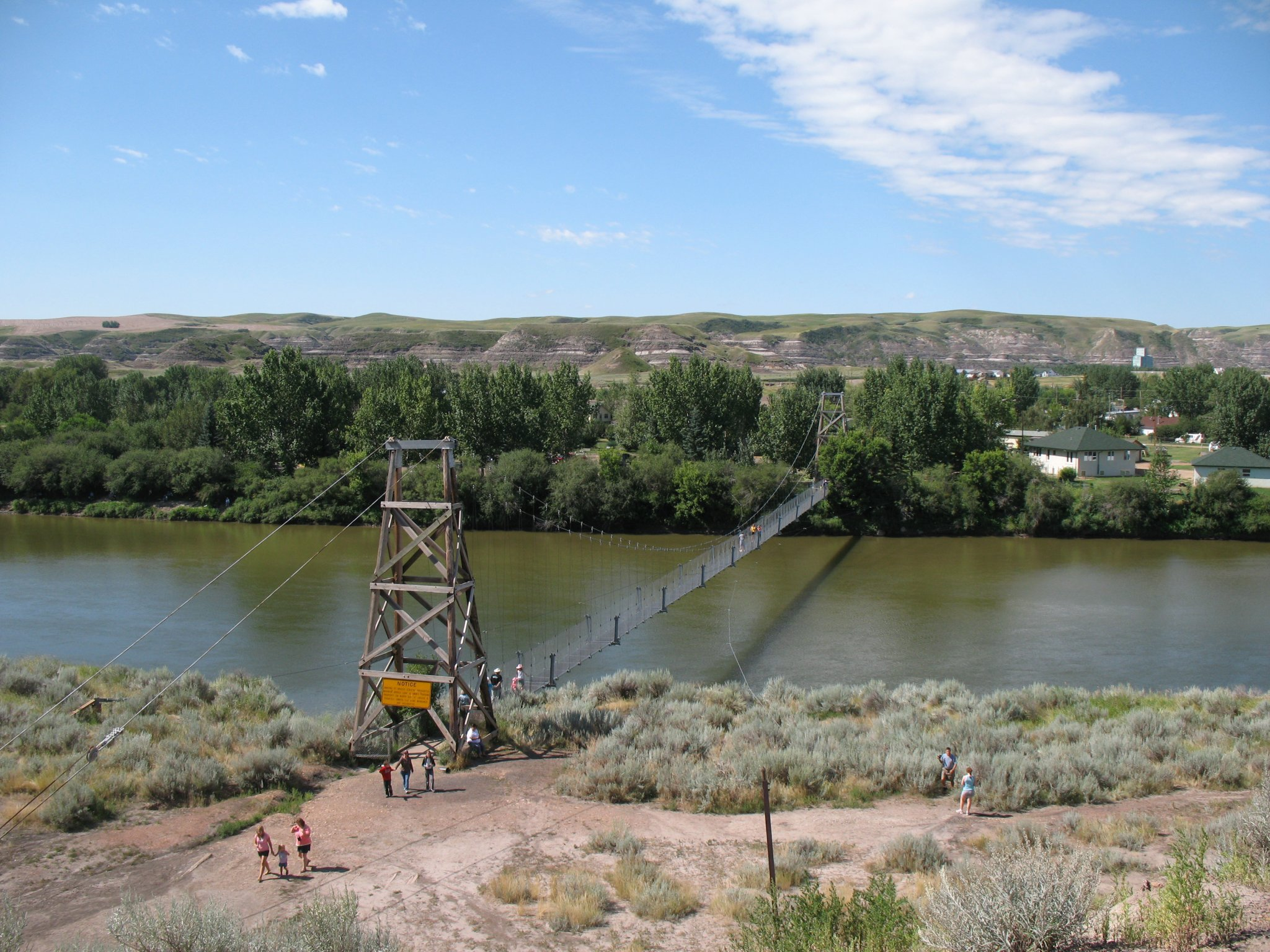
Star Mine Suspension Bridge

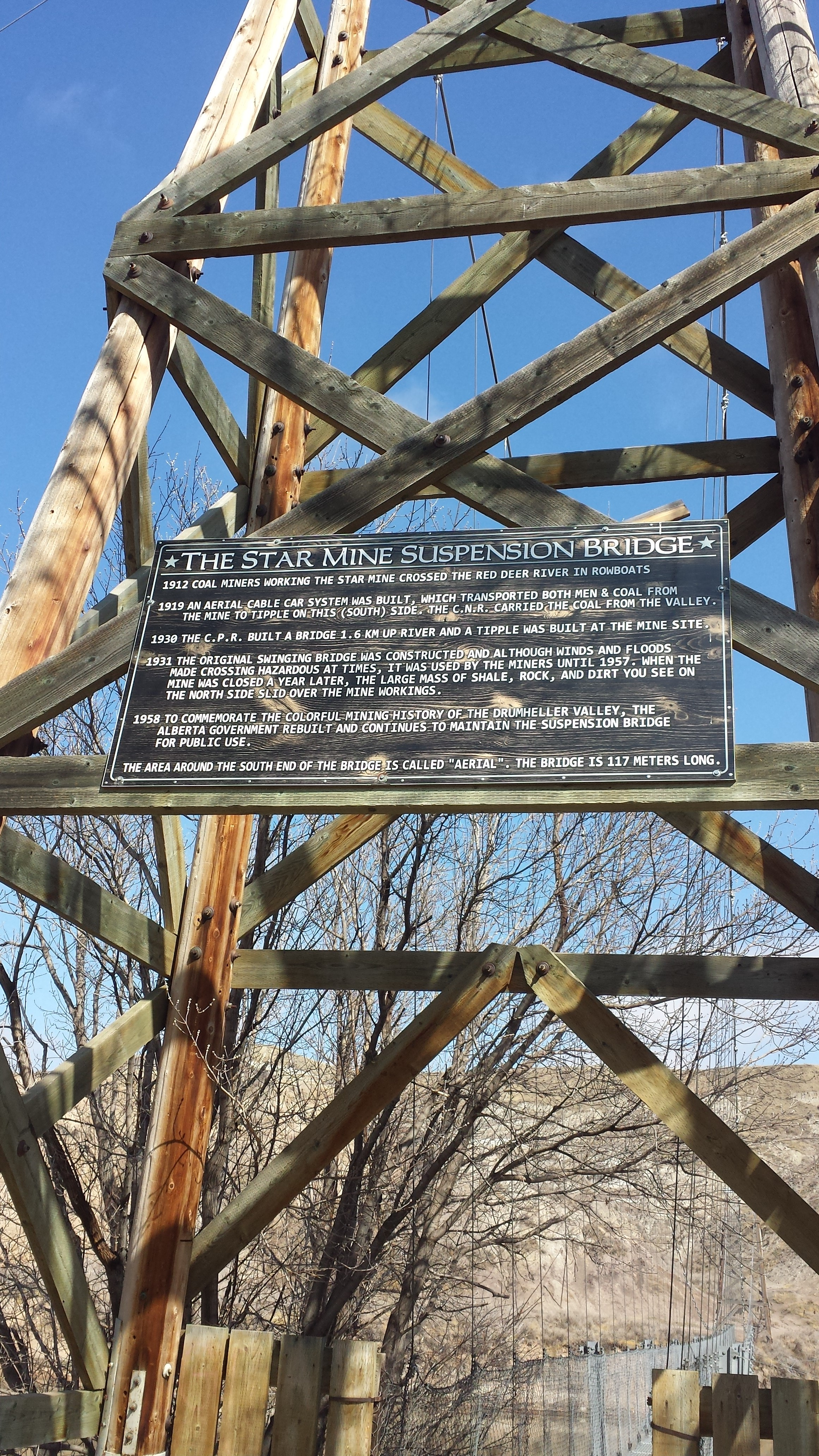

The Star Mine Suspension Bridge is a 117-metre-long pedestrian suspension bridge across the Red Deer River in Drumheller, Alberta, Canada. Constructed in 1931, it was built for the coal workers of Star Mine. In 1958, the Alberta government rebuilt (and currently maintains) the bridge to "commemorate part of the colourful mining history of the Drumheller Valley."

After almost four years of being closed due to the support at the north-east end being in very poor condition, the bridge re-opened to the public in January 2024.

== See also ==
- List of bridges in Canada
