= Beaver Creek (Alberta) =

Stream in Alberta, Canada

Coordinates: 49.6294444°N 113.7°W

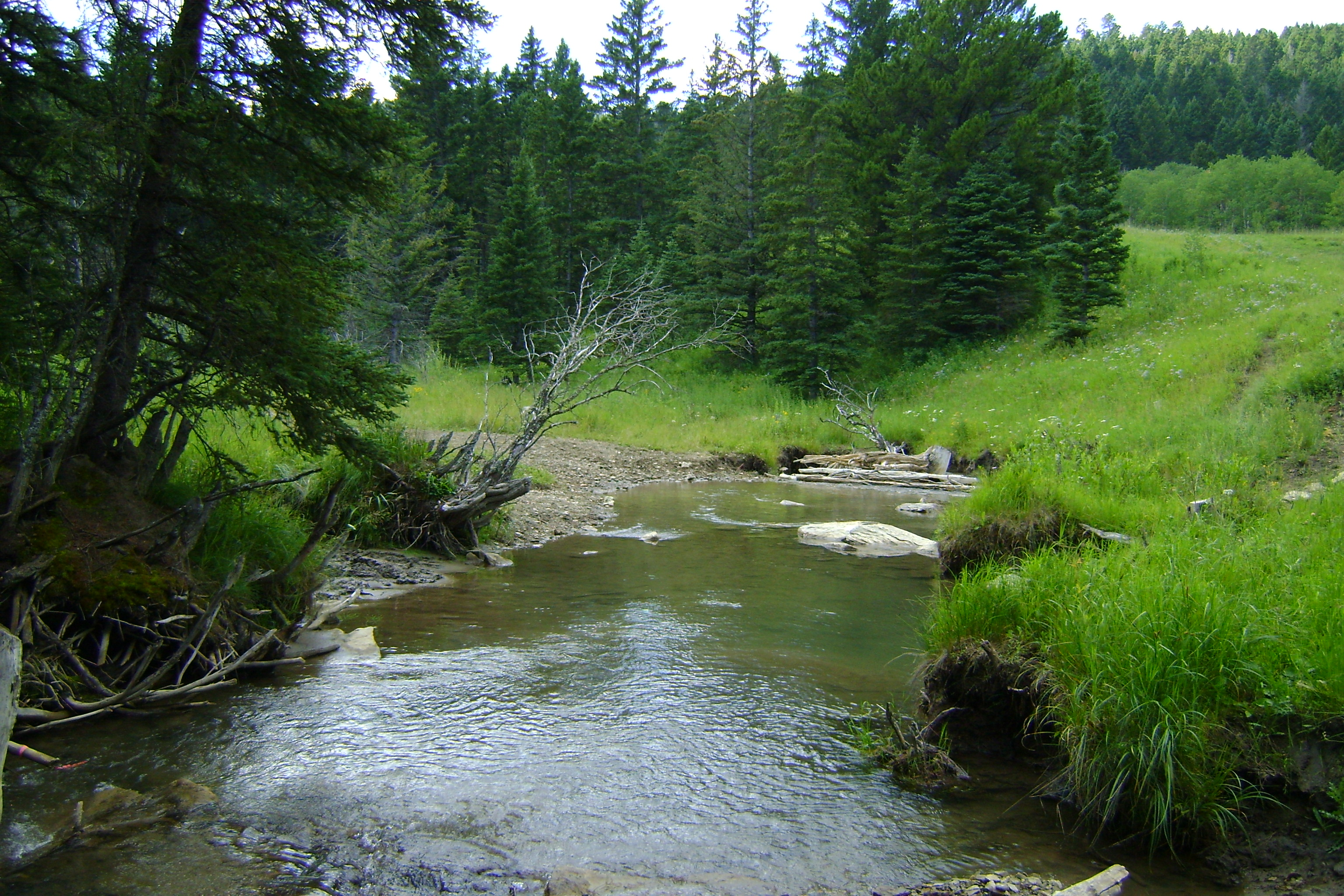
Beaver Creek in August 2010

Beaver Creek is a stream in Alberta, Canada. It is a tributary of the Oldman River.

Beaver Creek's name comes from the Blackfoot Indians of the area, who saw beavers near its course.

== See also ==
- List of rivers of Alberta
