= Clearwater County, Alberta =

Municipal district in Alberta, Canada

Clearwater County
- Municipal district
- Seal

- Location within Alberta
- Coordinates: 52°22′31″N 114°55′18″W
- Country: Canada
- Province: Alberta
- Region: Central Alberta
- Census division: 9
- Incorporated (municipal district): January 1, 1985
- Name change: July 1, 2000
- Amalgamated: January 1, 2025

Government
  - Governing body: Clearwater County Council: Jim Duncan; Timothy Hoven; Theresa Laing; Cammie Laird; Daryl Lougheed; Michelle Swanson; John Vandermeer
  - CAO: Rick Emmons
  - Administrative office: Rocky Mountain House
  - Reeve: Michelle Swanson

Area (2021)
  - Land: 18,605.71 km^{2} (7,183.70 sq mi)

Population (2021)
  - Total: 11,865
  - Density: 0.6/km^{2} (1.6/sq mi)
- Time zone: UTC−06:00 (Alberta Time)
- Website: Official website

Clearwater County is a municipal district in west central Alberta, Canada in Division No. 9. Its northwest boundary is the Brazeau River. The municipal office is located in the Town of Rocky Mountain House. The county has a land area of 18,691.65 km^{2} (7,216.89 sq mi) and comprises close to 99% of Census Division No. 9's land area of 18,921.38 km^{2} (7,305.59 sq mi). Although the territory excluded is rather small in geographical area, it comprises the major population centre of Rocky Mountain House, which has one-third of Division No. 9's population, in addition to the communities of Burnstick Lake and three Indian reserves. Clearwater County's 2021 census population was 11,865, which was prior to amalgamation with Caroline in 2025.

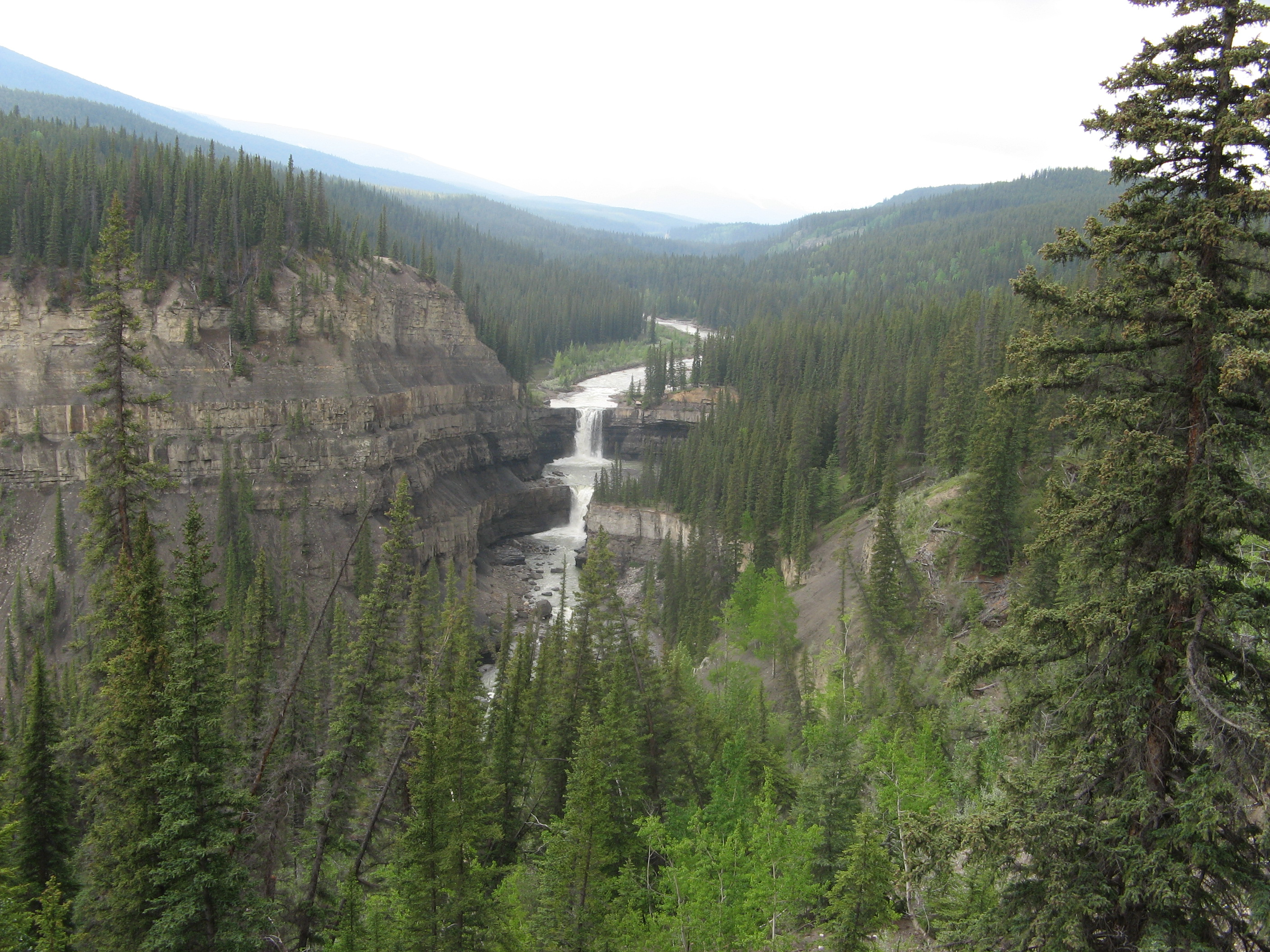
Bighorn River Valley and Crescent Falls

== History ==
The Municipal District of Clearwater No. 9 was incorporated as a municipal district from Improvement District No. 10 on January 1, 1985. Its name was changed to Clearwater County on July 1, 2000. Clearwater County amalgamated with the Village of Caroline to form a new municipality on January 1, 2025, retaining the name "Clearwater County". Caroline became a hamlet in the new municipality.

== Geography ==
=== Communities and localities ===
The following urban municipalities are surrounded by Clearwater County.

Cities

- none

Towns

- Rocky Mountain House

Villages

- none

Summer villages

- Burnstick Lake

The following hamlets are located within Clearwater County.

Hamlets

- Alhambra
- Caroline
- Condor
- Leslieville
- Nordegg
- Withrow

The following localities are located within Clearwater County.

Localities

- Alexo
- Ancona
- Baptiste River
- Bingley
- Brazeau
- Brower Subdivision
- Butte
- Carlos
- Chedderville
- Clearwater Subdivision
- Cline River
- Cline Settlement
- Codner
- Congresbury

- Crammond
- Crimson Lake
- Dovercourt
- Evergreen
- Ferrier (designated place)
- Ferrier Acres Trailer Court
- Garth
- Goldeye
- Gray Subdivision
- Harlech
- Horburg
- Improvement District No. 10
- James River Bridge
- Lochearn

- Martins Trailer Court (designated place)
- Morrish Subdivision
- Oras
- Pinewoods Estates
- Ricinus
- Saunders
- Stauffer
- Stolberg
- Strachan
- Ullin
- Vetchland
- Westerner Trailer Court
- Woodland Estates
- Ya Ha Tinda Ranch

Other places

Phoenix, a former coal mining community between Nordegg and Rocky Mountain House, is also located within Clearwater County.

== Demographics ==
In the 2021 Census of Population conducted by Statistics Canada, Clearwater County had a population of 11,865 living in 4,817 of its 5,605 total private dwellings, a change of −0.7% from its 2016 population of 11,947. With a land area of 18,605.71 km^{2} (7,183.70 sq mi), it had a population density of 0.6/km^{2} (1.7/sq mi) in 2021.

In the 2016 Census of Population conducted by Statistics Canada, Clearwater County had a population of 11,947 living in 4,699 of its 5,486 total private dwellings, a −2.7% change from its 2011 population of 12,278. With a land area of 18,682.45 km^{2} (7,213.33 sq mi), it had a population density of 0.6/km^{2} (1.7/sq mi) in 2016.

== Economy ==
The economy of the county is based on agriculture, oil and gas and forestry, with tourism increasing in importance in recent years.

== Attractions ==
- Rocky Mountain House Historic Site in Rocky Mountain House
- Historic minesite in Nordegg
- Hiking in the Bighorn Wildland
- Camping at Burnstick Lake campsite
- Canoeing on lakes; Rafting and kayaking on Clearwater River and North Saskatchewan River
- Cross-country skiing, snowmobile trail in the Chambers Creek area
- Fishing (cutthroat, rainbow, brook and lake trout, whitefish) and hunting
- Caroline Hub, a community facility in Caroline including an arena and various facilities

== See also ==
- List of communities in Alberta
- List of municipal districts in Alberta
- Division No. 9, Alberta
- Caroline School
