= Dickson Dam =

Dam in Red Deer County, Alberta, Canada

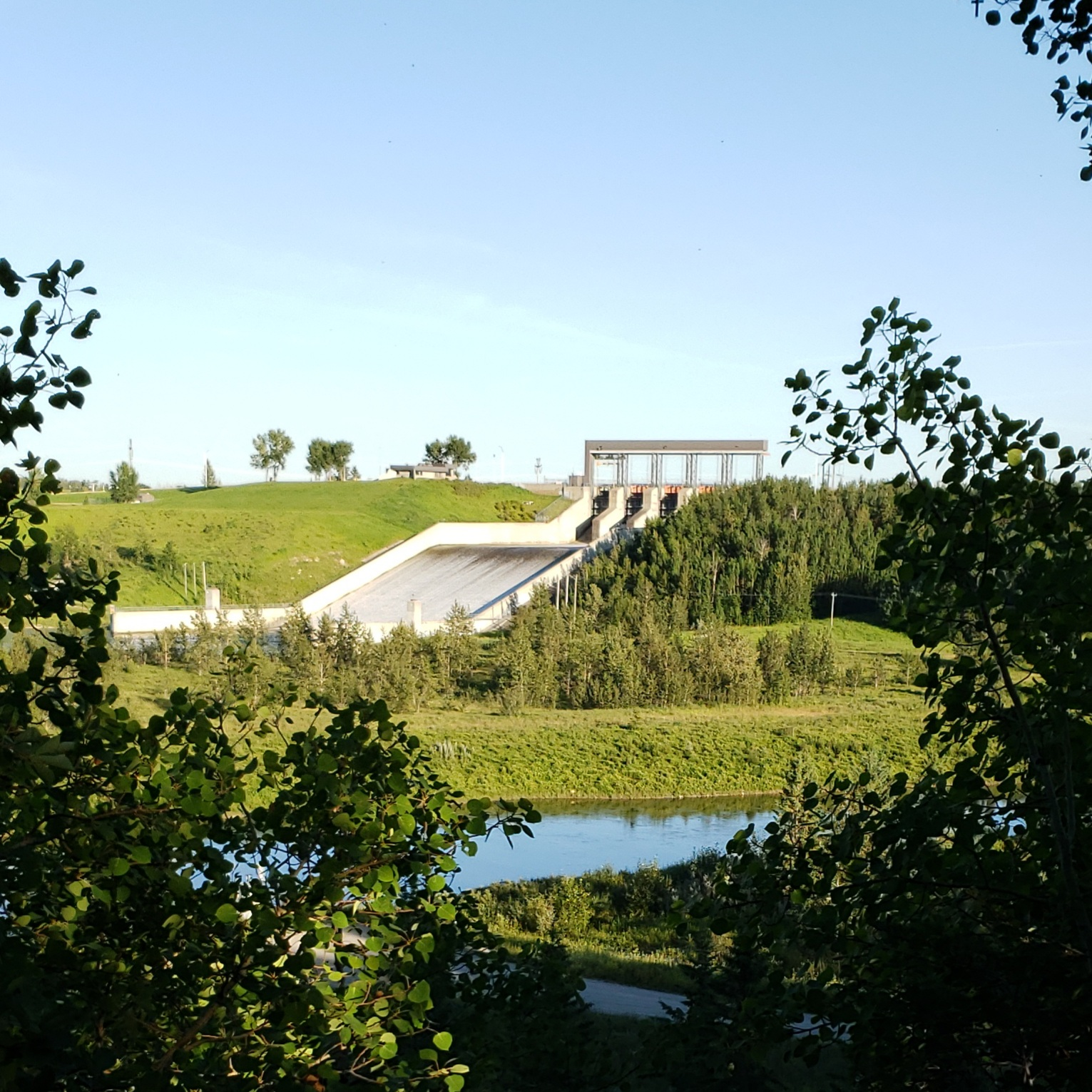

- Location within Alberta
- Country: Canada
- Location: Red Deer County, Alberta
- Coordinates: 52°03′06″N 114°13′07″W

Power Station
- Commission date: January 16, 1992
- Turbines: 3 × 5 MW Barber turbines
- Installed capacity: 15 MW

Dickson Dam is a flow-regulation dam constructed in 1983 which impounded the Red Deer River creating a reservoir known as Gleniffer Lake. The dam is 20 kilometres (12 mi) west of the town of Innisfail and 50 kilometres (31 mi) southwest of the city of Red Deer. The dam was created to control for floods and low winter flows, to improve quality of the river, to create a recreational resource and to provide a reliable, year-round water supply sufficient for future industrial, regional and municipal growth.

== Generation ==
All water control structures at the site, including the dam, intake, headgates, and spillway, are owned by the Province of Alberta and administered by Alberta Environment and Water. Algonquin Power owns a small hydropower station that was added to the dam. It consists of three 5 MW Barber turbines with Ideal Generators. Commercial operations began on January 16, 1992. Water management of the reservoir is directed by the provincial Ministry of Environment and Water.

Under the Dickson Power Purchase Agreement signed in 1990, all electrical power generated by the facility was sold to TransAlta Utilities Corporation. The 20-year contract expired on January 16, 2012.

Low reservoir water levels were a concern in 2010.

== Gleniffer Reservoir Provincial Recreation Area ==
In the summer of 2009, Alberta Tourism, Parks and Recreation consolidated six provincial recreation areas (PRAs) at Dickson Dam and around Gleniffer Lake (Dickson Dam–Cottonwood PRA, Dickson Dam–Dickson Point PRA, Dickson Dam–North Dyke PRA, Dickson Dam–South Dyke PRA, Dickson Dam–North Valley PRA, Dickson Dam–South Valley PRA) into one PRA renamed Gleniffer Reservoir PRA. Motorboating, waterskiing, swimming, and sailboarding are allowed. There are rainbow trout in a trout pond. Northern pike, walleye, mountain whitefish, and brown trout are also found nearby.
