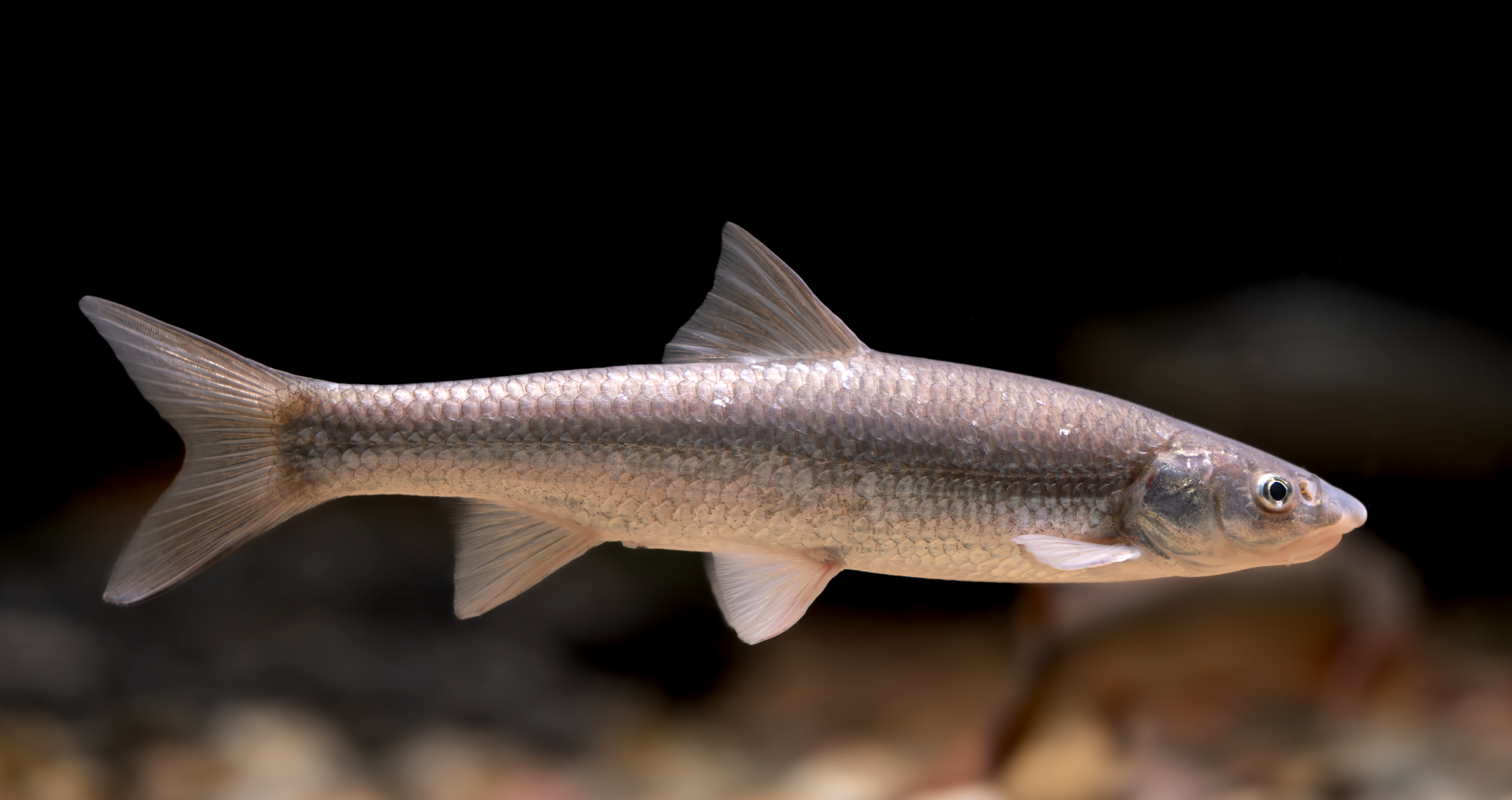

Conservation status
- Least Concern (IUCN 3.1)

Scientific classification
- Kingdom: Animalia
- Phylum: Chordata
- Class: Actinopterygii
- Order: Cypriniformes
- Family: Leuciscidae
- Subfamily: Pogonichthyinae
- Genus: Platygobio; T. N. Gill, 1863
- Species: P. gracilis

Binomial name
- Platygobio gracilis (J. Richardson, 1836)

Synonyms
- Cyprinus (Leuciscus) gracilis J. Richardson, 1836; Coregonus angusticeps Valenciennes, 1848; Pogonichthys communis Girard, 1856; Pogonichthys (Platygobio) gulonellus Cope, 1865; Ceratichthys physignathus Cope, 1875; Platygobio pallidus Forbes, 1883

= Flathead chub =

Species of fish in the carp family

The flathead chub (Platygobio gracilis) is a species of freshwater ray-finned fish belonging to the family Leuciscidae, the shiners, daces and minnows. It is the only member of the monotypic genus Platygobio. It is native to North America, where it is distributed throughout central Canada and the central United States.

== Distribution ==
This fish was first described from the Saskatchewan River in 1836. It is also known from three other major river systems in central North America, the Mackenzie, Missouri-Mississippi, and Rio Grande drainages. Its distribution extends from the Northwest Territories to Texas.

== Biology ==
This is a minnow with an elongated body and a flat, "wedge-shaped" head. It has a pointed snout with a large mouth and barbels. It has sickle-shaped pectoral fins and a forked tail fin with pointed lobes. It has taste buds in its anal and pelvic fins. It has a slightly curving lateral line and large scales. The body of the adult may be brownish, olive, or black in color with a silvery wash across the sides and belly. The adult is generally 9 to 18 centimetres (3.5 to 7.1 in) in length but can reach 26 centimetres (10 in). The male and female are similar in appearance.

This fish lives in rivers and large tributaries, often in fast-moving, turbid waters. The species may congregate in groups but moves independently rather than schooling. Spawning behaviors are not well known in this species. Feeding behaviors have not been observed often but the fish is thought to be mostly insectivorous.
