= Caroline, Alberta =

Caroline
- Hamlet
- Hamlet of Caroline
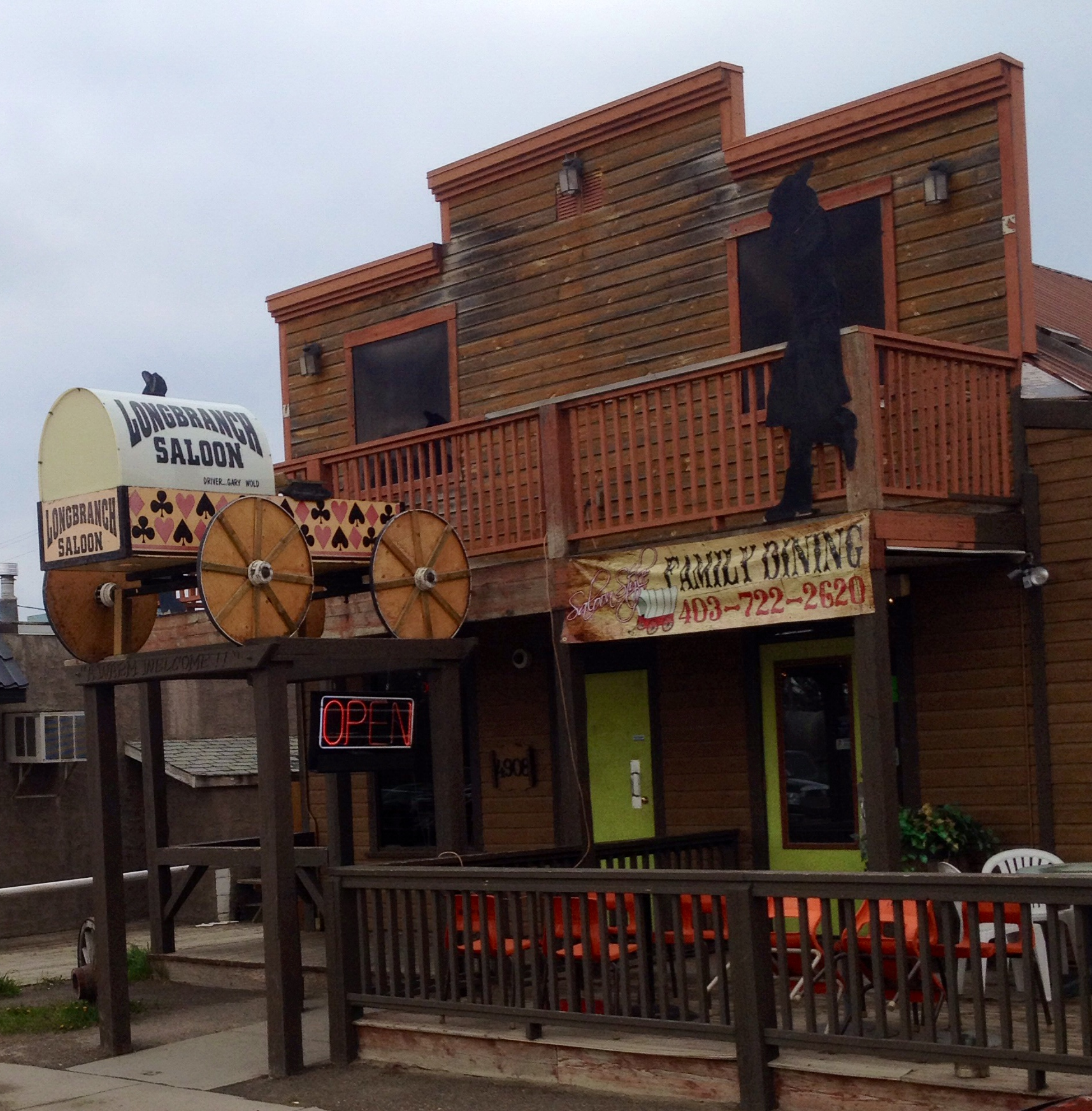
- Longbranch Saloon
- Motto: Prospering at Nature's Doorstep
- Location in Alberta
- Coordinates: 52°05′36.2″N 114°44′22.5″W
- Country: Canada
- Province: Alberta
- Region: Central Alberta
- Census division: 9
- Municipal district: Clearwater County
- Incorporated (village): December 31, 1951
- Amalgamated (hamlet): January 1, 2025

Government
  - Governing body: Clearwater County Council

Area (2021)
  - Land: 2.04 km^{2} (0.79 sq mi)
- Elevation: 1,065 m (3,494 ft)

Population (2021)
  - Total: 470
  - Density: 229.9/km^{2} (595/sq mi)
- Time zone: UTC−06:00 (Alberta Time)
- Postal code span: T0M-0M0
- Highways: Highway 22; Highway 54
- Website: Official website

Caroline /ˈkærəlaɪn/ is a hamlet in central Alberta, Canada that is under the jurisdiction of Clearwater County. It held village status prior to 2025. Caroline is southwest of Red Deer.

== Summary ==
With 514 residents as of 2024, the hamlet of Caroline is in the County of Clearwater. An agricultural and commercial center for the surrounding region, Caroline serves tourists on Highway 54 going to the neighbouring Rocky Mountains. The hamlet's commercial sector serves the southeast portion of Clearwater County with services including a motel, gas station, restaurants, a saloon, food stores, souvenir stores, and a large supply store for camping and hunting.

Caroline is home to a regional fire service and hall, a K-12 school, a two-day per week medical clinic, ambulance service, before- and after-school care, playschool, independent living retirement units, and a senior centre. Recent renovations have been made to the Kurt Browning Arena & Community Hall.

== History ==
Homesteaders first began clearing the land and establishing homesteads around the Caroline area in 1904. Drawn to the area between Calgary and Edmonton following promotional campaigns by the Canadian Pacific Railway and the Canadian government, these settlers quickly established farms and ranches throughout the region. The community is named after Caroline Langley, daughter of Mr. and Mrs. Harvey Langley. The family opened the community's original post office in 1908.

The settlement received its first telephone in 1909 through an improvised barbed-wire fence-line system strung between wooden fence posts before dedicated utility poles were installed several years later. Caroline incorporated as a village on December 31, 1951. Municipal electric power and running water services were installed in Caroline in 1954.

Along with farming and ranching, through the 1970s logging and local sawmills served as the primary economic backbone of the settlement's economy. Nearby settlers cleared heavily wooded tracts of poplar, pine, and spruce with oxen and saws to sell lumber across Central Alberta. That all changed in the 1980s when the region around Caroline experienced a significant economic transition following the discovery of the Caroline Swan Hills sour gas field. It is one of the largest onshore hydrocarbon discoveries in Alberta's history, and led to the construction of large-scale gas-processing infrastructure.

In the late 1980s and early 1990s, Caroline became internationally recognized as the childhood hometown of figure skater Kurt Browning, a four-time World Champion and four-time Canadian national champion. In 1989, the arena in the village's community complex was renamed for him in honour of his career.

On January 1, 2025, the Village of Caroline amalgamated with Clearwater County and became a hamlet in the country.

=== Historic schools ===
Early schools in the Caroline area were pioneer structures with rudimentary facilities, often made from rough-hewn logs and staffed with teachers barely out of eighth grade themselves. The highlights of the buildings included "green wood" chalkboards, wood stoves, chemical toilets, an occasional coat hall, and after the earliest years, well water. Before that water was drawn by students from nearby waterways like the Raven River. In many schools, students did janitor work, teachers taught classes of 12 to 40 students with each grade included, and school fairs and Christmas programs were popular events. Dances "and other forms of entertainment" were held in the buildings, too.

According to local historians, there have been many schools in the present-day Caroline School District. Between 1958 and 1961, many of these districts were consolidated with Caroline, while others were consolidated with the Rocky Mountain School Division. Before consolidation, it was rare for students in these schools to attend high school because they were not common. If students got to attend grades 10-12, they were sent to residential boarding schools with tuition.

The historic schools that once existed in the Caroline area included:

- Big Bend School
- Caroline School,
- Cheddarville School, opened in 1917 for grades 1-9 and closed in 1963. According to one source, Cheddarville was the eighth school opened in the Caroline School District.
- Clear Creek School, opened in 1910 and closed in 1960
- Crammond School, opened in 1926 for grades 1-9 and closed in 1965
- Crooked Creek School, opened in 1911 and closed in 1956
- Dovercourt School, opened in 1917 for grades 1-8 and closed in 1954
- Hazeldell School, opened in 1929 and closed in 1959
- James River School
- North Caroline School, opened in 1936 and closed in 1954
- Pine View School, opened in 1908
- Ricinus School, opened in 1917 and closed after 1950
- Shillo School, opened in 1910 and closed in 1952. This building was designated an Alberta Historic Site in 2011.
- South Caroline School
- South Fork School, opened in 1908 and closed in 1941. This was the first school in Caroline.
- Wooler School, opened in 1914

Today, the 1950s Caroline School building is located at the Wheels of Time Museum located in Caroline. The Caroline School is part of the Wild Rose School Division, which serves Caroline and schools in the surrounding region.

== Demographics ==
In the 2021 Census of Population conducted by Statistics Canada, the Village of Caroline had a population of 470 living in 219 of its 246 total private dwellings, a change of −8.2% from its 2016 population of 512. With a land area of 2.04 km^{2} (0.79 sq mi), it had a population density of 230.4/km^{2} (596.7/sq mi) in 2021.

In the 2016 Census of Population conducted by Statistics Canada, the Village of Caroline recorded a population of 512 living in 233 of its 259 total private dwellings, a 2.2% change from its 2011 population of 501. With a land area of 2.04 km^{2} (0.79 sq mi), it had a population density of 251.0/km^{2} (650.0/sq mi) in 2016.

== Modern Economy ==
In 1968, a large natural gas field valued at $10 billion was discovered near Caroline. It was named Caroline for the community, and subsequently developed by Shell. The gas is sour with about 35% hydrogen sulfide. The sulfur is extracted from the gas and piped in liquid form to a plant at Shantz, about 40 km (25 mi) southeast, where is it made into solid pellets and exported via a spur line of the Canadian Pacific Kansas City railway. In 2019, Shell sold the field and processing plant to Pieridae Energy.

== Modern attractions ==
Attractions in the hamlet include the Caroline Farmers' Market, the Caroline Community Garden, the Caroline Community HUB, and the mural project of the general store. On May long weekend 2026, the local Bighorn Stampede celebrated its 90th anniversary. According to promotional materials, "The Stampede starts on Friday and continues to Sunday night. The weekend includes rodeo, a pancake breakfast on Main Street, a Christian Cowboy Church on Sunday morning and beer gardens every night. The exciting Parade continues along Caroline Main Street on Saturday morning."

The museum in Caroline is called the Caroline Wheels of Time Museum and Historical Village. Developed to preserve and showcase the pioneer heritage of the foothills region, the museum complex features Caroline’s 1950s elementary school building, which houses extensive local archives, genealogical records, and rotating exhibits. Over the decades, the historical society relocated and restored several authentic early 20th-century structures in an open-air historical village. These preserved buildings include the two-storey hand-hewn pioneer John Trunnell log house from the early 1900s, the Anderson Brothers' fur trade and trapper’s cabin, the Big Bend one-room country schoolhouse and teacherage, a vintage fire hall with an operational 1958 fire engine and village jail cell, and the historic 70-year-old All Hallows Chedderville Anglican Church. The museum is open seasonly.

== Notable people ==
- Kurt Browning, world champion figure skater
- Kris Russell, professional ice hockey player
- Ryan Russell, professional ice hockey player
- Jim Vandermeer, professional ice hockey player
- Pete Vandermeer, former professional ice hockey player

== See also ==
- Caroline School
- List of communities in Alberta
- List of hamlets in Alberta
