= Alberta Highway 54 =

Highway in Alberta, Canada

Highway 54

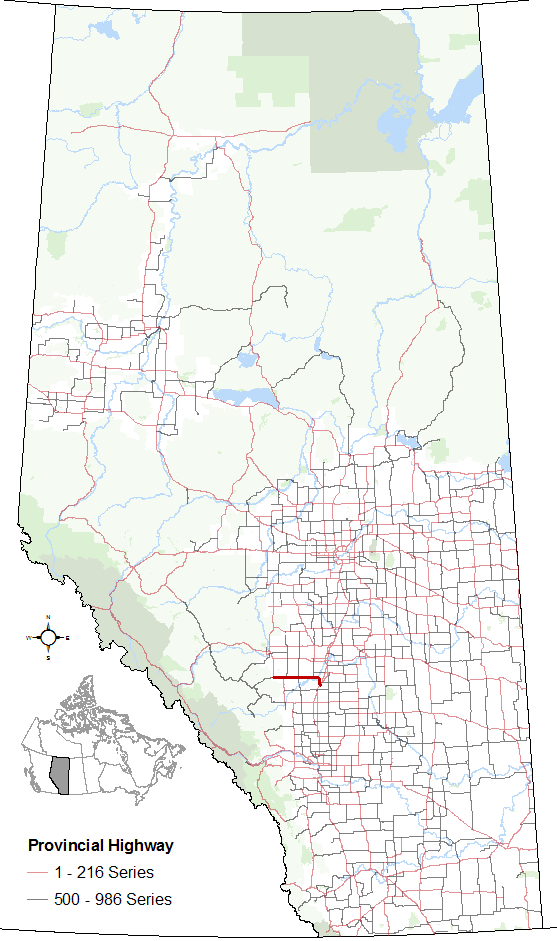

Route information
- Maintained by the Ministry of Transportation and Economic Corridors
- Length: 69.4 km (43.1 mi)

Major junctions
- West end: Highway 22 / Highway 591 west of Caroline
- East end: Highway 2 in Innisfail

Location
- Country: Canada
- Province: Alberta
- Specialized and rural municipalities: Clearwater County, Red Deer County
- Towns: Innisfail
- Villages: Caroline

Highway system
- Alberta Provincial Highway Network; List; Former
| ← Highway 53 | → Highway 55 |

Alberta Provincial Highway No. 54, commonly referred to as Highway 54, is an east–west highway located in central Alberta. It is 70 kilometres (43 mi) in length, starting at Highway 22 (Cowboy Trail), 8 kilometres (5.0 mi) west of the Village of Caroline, and ending at exit 365 of Highway 2 (Queen Elizabeth II Highway) at the south end of the Town of Innisfail.

Highway 54 originally passed through Innisfail's central business district along 50 Street, ending at Highway 2 / Highway 590 interchange. In 2008, Highway 54 was aligned along a new bypass and linked to Highway 2 at an interchange that was previously opened in 2005.

== Major intersections ==
From west to east:

| Rural/specialized municipality | Location | km | mi | Destinations | Notes |
|---|---|---|---|---|---|
| Clearwater County | | 0.0 | 0.0 | Highway 591 west – Ricinus Highway 22 north – Rocky Mountain House | Highway 54 western terminus; west end of Highway 22 concurrency; continues as Highway 591 west |
| Clearwater County | | 0.2 | 0.12 | Crosses the Clearwater River | |
| Clearwater County | Caroline | 8.1 | 5.0 | | |
| Clearwater County | | 13.0 | 8.1 | Highway 22 south – Sundre, Cochrane | East end of Highway 22 concurrency |
| Clearwater County | | 16.3 | 10.1 | Highway 761 north – Stauffer, Leslieville | |
| Red Deer County | | 32.8 | 20.4 | Highway 766 – Eckville | |
| Red Deer County | Spruce View | 37.6 | 23.4 | UAR 114 north (Range Road 31) – Dickson | |
| Red Deer County | | 50.5 | 31.4 | Crosses the Medicine River | |
| Red Deer County | | 52.3 | 32.5 | Highway 781 north – Sylvan Lake | |
| Red Deer County | | 61.0 | 37.9 | Crosses the Red Deer River | |
| Innisfail | | 65.0 | 40.4 | Lakewood Drive / Little Red Deer Road | Former Highway 54 alignment; to 50 Street / Highway 590 east |
| Innisfail | | 69.4 | 43.1 | Highway 2 – Red Deer, Edmonton, Calgary | Interchange; Highway 2 exit 365; Highway 54 eastern terminus |
1.000 mi = 1.609 km; 1.000 km = 0.621 mi: Concurrency terminus
