= Innisfail, Alberta =

Innisfail
- Town
- Town of Innisfail
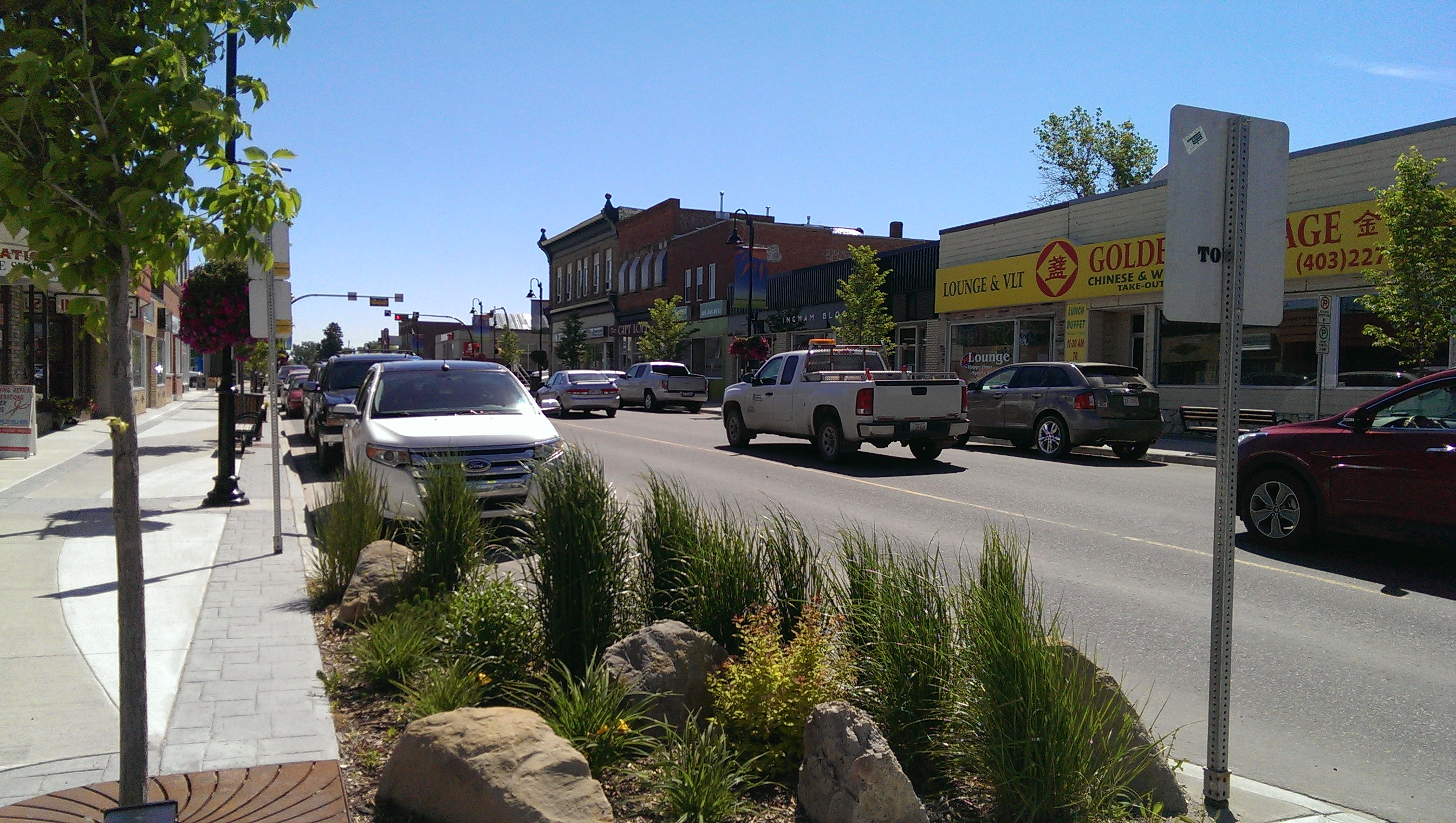
- Mainstreet Innisfail

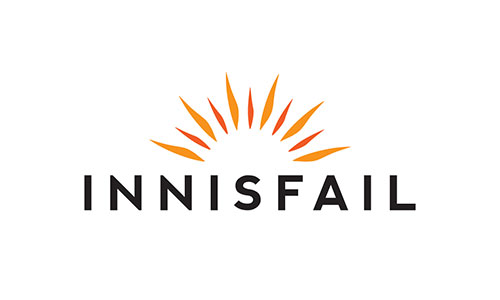
- Flag

- Location of Innisfail Innisfail (Canada)
- Coordinates: 52°01′41″N 113°57′00″W
- Country: Canada
- Province: Alberta
- Region: Central Alberta
- Census division: 8
- Municipal district: Red Deer County
- Incorporated
  - Village: December 15, 1899
  - Town: November 20, 1903

Government
  - Mayor: Jean Barclay
  - Governing body: Innisfail Town Council: Gavin Bates; Donald Harrison; Dale Dunham; Cindy Messaros; Janice Wing; Jason Heistad
  - CAO: Todd Becker
  - MP: Earl Dreeshen

Area (2021)
  - Land: 19.39 km^{2} (7.49 sq mi)
- Elevation: 945 m (3,100 ft)

Population (2022)
  - Total: 7,672
  - Density: 395.7/km^{2} (1,025/sq mi)
- Time zone: UTC−06:00 (Alberta Time)
- Forward sortation area: T4G
- Highways: Highway 2 Highway 54
- Waterways: Gleniffer Lake; Red Deer River
- Website: Official website

Innisfail (/ˈɪnɪsfeɪl/ IN-is-fayl) is a town in central Alberta, Canada. It is located in the Calgary-Edmonton Corridor, south of Red Deer at the junction of Highway 2 and Highway 54.

== History ==
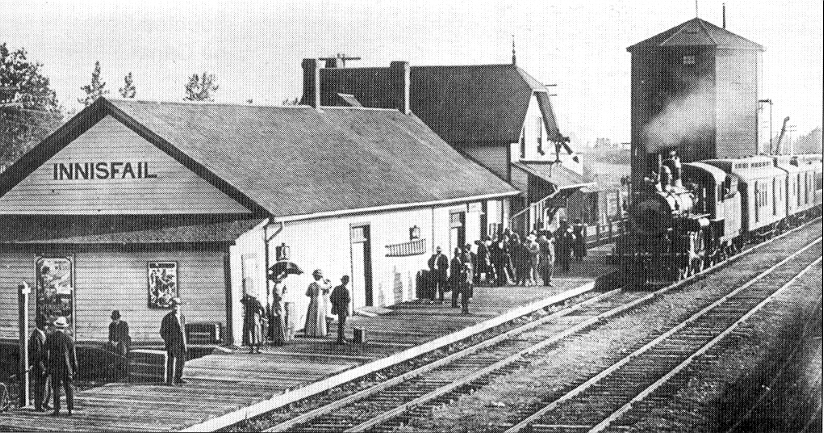
Railway station in the 1890s

The town's name comes from an Irish-language epithet for Ireland, Inis Fáil, "Isle of Destiny". Before this name was adopted, the town was often referred to as "Poplar Grove". Sandy Fraser, Napoleon Remillard, Arthur Content and Bill Kemp settled in the area from 1884 to 1887. These were Innisfail's first settlers. Dr. Henry George was an important physician and coroner for Calgary and Central Alberta. He settled in Innisfail and built a house he called "Lindum Lodge" (this is where the Dr. George/Kemp house is today). Later the house was occupied by Bill Kemp and Kate Jane Kemp, who ran it as a boarding house until the 1960s. More people continued to move to the Innisfail area. The construction of the railroad attracted more settlers and business. One of the first businessmen in the area was G. W. West. He is very important to Innisfail's past as he ran a general store, meat market, and grocery store. He was Innisfail's first proprietor when he moved here in 1891. By the 1900s, Innisfail was a village. Some of the early businesses included the Union Bank, the Murray Hotel, Hotel Alberta, the New York Café, the Modern Café, the Paris Café, the Opera House and the West Store.

== Demographics ==
In the 2021 Census of Population conducted by Statistics Canada, the Town of Innisfail had a population of 7,985 living in 3,352 of its 3,670 total private dwellings, a change of 1.8% from its 2016 population of 7,847. With a land area of 19.39 km^{2} (7.49 sq mi), it had a population density of 411.8/km^{2} (1,066.6/sq mi) in 2021.

In the 2016 Census of Population conducted by Statistics Canada, the Town of Innisfail recorded a population of 7,847 living in 3,169 of its 3,509 total private dwellings, a −0.4% change from its 2011 population of 7,876. With a land area of 19.4 km^{2} (7.5 sq mi), it had a population density of 404.5/km^{2} (1,047.6/sq mi) in 2016.

The Town of Innisfail's 2015 municipal census counted a population of 7,922, a 0.1% increase over its 2012 municipal census population of 7,922. Males made up 42 per cent of the total population, while females made up 43 per cent (13 per cent of the population did not indicate their gender). The three largest five-year age categories within Innisfail's population were between 75 and over, 50 to 54 years of age, and 55 to 59 years of age. Combined, these three categories accounted for 21 per cent of the town's total population.

== Attractions ==
Innisfail is home to the Daines Pro Rodeo, Anthony Henday Campground, Dr. George / Kemp House Museum, Discovery Wildlife Park & Campground, a downtown with stores, and the Historical Village museum. Napoleon Trails Gravesite is also nearby.

The Royal Canadian Mounted Police (RCMP) dog training facility is located 2 km south of Innisfail.

== Education ==
According to the National Household Survey conducted by Statistics Canada in 2011, Innisfail has a comparatively high ratio of residents with no certificate, diploma or degree (based on total population aged 25 to 64). In particular, 1 in 5 males (20.2%) between the ages of 25 and 64 do not possess a certificate, diploma or degree at any level of education. In comparison to other communities in Central Alberta, males aged 25 to 64 in Ponoka, Olds and Sylvan Lake had rates of 11.9%, 14.1% and 14.9%, respectively. The province of Alberta ratio for males aged 25 to 64 with no certificate, diploma or degree is 13.2%. This puts Innisfail 53% above the provincial average for males.

== Sports ==
The Innisfail Eagles of Allan Cup Hockey West play out of Innisfail Twin Arena.

== Transportation ==
Innisfail is served by the Innisfail Aerodrome, which is located northwest of the town.

== Notable people ==
- Garry Bauman, former professional hockey player
- Ray Bennett, NHL assistant coach and Stanley Cup champion
- Sharon Christian, artist
- Devin Dreeshen, Minister of Agriculture and Forestry of Alberta, 2019-. Member of the Legislative Assembly of Alberta for Innisfail-Sylvan Lake, 2018-.
- Shane Gaalaas, drummer/multi-instrumentalist
- Dallas Gaume, former professional hockey player
- Rebecca Jenkins, actress/singer
- Hal Kvisle, former CEO of TransCanada Corporation
- Molly Lazechko, American politician
- Matthew Yeats, former professional hockey player

== See also ==
- List of communities in Alberta
- List of towns in Alberta
- Antler Hill, an area just north
