= Red Deer River =

River in Alberta and Saskatchewan, Canada

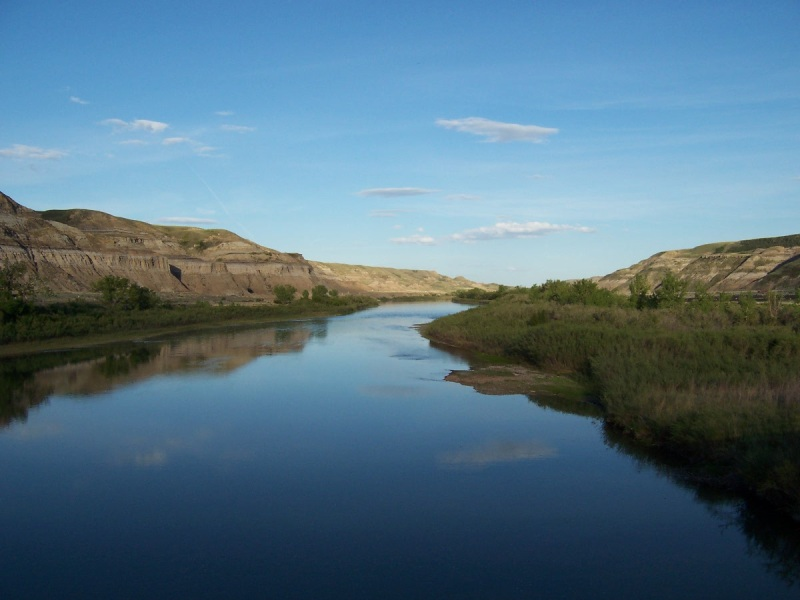
- Red Deer River in Drumheller, Alberta

Location
- Country: Canada

Physical characteristics
- Source
  - location: Sawback Range, Red Deer Lakes
  - coordinates: 51°31′55.96″N 116°02′31.24″W
  - elevation: 2,200 m (7,200 ft)
- Mouth
  - location: South Saskatchewan River near Empress
  - coordinates: 50°55′23.34″N 109°53′41.75″W
  - elevation: 579 m (1,900 ft)
- Length: 724 km (450 mi)
- Basin size: 45,100 km^{2} (17,400 sq mi)
- Discharge
  - average: 70 m^{3}/s (2,500 cu ft/s)

The Red Deer River is a river in Alberta and a small portion of Saskatchewan, Canada. It is a major tributary of the South Saskatchewan River and is part of the larger Saskatchewan / Nelson system that empties into Hudson Bay. Communities located along the Red Deer River include Sundre, Red Deer, Drumheller, and Empress, The city of Brooks, as well as Dinosaur Provincial Park, are also located in the Red Deer River Basin.

The river has a total length of 724 km (450 mi) and a drainage area of 45,100 km^{2} (17,400 sq mi). Its mean discharge is 70 m^{3}/s (2,500 cu ft/s).

The river is named for the translation of a native term for the river, wâwâskêsiw sîpiy, which means "elk river" in the Cree language. "Red deer" was an alternative name for elk, referring to a closely related Eurasian species.

A glacial flood about 18,000 years ago eroded out a portion of this basin and apparently all or most of the scenic badlands bearing the dinosaur and other Cretaceous fossils.

== History ==
Joseph Tyrrell discovered a huge coal seam here in 1883, besides large dinosaur skeletons.

The Red Deer River has flooded numerous times with the largest recorded flood occurring in 1915. Other years with significant flooding include 2005 and 2013. Various flood mitigation projects, such as building dykes, dams, and diversion channels, have been developed and implemented over the years.

The Dickson Dam — the only major dam currently along the course of the Red Deer River — was built in 1983 creating Gleniffer Lake.

=== 2013 Alberta flood ===
In June 2013, Alberta experienced heavy rainfall that triggered catastrophic flooding throughout much of the southern half of the province along the Bow, Elbow, Highwood, Oldman, and Red Deer rivers and tributaries. Twenty-four municipalities declared local states of emergency as water levels rose and numerous communities were placed under evacuation orders. The Royal Canadian Mounted Police stated four people may have drowned near High River. Over 100,000 people in the region were displaced.

=== Flood and drought mitigation projects ===
In 1920, William Pearce produced a report for Canada's Department of Reclamation Services that outlined a flood and drought mitigation project for Alberta and Saskatchewan in which the Red Deer River played an important roll. The project was reviewed for feasibility in 1935 and 1945 by the Prairie Farm Rehabilitation Administration (PFRA).

The 1935 Red Deer River diversion project was reviewed by the PFRA. It involved the construction of multiple dams and reservoirs at the headwaters of the Red Deer River and the building of a large diversion channel that would connect the Red Deer River east to Sullivan Lake. Sullivan Lake would then be turned into a large reservoir capable of storing an estimated 2,405,744 dam^{3} (1,950,368 acre⋅ft) of water. Water then would be redistributed east to Saskatchewan via Sounding Creek and southeast to numerous creeks, such as Bull Pond Berry, Blood Indian, Alkali. The project would have brought irrigation to 5,710 km^{2} (2,200 sq mi) of land.

The 1945 North Saskatchewan Irrigation Project, which was another grand irrigation project conceptualized by Pearce, was also reviewed by the PFRA. This one involved the diverting of water from the North Saskatchewan River to the Red Deer River via the Clearwater River near Rocky Mountain House. This project required the construction of a dam across the Red Deer at Content Bridge, and the building of a 128-kilometre (80 mi) long canal northeast from the dam to Buffalo Lake. Buffalo Lake would then be raised 6 metres (20 ft) and turned into a reservoir. Water would then be distributed to drought-prone areas bringing the total irrigable land between the two projects up to 76,890 km^{2} (29,690 sq mi). Neither of these grand projects were initiated.

== Course ==
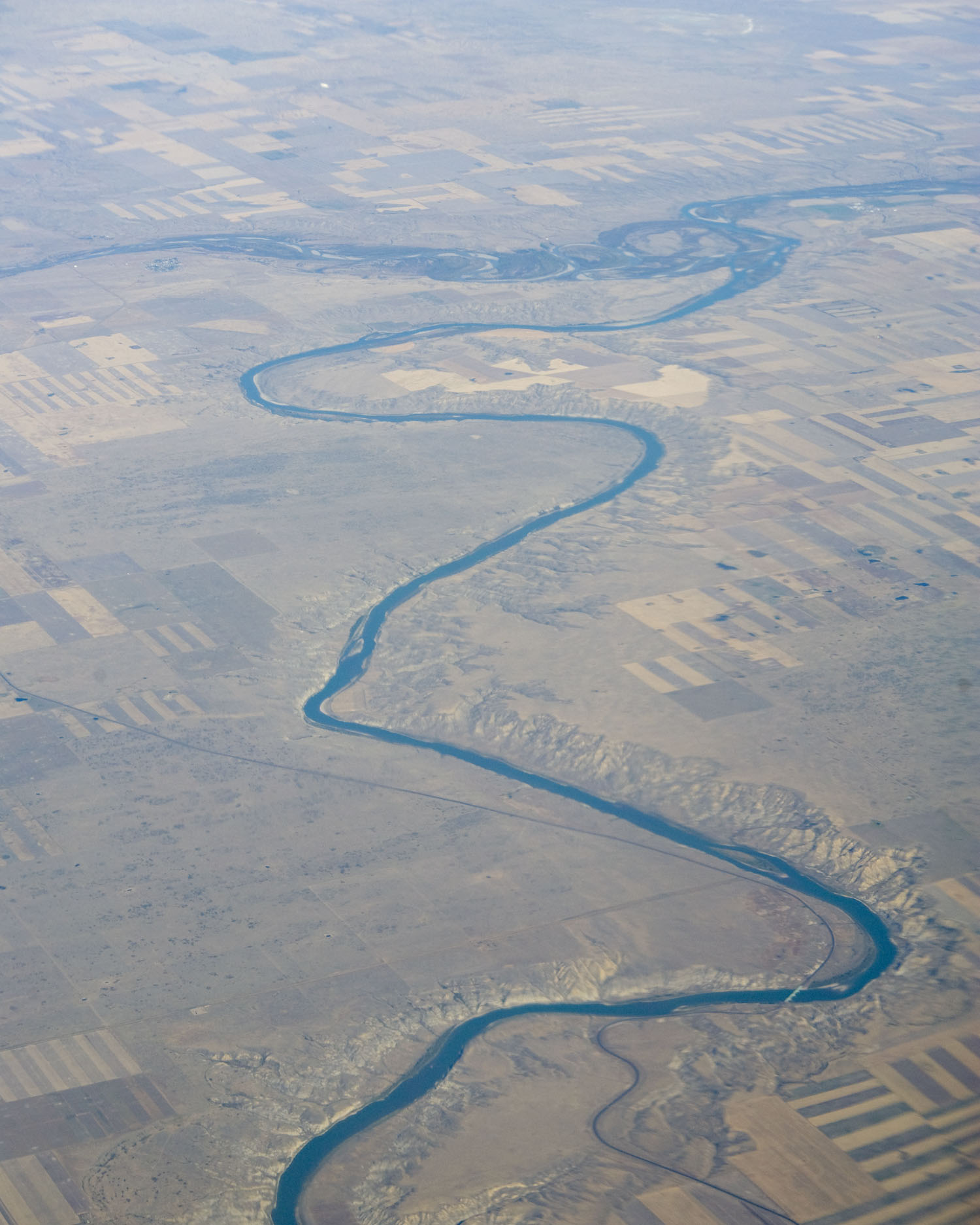
The Red Deer River (upper left) merging into the South Saskatchewan River east of Empress, Alberta

The river originates on the eastern slopes of the Canadian Rockies, in the Sawback Range near the Skoki Valley inside Banff National Park, and then flows east through the mountains and foothills region. It turns north-east before Sundre and flows to an artificial reservoir named Gleniffer Lake, created in 1983 by the Dickson Dam and keeps this heading to the city of Red Deer, where it turns east, and then south before Stettler. It flows south with its valley protected by provincial and regional parks such as Tolman Badlands Heritage Rangeland, Dry Island Buffalo Jump Provincial Park, Dry Island Corridor and Midland Provincial Park. At Drumheller it has a south-east direction, and while it flows through Dinosaur Provincial Park it turns east and flows to the Alberta/Saskatchewan border, which it crosses at Empress. It flows for 16 km (9.9 mi) through Saskatchewan before it merges into the South Saskatchewan River.

== Environmental concerns ==
=== Pipeline leaks ===
The Red Deer River is the water source for the City of Red Deer and the surrounding area. Pipelines cross under the river and there have been leaks disrupting access to potable water. Increased water flow of the Red Deer River system during heavy rainfall in June 2008 eroded supporting soil, freely exposing a section of Pembina Pipeline Corporation's Cremona crude oil pipeline to the Red Deer River currents. About 75 to 125 barrels (11,900 to 19,900 L; 2,600 to 4,400 imp gal; 3,200 to 5,200 US gal) of crude oil flowed upstream from the break point under a Red Deer River channel, leaving an oily sheen on Gleniffer Reservoir and 6,800 kg (15,000 lb) of oil-soaked debris. The remediation was not completed until 2011.

Heavy rains in early June 2012 caused a similar but larger leak on a Plains Midstream Canada 46-year-old pipeline on a Red Deer River tributary, Jackson Creek, Alberta (51°52′19″N 114°36′23″W) near Gleniffer Lake and Dickson Dam, which spilled approximately 1,000 and 3,000 barrels (160,000 and 480,000 L; 35,000 and 105,000 imp gal; 42,000 and 126,000 US gal) of light sour crude oil into the Red Deer River.

== Tributaries ==
Canadian Rockies and Rocky Mountain Foothills

- Red Deer Lakes
- Douglas Creek
  - Douglas Lake, Donald Lake, Gwendolyn Lake
- Drummond Creek
- Skeleton (Horseshoe) Lake
- McConnell Creek
- Divide Creek
- Pipit Lake
- Snowflake Lake
- Tyrell Creek
- Scalp Creek
- Bighorn Creek
- Eagle Creek
- Wildhorse Creek
- Panther River
  - Dormer River
- Wigwam Creek
- Yara Creek
- McCue Creek
- Logan Creek
- Bear Creek
- Burnt Timber Creek
- Bull Creek
- Vam Creek
- Brown Creek
- Williams Creek
- Helmer Creek
- Cartier Creek
- Coalcamp Creek

Central Alberta

- Nitchi Creek
- Fallentimber Creek
- Bearberry Creek
- Jackson Creek
- James River
- Schrader Creek
- Eagle Creek
- Raven River
  - North Raven River
- Little Red Deer River
- Medicine River
- Kenning Lake
- Sylvan Creek
- Piper Creek
- Blindman River
- Threehills Creek
- Kneehills Creek
- Rosebud River
- Bullpound Creek
- Berry Creek
- Blood Indian Creek
- Ghostpine Creek
  - Pine Lake
- Waskasoo Creek
  - Piper Creek
- Alkali Creek

The waters of Ewing Lake, Little Fish Lake also flow into the Red Deer River.

== Fish species ==
Sport fish include: walleye, northern pike, sauger, lake whitefish, yellow perch, burbot, lake sturgeon, mountain whitefish, goldeye, brown trout, bull trout, rainbow trout, brook trout, and cutthroat trout.

Other fish include: emerald shiner, river shiner, spottail shiner, flathead chub, longnose dace, quillback (quillback carpsucker), longnose sucker, white sucker, shorthead redhorse, silver redhorse, perch, spoonhead sculpin, lake chub, northern pearl dace, northern redbelly dace, finescale dace, fathead minnow and brook stickleback.

== Gallery ==
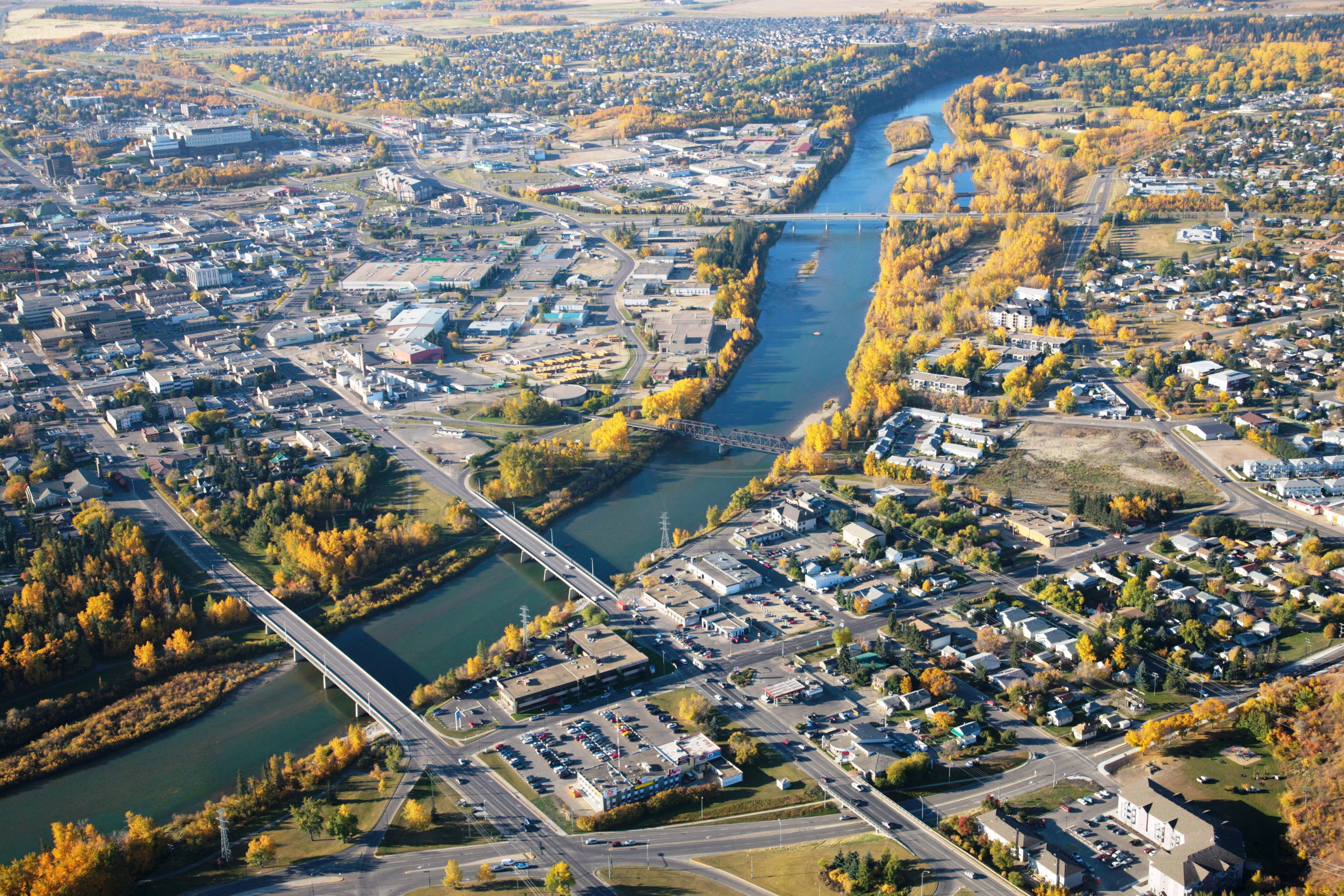
Flowing through the city of Red Deer

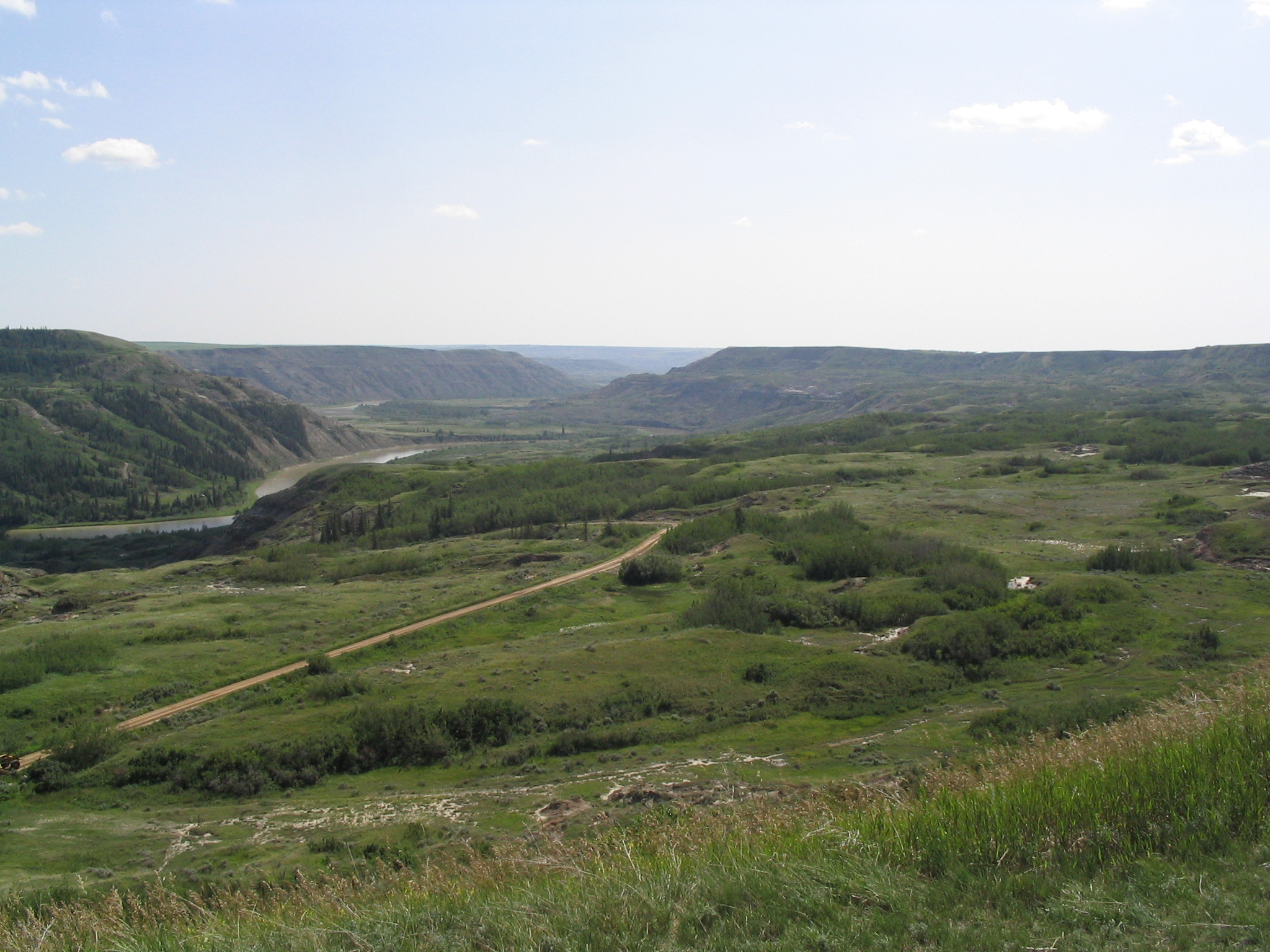
Through Dry Island Buffalo Jump Provincial Park

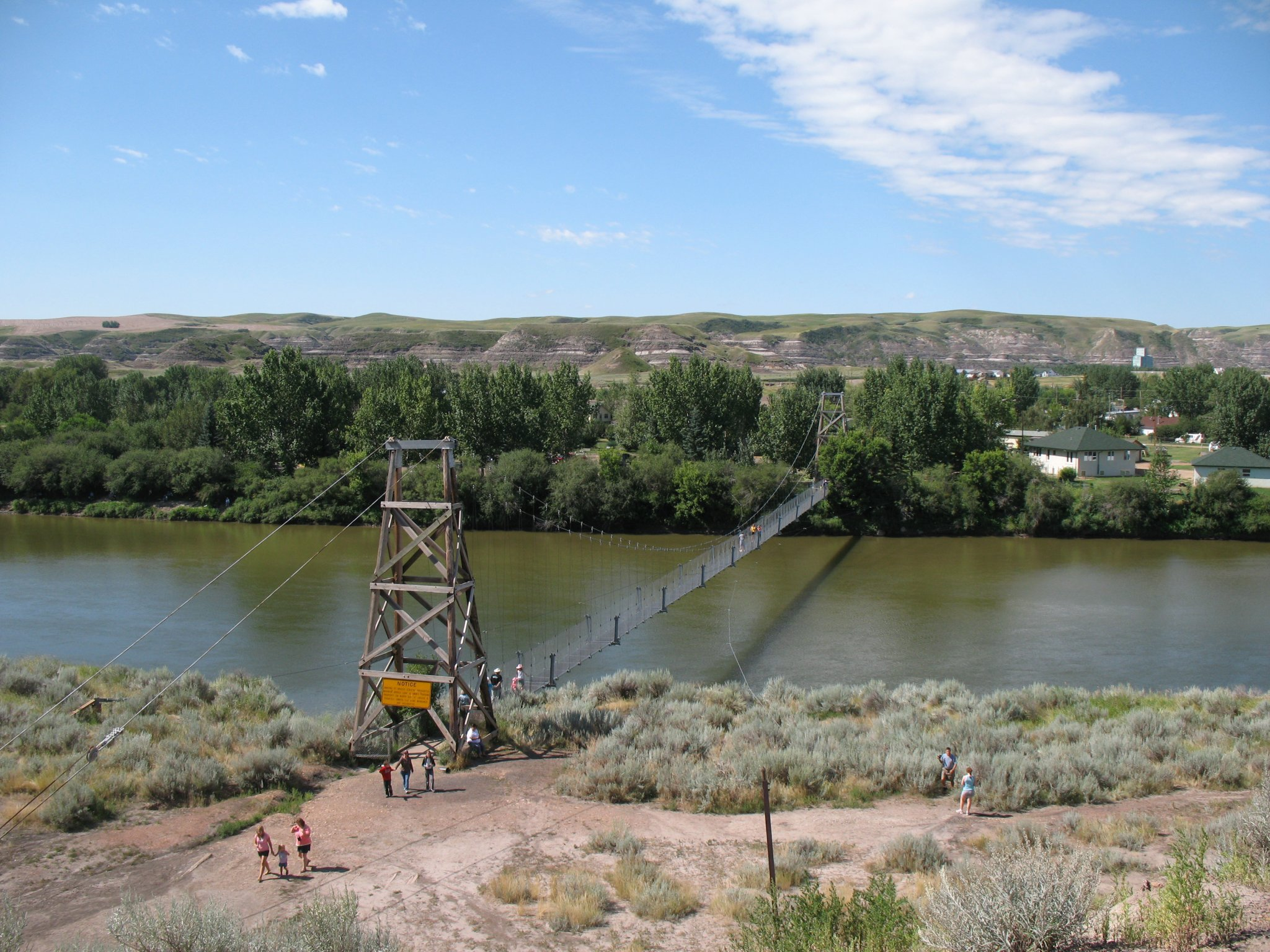
Star Mine Suspension Bridge in Rosedale

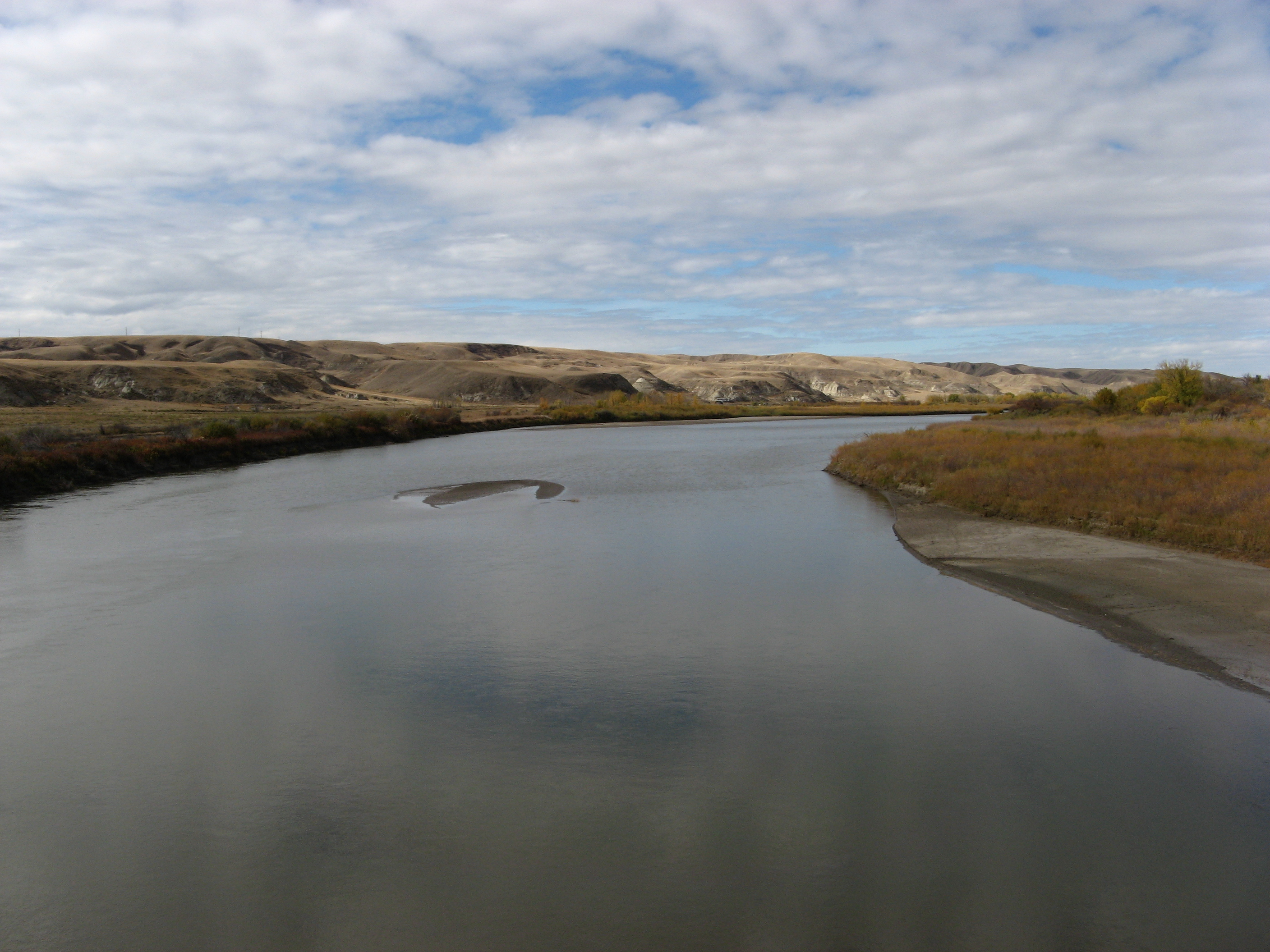
Red Deer River north of emerald shiner Jenner, Alberta

== See also ==
- List of crossings of the Red Deer River
- List of longest rivers of Canada
- List of rivers of Alberta
- List of rivers of Saskatchewan
- Glacial Lake Bassano
