= Bearberry (disambiguation) =

Bearberry is three species of shrubs in the genus Arctostaphylos.

- Arctostaphylos alpina, alpine bearberry
- Arctostaphylos rubra, red fruit bearberry
- Arctostaphylos uva-ursi, common bearberry

Bearberry may also refer to other plants:

- Arbutus menziesii, a tree native to North America
- Rhamnus purshiana, a species of American buckthorn
- Cranberry, evergreen dwarf shrubs in the genus Vaccinium
- Bearberry Honeysuckle, a North American shrub, Lonicera involucrata
- Bearberry Cotoneaster, a low shrub from China

and also to:

- Bearberry, Alberta, an unincorporated community
- Bearberry bell, Epinotia nemorivaga, a species of moth
- Bearberry Creek, a stream in Alberta, Canada
