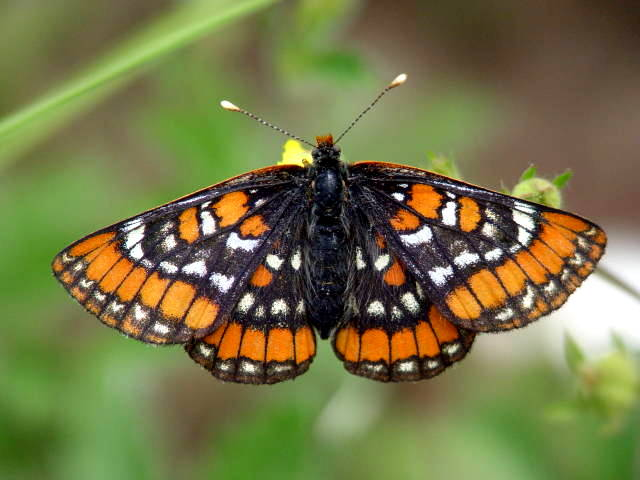
- Female

Conservation status
- Vulnerable (NatureServe)

Scientific classification
- Domain: Eukaryota
- Kingdom: Animalia
- Phylum: Arthropoda
- Class: Insecta
- Order: Lepidoptera
- Family: Nymphalidae
- Genus: Euphydryas
- Species: E. gillettii

Binomial name
- Euphydryas gillettii (Barnes, 1897)

= Euphydryas gillettii =

Species of butterfly

Euphydryas gillettii, or Gillette's checkerspot, is a species of butterfly, common in western North America from British Columbia to Oregon and from the Rocky Mountains to the Pacific Ocean. The wingspan is 36–45 mm (1.4–1.8 in). The species was first described by William Barnes in 1897.

Adults fly from mid-June to early August in Alberta. Its habitats include valleys, glades, open wooded areas in mountains, and streams.

Caterpillars primarily feed on bracted honeysuckle (Lonicera involucrata). They also have been observed in the wild feeding on laying its eggs on little pink elephant (Pedicularis groenlandica), western valerian (Valeriana occidentalis), and sweetberry honeysuckle (Lonicera caerulea) in Idaho. Captive experiments show no significant differences in survivorship of caterpillars feeding on these alternate food sources in comparison with its more common host plant. Adults feed on nectar from a variety of flowers including wild geranium and yellow composites.

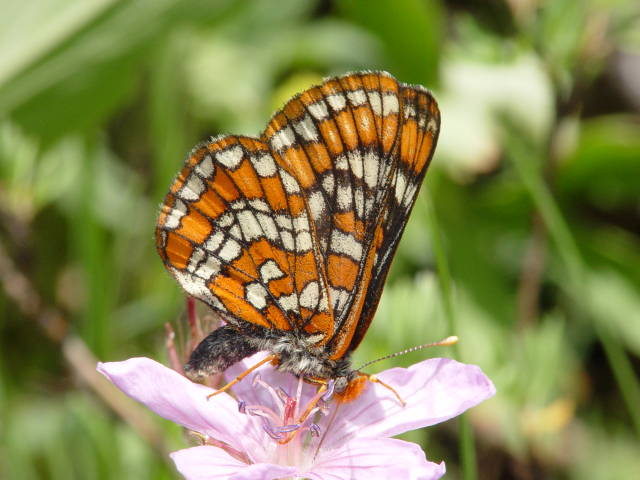
Female

== Taxonomy ==
E. gillettii is in the subgenus Hypodryas The clade members are

- Euphydryas maturna (Linnaeus, 1758)
- Euphydryas intermedia =Euphydryas ichnea (Boisduval, 1833)
- Euphydryas cynthia (Schiffermüller, 1775)
- Euphydryas iduna (Dalman, 1816)
- Euphydryas gillettii (Barnes, 1897)
