= Lake Bassano =

Proglacial lake in Alberta, Canada

Coordinates: 51.1153°N 113.0060°W

Lake Bassano was a proglacial lake that formed in the Late Pleistocene during the deglaciation of south-central Alberta by the impoundment of a re-established drainage system and addition of glacial meltwater. It is associated with the development of through-flowing drainage within the Red Deer River basin in particular, and the South Saskatchewan drainage network in general. Approximately 7,500 square kilometres (2,900 sq mi) of the Bassano basin is covered with lacustrine sediments. These sediments are bordered by the topographically higher Buffalo Lake Moraine to the west, the Suffield Moraine to the east and the Lethbridge Moraine to the south.

The transmission of water through the basin was ultimately controlled by the regional topography and the position of the ice front. As the Laurentide Ice Sheet retreated, lower outlet channels were exposed. The lake levels at any given time were constrained by the elevation of the lowest drainage channel. As Glacial Lake Bassano, and the proglacial lake system as a whole developed, throughflow in individual channels waxed, waned, and reversed, depending on the systemic controls.

== Proglacial Lake System ==
The retreat of the late Wisconsinan Laurentide Ice Sheet in Alberta was accompanied by the deposition of extensive areas of proglacial lake sediments associated with ice frontal positions. These lakes formed as a result of impoundment of the re-established proglacial drainage system and glacial meltwater.. estimates that roughly 50% of Alberta was occupied by these short-lived lakes. The mapping of sediments deposited by lacustrine and related glacial processes allows the determination of ice-frontal positions at sequential recessional phases, for example, constructed a detailed and comprehensive series of glacial-marginal positions for north-central Alberta. There are, however, a wide variety of chronological interpretations and problems related to the proposed ice-marginal positions in Southern Alberta. Work on individual glacial lakes in Southern Alberta has not produced a definitive synthesis of the deglacial landscape. Early work was hampered by a lack of precise elevational control; later work has suffered from a paucity of chronological control and the lack of any detailed study of the integrated relationships between the proglacial lakes in southern Alberta. By topographic analysis, it is possible to accurately determine the sequence of formation and drainage, as well as the maximum and minimum elevations of the proglacial lakes

In southern Alberta, the network of proglacial lakes lowered, with recession of the Laurentide Ice Sheet, from the 1,100 metres (3,600 ft) maximum elevation of Glacial Lake McLeod to the final 680 metres (2,230 ft) elevation of Glacial Lake Empress. The confluence of flow through Glacial Lakes Drumheller, Gleichen and Lethbridge utilized Etzikom Coulee to enter the Missouri Drainage System. When Etzikom Coulee was abandoned at 915 metres (3,002 ft) (the height of the Lethbridge Moraine Divide) discharge from the lakes was entirely within Alberta.

Glacial Lake Drumheller abandoned the Strathmore Channel at 945 metres (3,100 ft), whereupon discharge was directed through the smaller Crowfoot channel until 915 metres (3,002 ft). At this elevation, flow must have been diverted further to the east, over the Bassano basin. Glacial Lake Gleichen abandoned the southward-flowing McGregor Lake Channel at 860 metres (2,820 ft) and discharged eastward into Glacial Lake Bassano until channelization occurred at 850 metres (2,790 ft).

With recession of the ice, Glacial Lake Lethbridge lowered and extended eastward, forming Glacial Lake Taber, whose upper level was controlled by Chin Coulee at 915 metres (3,002 ft). Subsequent drainage flowed through Forty Mile Coulee until 792 metres (2,598 ft) and along the valley of the South Saskatchewan, which became channelized at 760 metres (2,490 ft). Glacial Lake Medicine Hat formed at roughly 760 metres (2,490 ft) and ponding at that location was associated with the formation of Glacial Lake Empress to the north at roughly the same elevation.

Glacial Lake Bassano existed from a maximum elevation of 915 metres (3,002 ft) until final drainage at 690–700 metres (2,260–2,300 ft). Its initiation coincides with the abandonment of southward-flowing drainage into the Missouri System and the beginning of drainage within Alberta. Together with Glacial Lake Tilley to the south, Glacial Lake Bassano received the discharge from over 1,000 kilometres (620 mi) of the Laurentide Ice Sheet and associated proglacial lakes.
