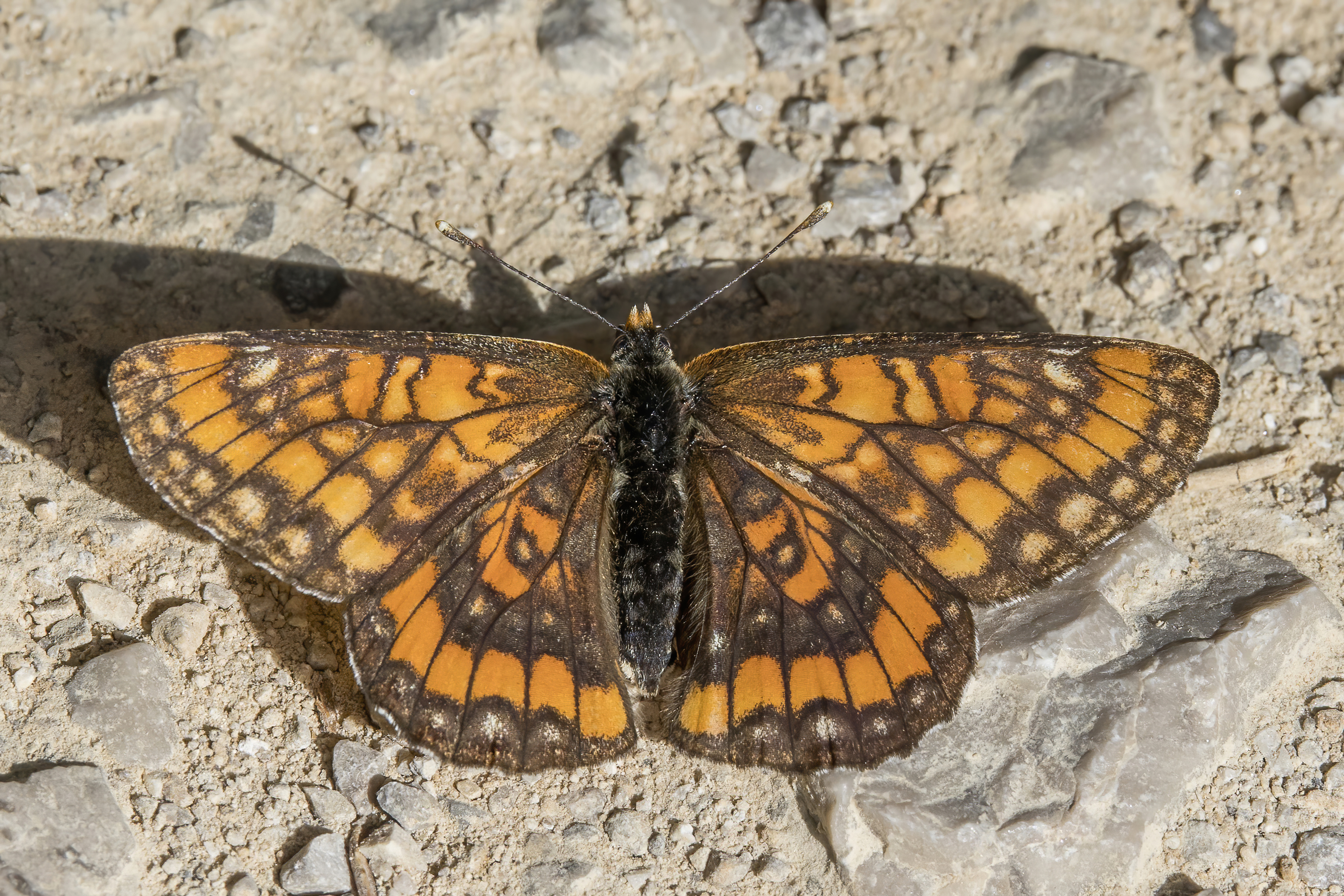
- Rakov Škocjan, Slovenia

Conservation status
- Data Deficient (IUCN 2.3)

Scientific classification
- Kingdom: Animalia
- Phylum: Arthropoda
- Class: Insecta
- Order: Lepidoptera
- Family: Nymphalidae
- Subfamily: Nymphalinae
- Tribe: Melitaeini
- Genus: Euphydryas
- Species: E. maturna

Binomial name
- Euphydryas maturna (Linnaeus, 1758)

Synonyms
- Hypodryas maturna; Euphydryas maturna maturna; Papilio maturna Linnaeus, 1758

= Scarce fritillary =

Species of butterfly

The scarce fritillary (Euphydryas maturna) is a species of butterfly in the family Nymphalidae. It is found in Austria, Bulgaria, Czech Republic, Finland, France, Germany, Greece, Hungary, Kazakhstan, Lithuania, Luxembourg, Poland, Romania, Russia, Serbia and Montenegro, and Sweden. and East across the Palearctic to Mongolia.

== Description ==
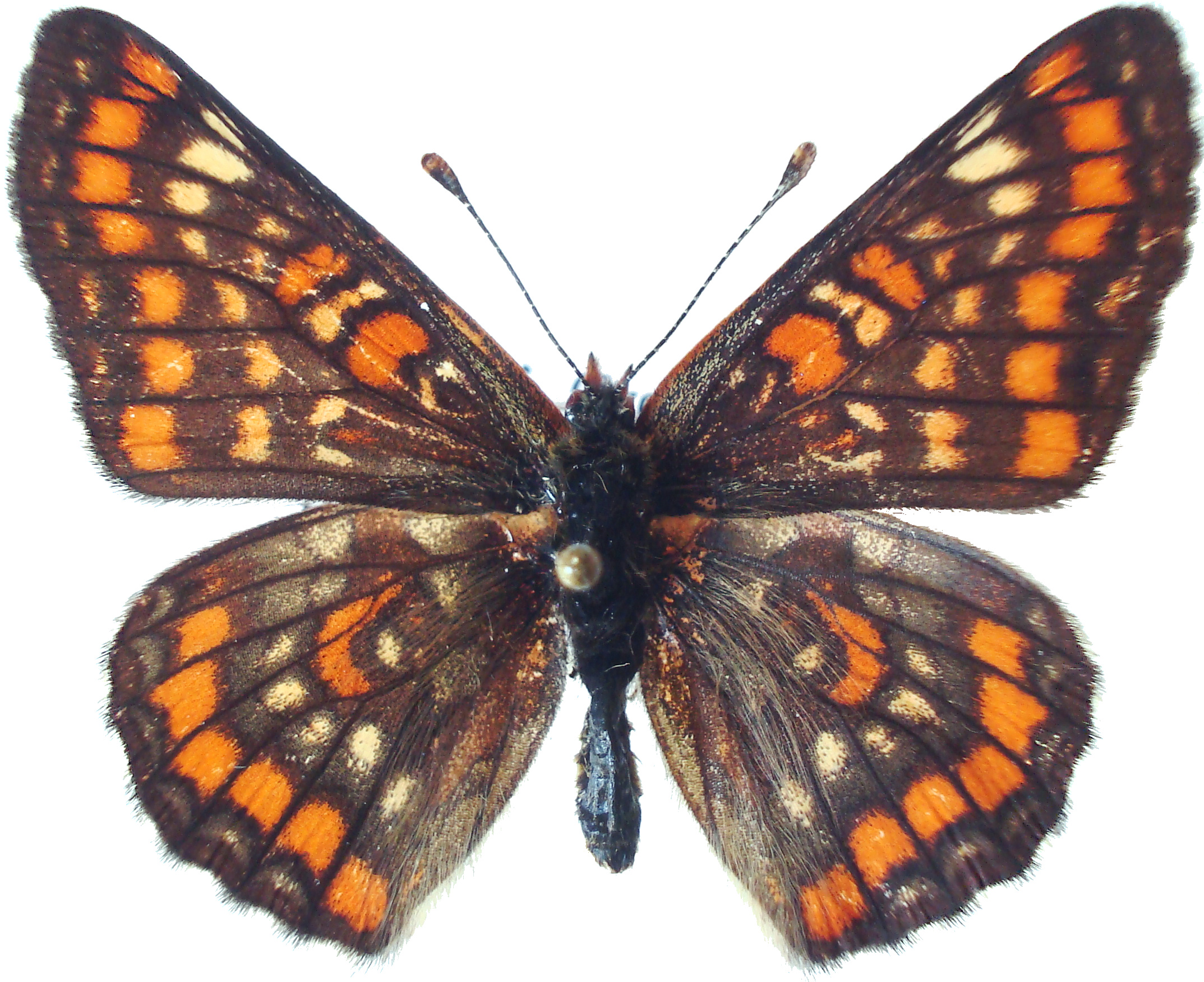
E. maturna maturna from Grodno, Belarus. Dorsal side

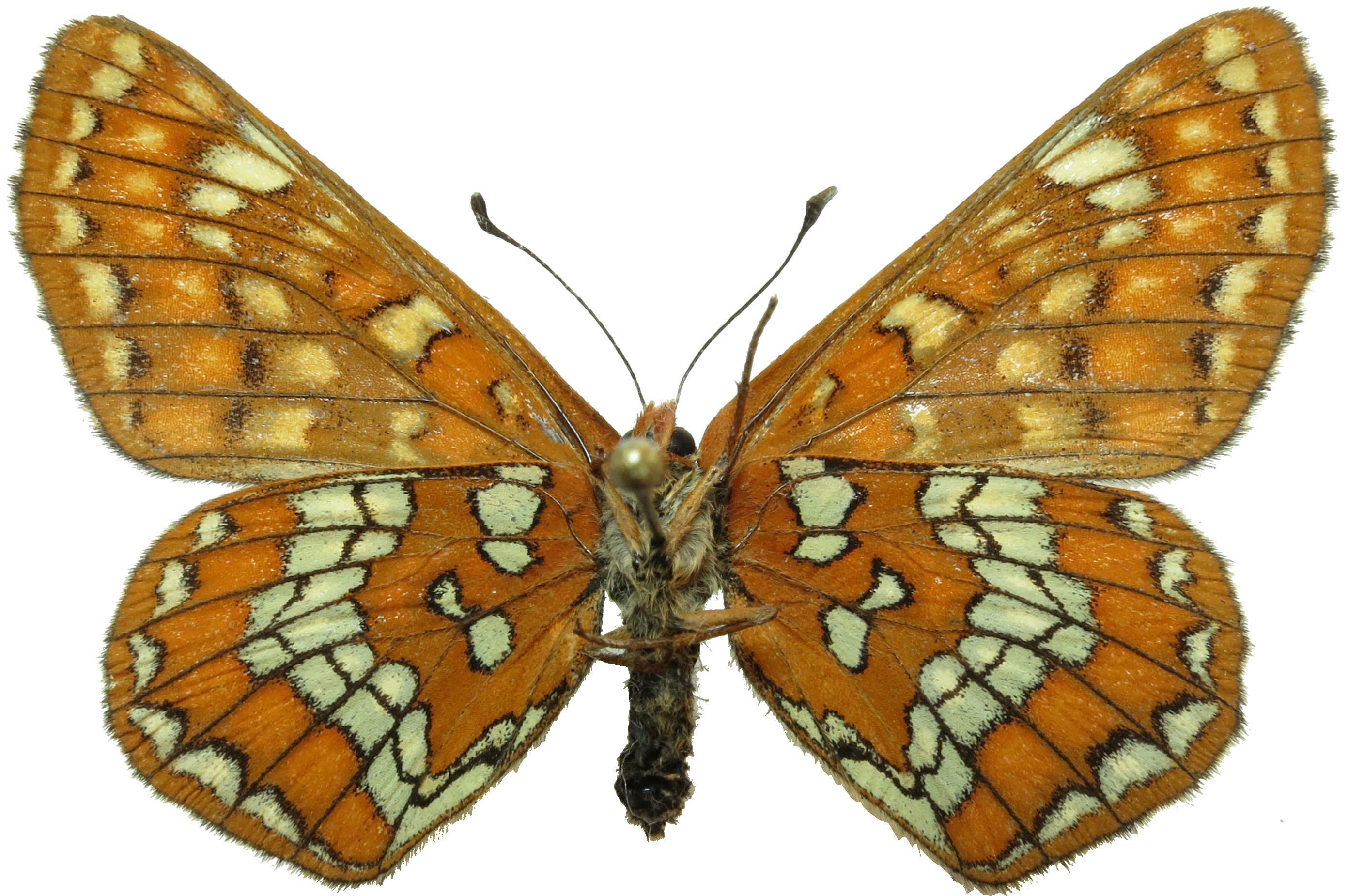
E. maturna maturna from Nevesjnie, Bosnia. Ventral side

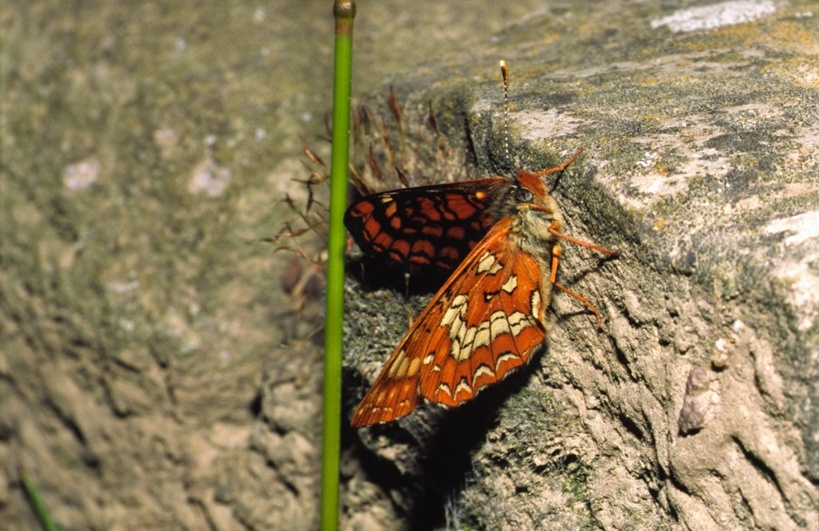
Underside

The scarce fritillary's wingspan ranges from 35 to 42 mm. The upper sides of the wings have a black-brown ground colour with a pattern of orange bands and a distinguished pattern of white spots. The veins and margins are black and brown.

The pigmentation on the wing underside is orange and the details are blurred. The underside forewings exhibit a wide range of different shades of light and dark orange, the underside hindwings are orange with black-bordered white spots. Especially the pattern of the front wing undersides is washed out.

The caterpillar larvae reach up to 30 mm in length when fully grown. They are dark colored with strikingly bright, yellow spots. They have a large amount of dark tubercules and hairs across its length.

The pupae tend to be white with dark spots and yellow warts on the abdomen.

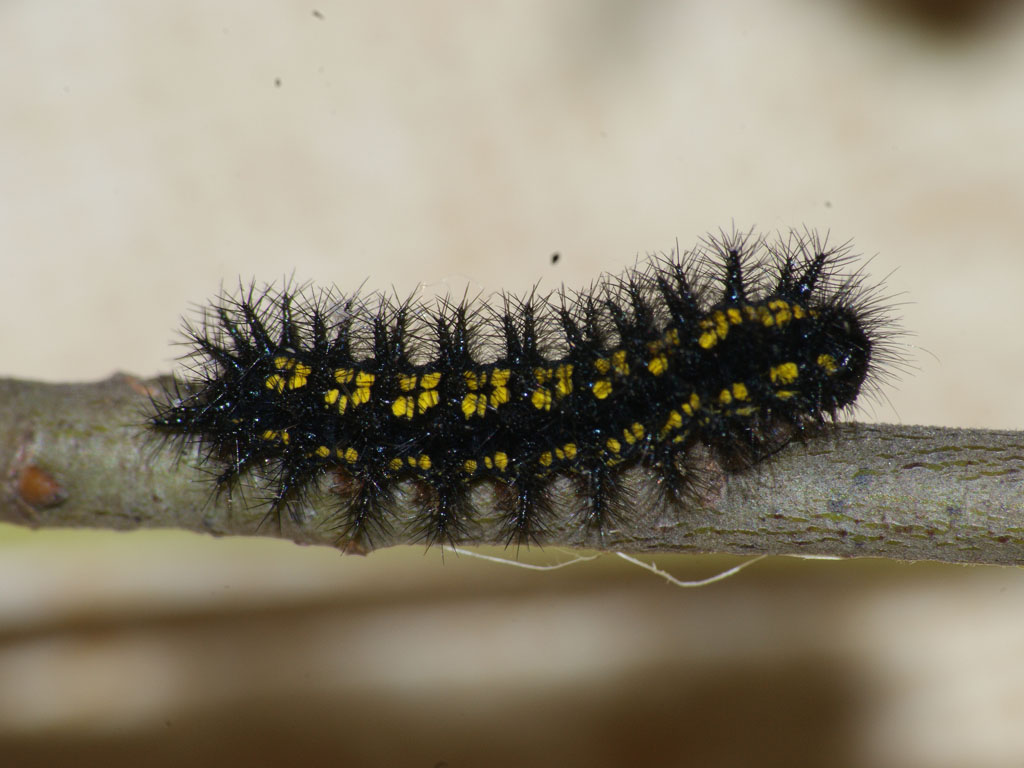
larva

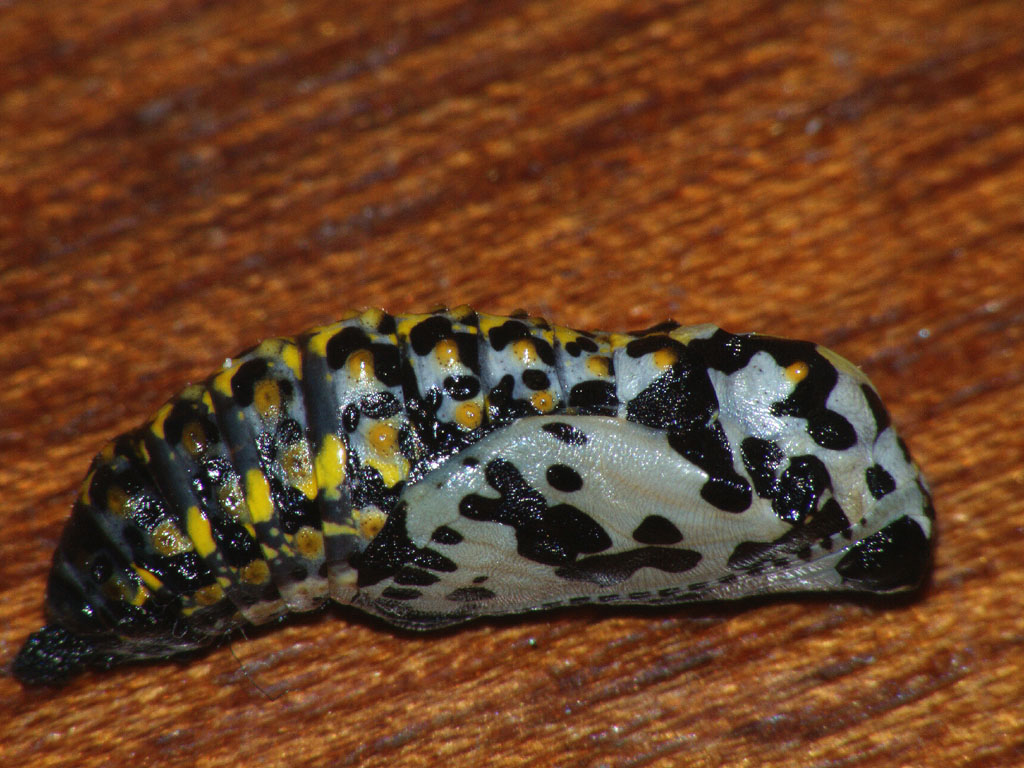
pupa

== Description in Seitz ==
M. maturna L. (= cynthia Esp., mysia Hbn.) (65a). One of the larger species. Basal and outer areas of the wings bright red-brown, the disc spotted with white. Underside orange-red, marked with black; the forewing with yellow spots in the cell, beyond the cross-veins and before the distal margin. The hindwing beneath has 3 rows of spots: one near the base, of which a lunule in the cell stands a little separate, further a median band divided by a black line, and thirdly a row of marginal lunules edged proximally by black arcs. In the Ural it is represented by uralensis Stgr. (65a)[replaced by E. m. staudingeri Wnukowsky, 1929], in which the yellowish white spots of the upperside are more prominent, approaching iduna [Euphydryas iduna (Dalman, 1816)], which may be regarded the arctic form of maturna.

== Similar species ==
Other Euphydryas especially Euphydryas intermedia.

== Taxonomy ==
Nec maturna Hubner = Hypodryas cynthia [Denis & Schiffermüller], 1775

E.maturna is in the subgenus Hypodryas The clade members are

- Euphydryas maturna (Linnaeus, 1758)
- Euphydryas intermedia =Euphydryas ichnea (Boisduval, 1833)
- Euphydryas cynthia (Schiffermüller, 1775)
- Euphydryas iduna (Dalman, 1816)
- Euphydryas gillettii (Barnes, 1897)

== Food sources ==
=== Larva ===
Scarce fritillary larvae only feed on the leaves of ash trees (Fraxinus excelsior) at first. Caterpillars that hibernated once already start feeding on honeysuckle (Lonicera xylosteum), goat willow (Salix caprea) and common aspen (Populus tremula), as well as a diverse variety of forb.

== Habitat ==
The butterfly scarce fritillary can be found in moist, light terrain which is overgrown by ash trees and ash bushes. Its population has decreased rapidly in Central Europe and in some areas they are no longer to be found.

== Occurrence ==
Scarce fritillary can be found in East- and Central Europe, in the Caucasus, Ural Mountains, in the East of Kazakhstan, in South- and Western Siberia, in the Zabaykalsky Krai and in Mongolia. They appear very limited in locally restricted areas while their population is widely spread. Scarce fritillary inhabit regions varying in altitudes of 200 to 1,000 metres. In Germany for example they only appear in the Swabian Alb, in the southern area of the Steigerwald, in the area of Leipzig and in the Marzoller Au near Bad Reichenhall.

== Lifestyle ==
The butterflies keep themselves rather hidden and are usually inconspicuous in their behavior. Those that are encountered by humans are mostly the males. They like to sit on forest trails drinking water from puddles. Scarce fritillary are rarely found on flowers; instead they prefer the blossoms of bushes; for example, common privet (Ligustrum vulgare) and wayfaring tree (Viburnum lantana).

The butterfly's population fluctuates extremely every year. Groups that accrete well over the years are usually depleted by increasing overpopulation of parasitic flies and wasps. The scarce fritillary butterflies only slowly recover after such invasion, often needing years to replenish their population.

== Life cycle ==
The females lay their striking red eggs on the undersides of ash leaves for which they often choose seedlings that are approximately 2 meters (6.5 feet) high. The entire hoard is laid in a layered cluster with a diameter of only 1 cm (0.39 inch). The choice of the right place for the eggs is very important as it has to fit certain criteria. Temperature, humidity and light conditions all have to be met exactly. This is why, occasionally, if it has been a strong year for the population of the scarce fritillary butterfly, several females can be seen laying their eggs on the same leaf. After hatching, the young caterpillars weave a cocoon around the entire leaf which they then all inhabit together. They eat only certain parts of the leaves, leaving a very distinct damage pattern of curled up leaves and their cocoons behind which makes the species easy to identify. From the end of June onwards the caterpillars, which until then have grown to an approximate size of 1 cm (0.39 inch) in length, leave their plant by letting themselves drop to the ground or by falling off with the dry leaves. Small groups then hide in piles of leaves to hibernate. They develop to lead a solitary life and are also starting to broaden their diet by including other plants only in the subsequent spring. It has been theorized that their one-sided diet of only ash leaves occurs at their early life stage because Scarce Fritillary butterfly eggs are solely being laid onto ash tree leaves. Afterwards the caterpillars have a broad diet that includes various plants. In May – which gives them their German name "Maivogel" (Lit. May bird) – the fully grown caterpillars pupate.

== Endangerment and protection ==
The Fritillary butterfly is threatened by extinction and is one of Germany's most endangered species of butterflies. On the IUCN Red List they are marked as "critically endangered" whereas in Austria they are marked one rank below as "endangered". They are also marked in sections II and IV of the FHH guidelines (Habitats Directive; Lit. Fauna-Flora-Habitat-Guideline). The decline of the species is accounted to the loss of their habitats because of forestry, the draining of wetlands and the agricultural use of former biotopes. Another reason for their diminishing numbers are insecticides which were initially used against pine procession moths but which interfered with the shedding process of not only the moths but also scarce fritillary and many other kinds of butterflies as well.
