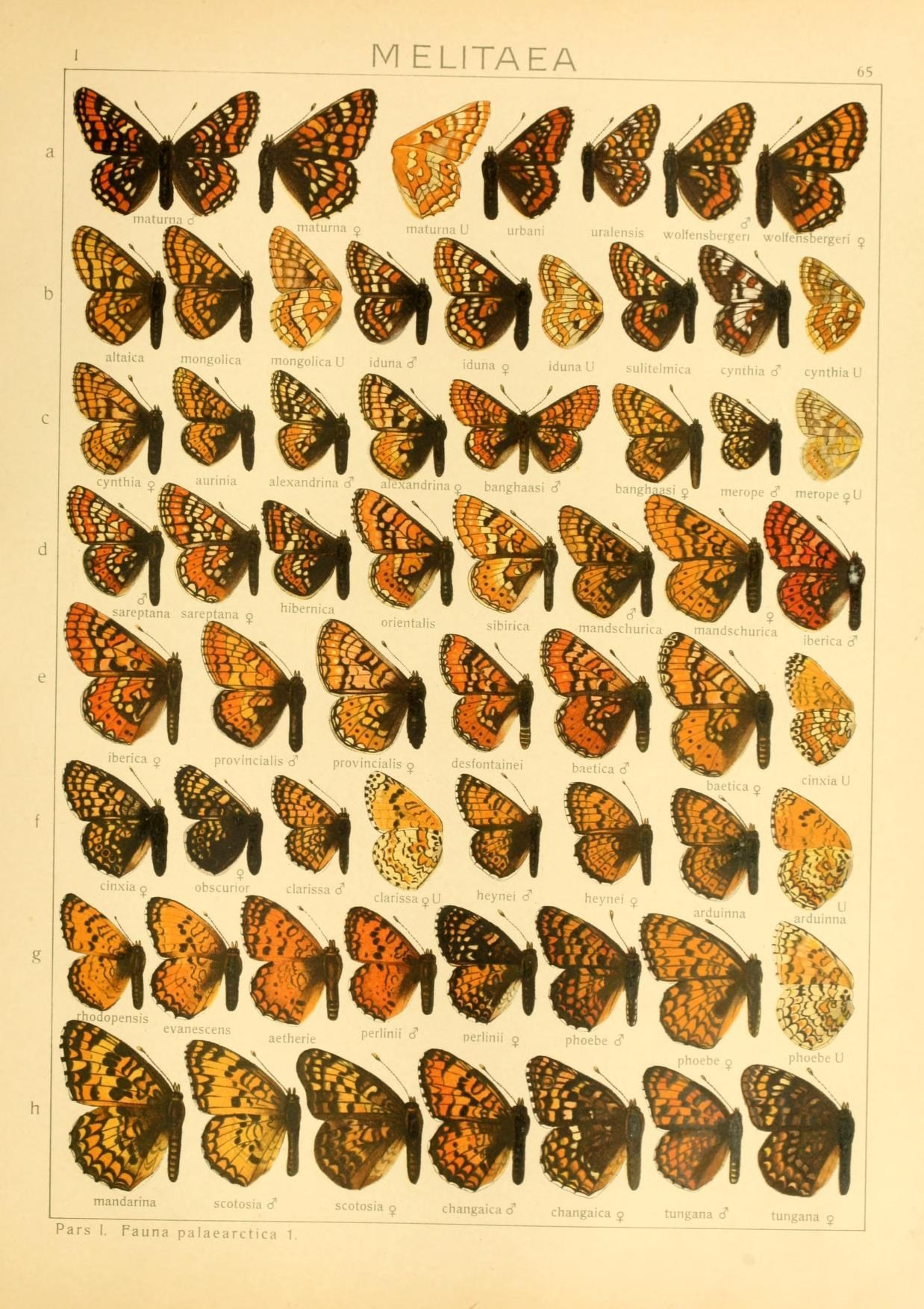
- Euphydryas intermedia wolfensbergeri (Frey, 1880) and E. i. mongolica (Staudinger, 1892) 65a, b

Scientific classification
- Kingdom: Animalia
- Phylum: Arthropoda
- Clade: Pancrustacea
- Class: Insecta
- Order: Lepidoptera
- Family: Nymphalidae
- Genus: Euphydryas
- Species: E. intermedia

Binomial name
- Euphydryas intermedia (Ménétriés, 1859)

= Euphydryas intermedia =

Species of butterfly

Euphydryas intermedia synonym ichnea (Boisduval, [1833]) is a small butterfly found in the Palearctic (Alps, Middle and South Ural, in the taiga zone and the West Siberian Lowland, South Siberia and the Russian Far East, Sakhalin, Mongolia, Northeast China, North Korea) that belongs to the brush-footed butterflies family. It occurs up to 2200 m above sea level.

== Description ==
Similar to Euphydryas maturna. The forewing length is 17–23 mm. The wing upperside ground colour varies from brick-red to light yellowish-orange. The hind wing postdiscal band contains minute black dots. The hind wing underside outer margin is fulvous.

altaica[replacement name E. intermedia altaiana (Wnukowsky, 1929)] bears a superficial resemblance to aurinia. The discal macular band, which is whitish yellow in the other forms, is here so much shaded with brown that it scarcely contrasts at all with the red-brown diffuse spots in the distal area of the wings. Beneath the entire costal and apical areas of the forewing are paler, only two black-edged cell-spots remaining deep red-brown; on the hindwing beneath the yellow marginal spots are larger and the black line dividing the yellow median band is partly vestigial, partly obsolete. From the Altai and the adjacent Central-Asiatic mountains.

In wolfensbergeri Frey (65a), from the Alps (Albula, etc.), the basal area of the upperside is darkened by black markings on both wings, otherwise the prevailing colour of the upperside, and still more on the underside, is a very dark red-brown.

ichnea Bdv. is a very brightly coloured intermedia in which the black dots in the reddish yellow submarginal band of the hindwing are especially prominent.

In the very similar but more uniformly red-brown mongolica Stgr. (65b), whose female has a very light coloured marginal band to the hindwing, these dots, though often visible, are but dull above, more distinct beneath. These last three forms, ichnea, intermedia and mongolica, are not sharply separated. They occur in Amurland, partly together, true maturna being absent.

== Biology ==
The larva feeds on Veronica, Lonicera, Thalictrum and Salicaceae. Flies from mid -June to late July.

Egg elongate-ovate, ribbed, dull white. Larva black, glossy, with thick soft black thorns, on the back a double, on the sides a simple row of small light yellow spots, between which there are small dots; until May on a great variety of plants, as Veronica, etc., but especially on bushes of, for instance, poplar, willow, ash, etc.; very often ichneumoned (Ruhl). Pupa dirty white, with dispersed minute black spots and yellow tubercles on the back. The butterflies from the end of May until July in one brood; they do not often occur in great numbers, but fly more singly and are very local, being found in meadows and on clearings in the woods; they are not silly, do not fly fast, and love to settle on young bushes of alder and juniper.

== Taxonomy ==
Synonym of Euphydryas ichnea (Boisduval, [1833])

- E. i. ichnea South Siberia, Transbaikalia, Russian Far East, Amur, Ussuri
- E. i. mongolica (Staudinger, 1892) Sayan
- E. i. altaiana (Wnukowsky, 1929) Altai
- E. i. konumensis (Matsumura, 1927) Sakhalin
- E. i. wolfensbergeri (Frey, 1880) Alps (Maritime Alps)

E. intermedia is in the subgenus Hypodryas The clade members are

- Euphydryas maturna (Linnaeus, 1758)
- Euphydryas intermedia =Euphydryas ichnea (Boisduval, 1833)
- Euphydryas cynthia (Schiffermüller, 1775)
- Euphydryas iduna (Dalman, 1816)
- Euphydryas gillettii (Barnes, 1897)

== See also ==
- List of butterflies of Europe
