= Buffalo Lake Moraine =

Coordinates: 52.496018°N 112.710727°W

The Buffalo Lake Moraine, also known as the McGregor Moraine, was left by the retreat of the Laurentide Ice Sheet, North America's last glaciation in Alberta. It is an example of a hummocky moraine. It is one of four north–south oriented hummocky moraines, in Alberta, the other three being the Duffield Moraine, the Viking Moraine and the Couteau Moraine.

The moraine varied appearance is caused by material embedded within the glacier being left in a layer, as the glacier melted. Remaining large fragments of ice, leave kettle lakes, when they finally melt. Portions of the layers of glacial till, and gravel, are eroded away, leaving a landscape of lakes and bogs, mixed with hills consisting of layers of different kinds of deposits.

Scholars once thought that this moraine marked the edge of the glaciation.
