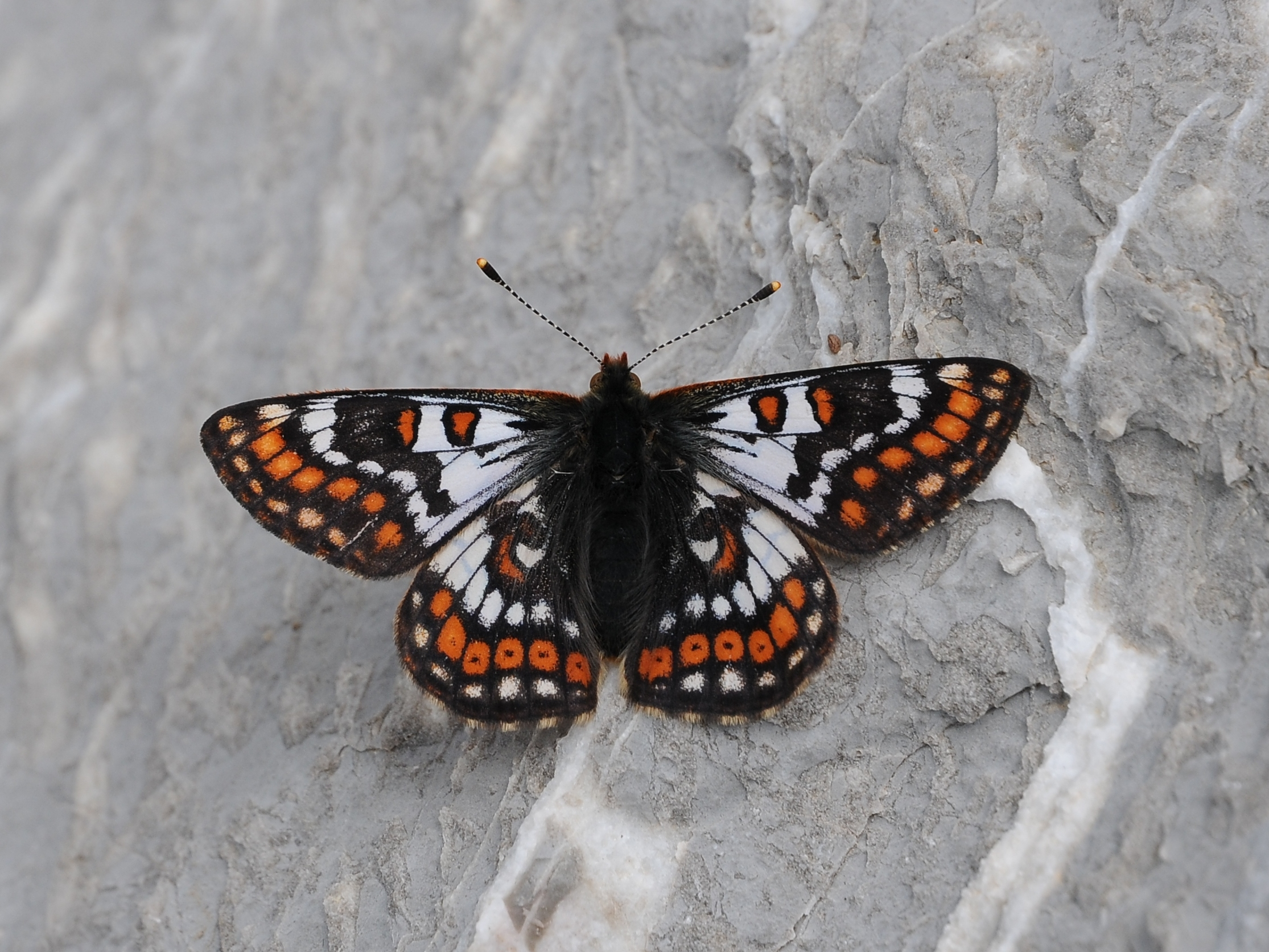

Scientific classification
- Kingdom: Animalia
- Phylum: Arthropoda
- Class: Insecta
- Order: Lepidoptera
- Family: Nymphalidae
- Genus: Euphydryas
- Species: E. cynthia

Binomial name
- Euphydryas cynthia (Denis & Schiffermüller, 1775)

Synonyms
- Papilio cynthia [Schiffermüller], 1775; Papilio mysia Hübner, 1800; Hypodryas cynthia Higgins, 1981

= Euphydryas cynthia =

Species of butterfly

Euphydryas cynthia, or Cynthia's fritillary, is a butterfly of the family Nymphalidae. It is found in the Alps and in mountainous areas of Bulgaria in alpine meadows from 400 to 2,300 meters.

== Description ==
The wingspan is 32–42 mm. It has an orange and brown checkered upperside pattern separated by the veins and organized in lines. Euphydryas cynthia is sexually dimorphic: the male has white checkerboards in the basal and discal areas of the wing whereas the female is all checkered orange. The reverse is orange with light checkerboards, anterior and posterior in the male, only towards the posterior in the female whose anterior area is checkered more or less dark. On the upperside and the underside of the female the orange checkers of the postdiscal band are centered by a black dot.

The form Euphydryas cynthia alpicola is small and presents a black suffusion on the front, the forms Euphydryas cynthia drenovskii and Euphydryas cynthia leonardi, are larger and more colourful.

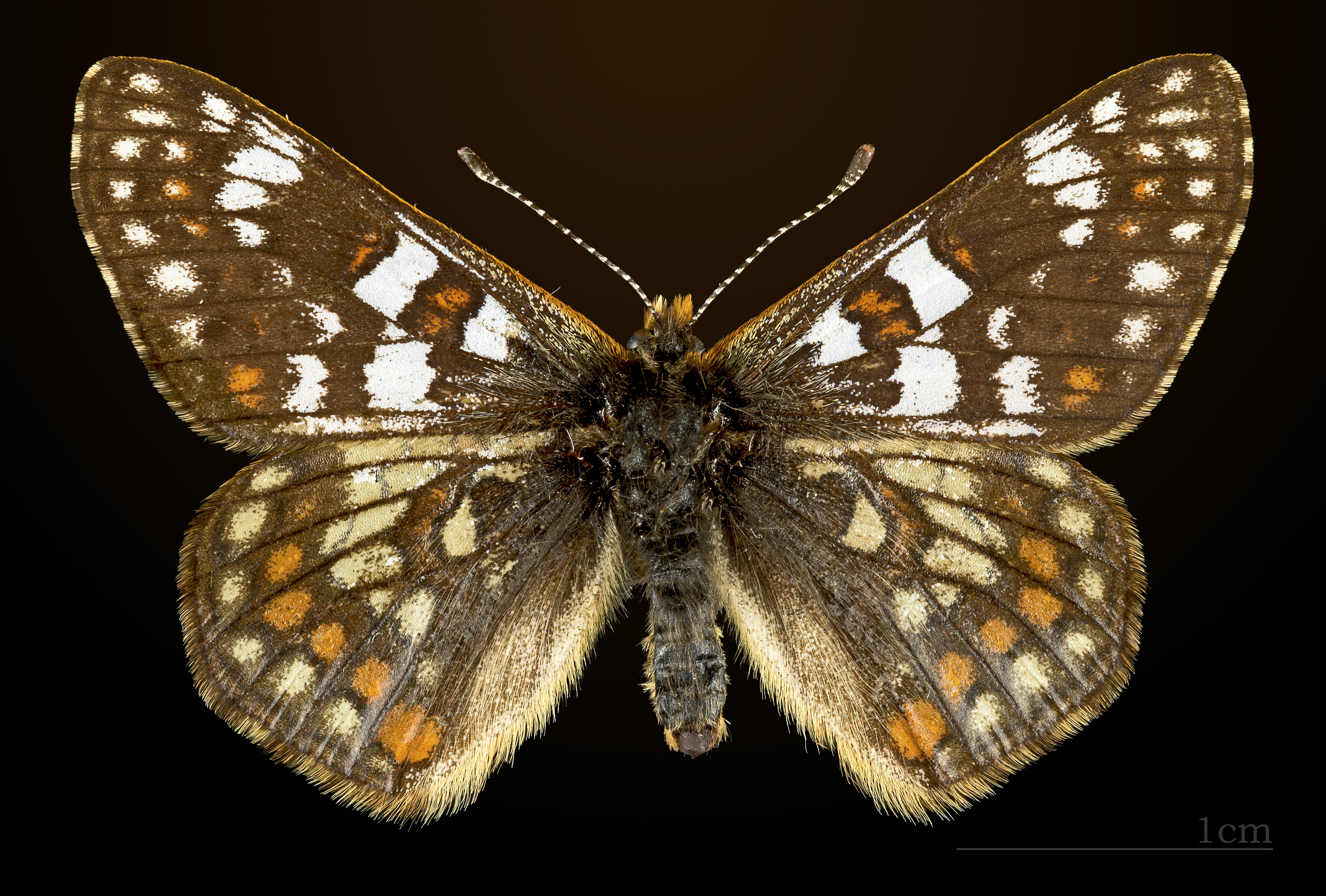
Male dorsal view

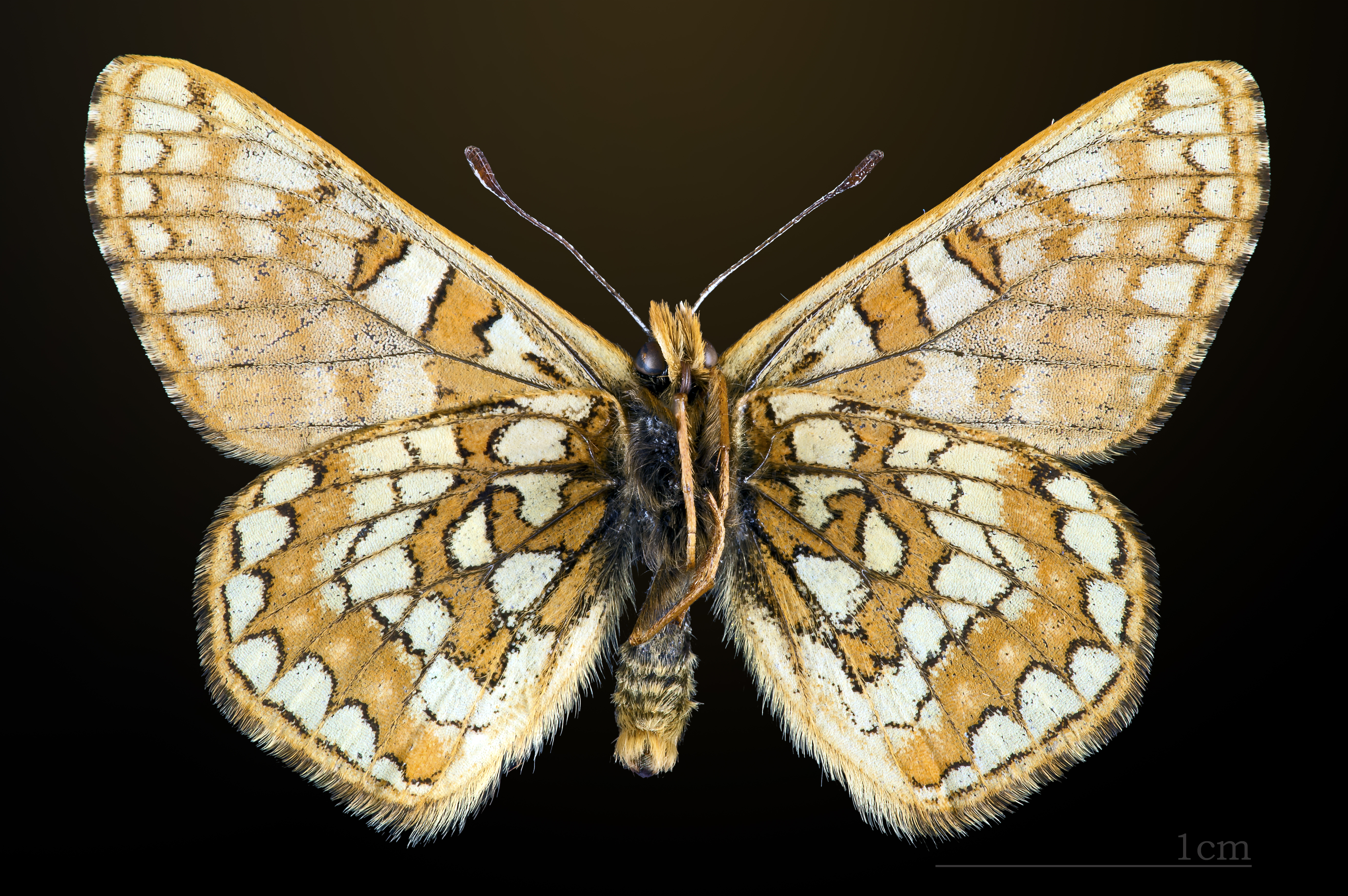
Male underside

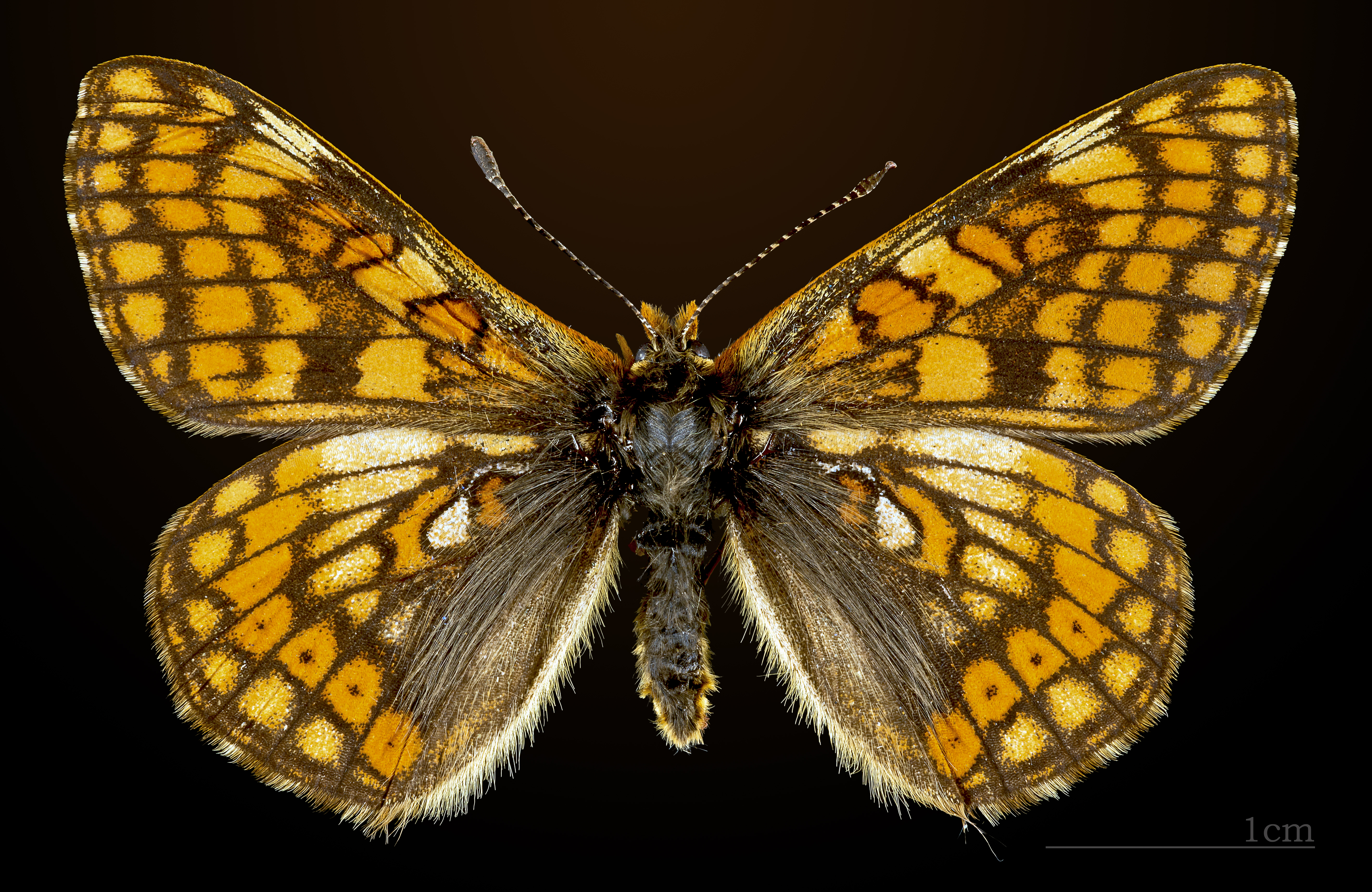
Female dorsal view

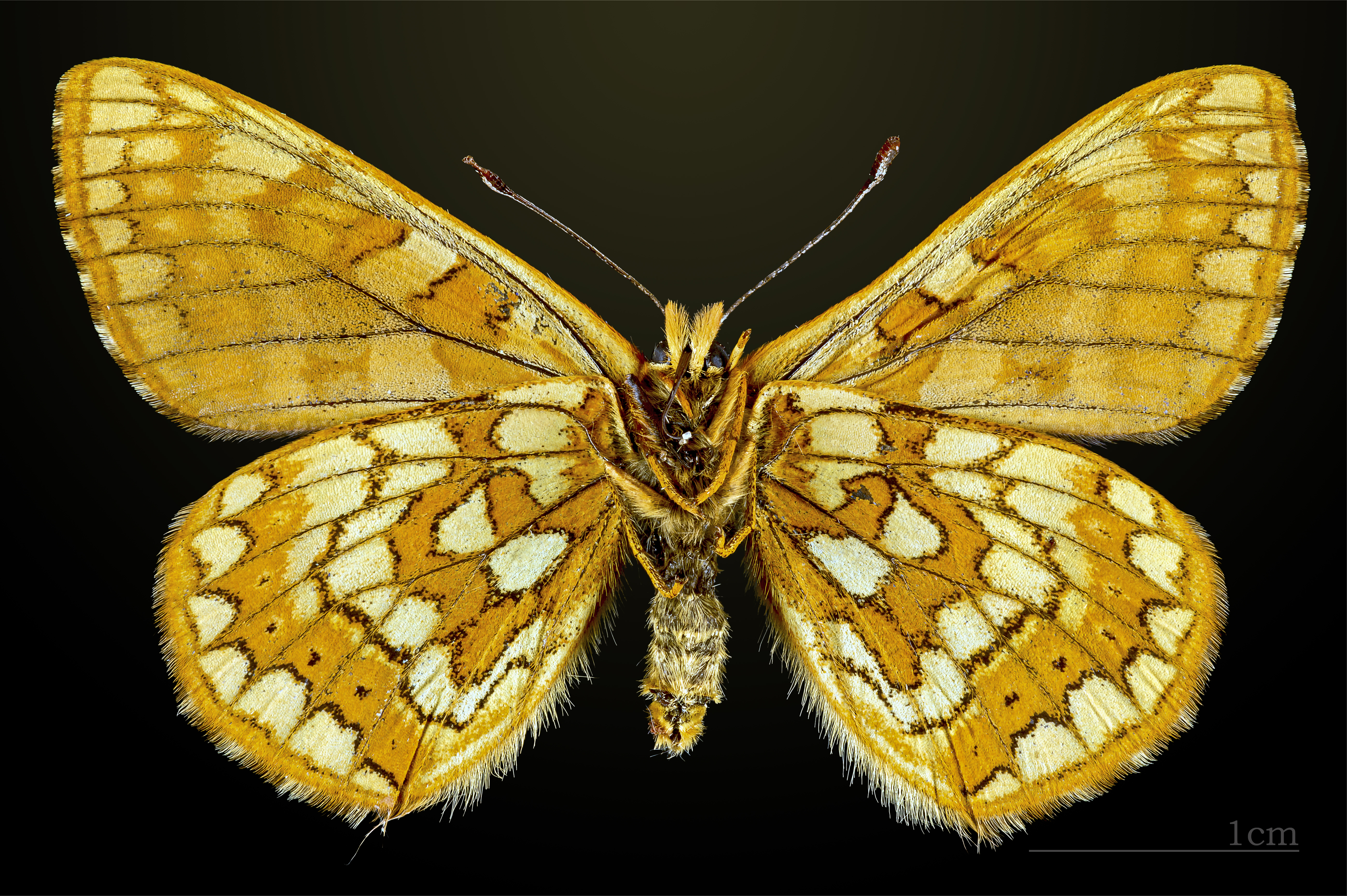
Female underside
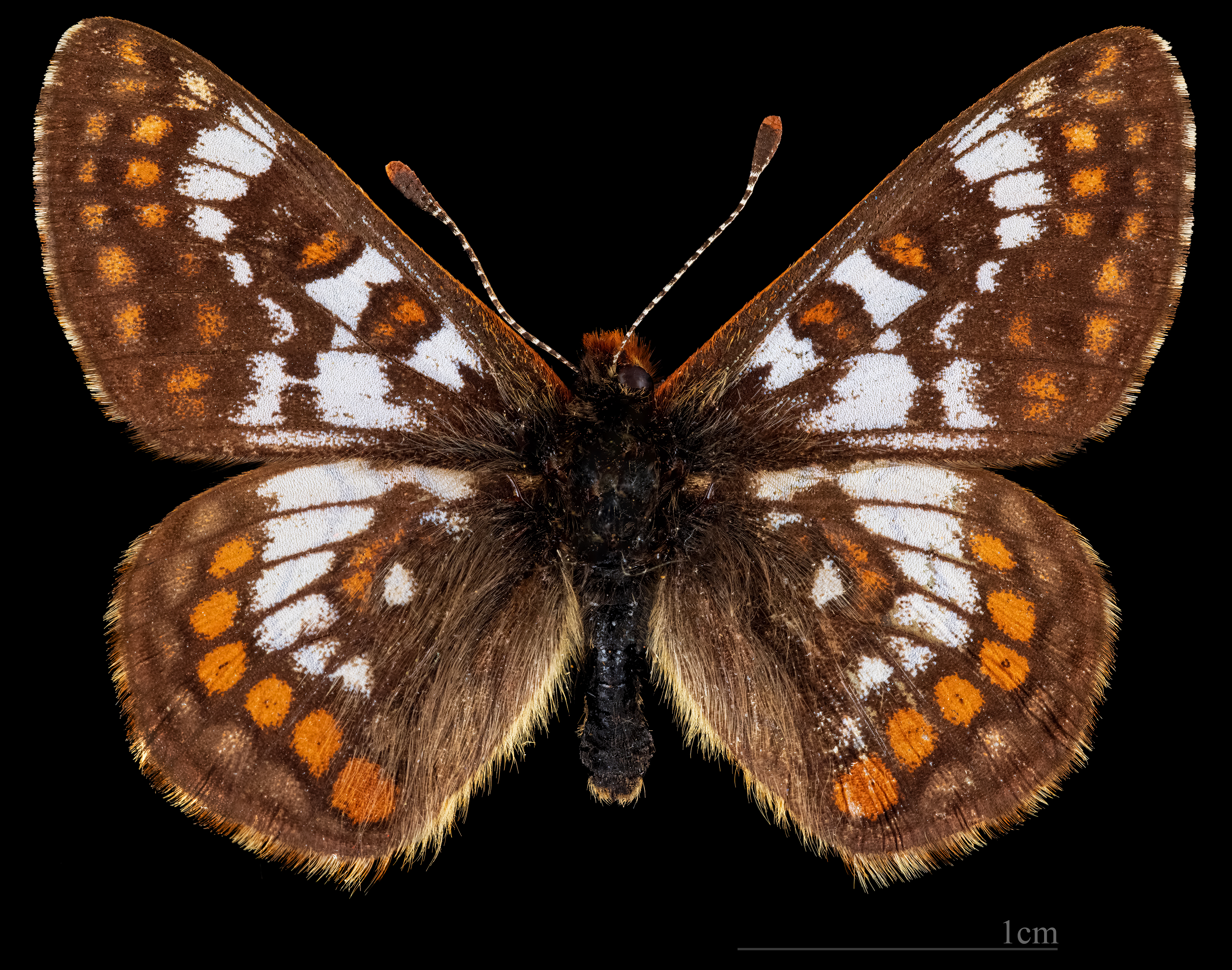
Euphydryas cynthia alpicola- Male

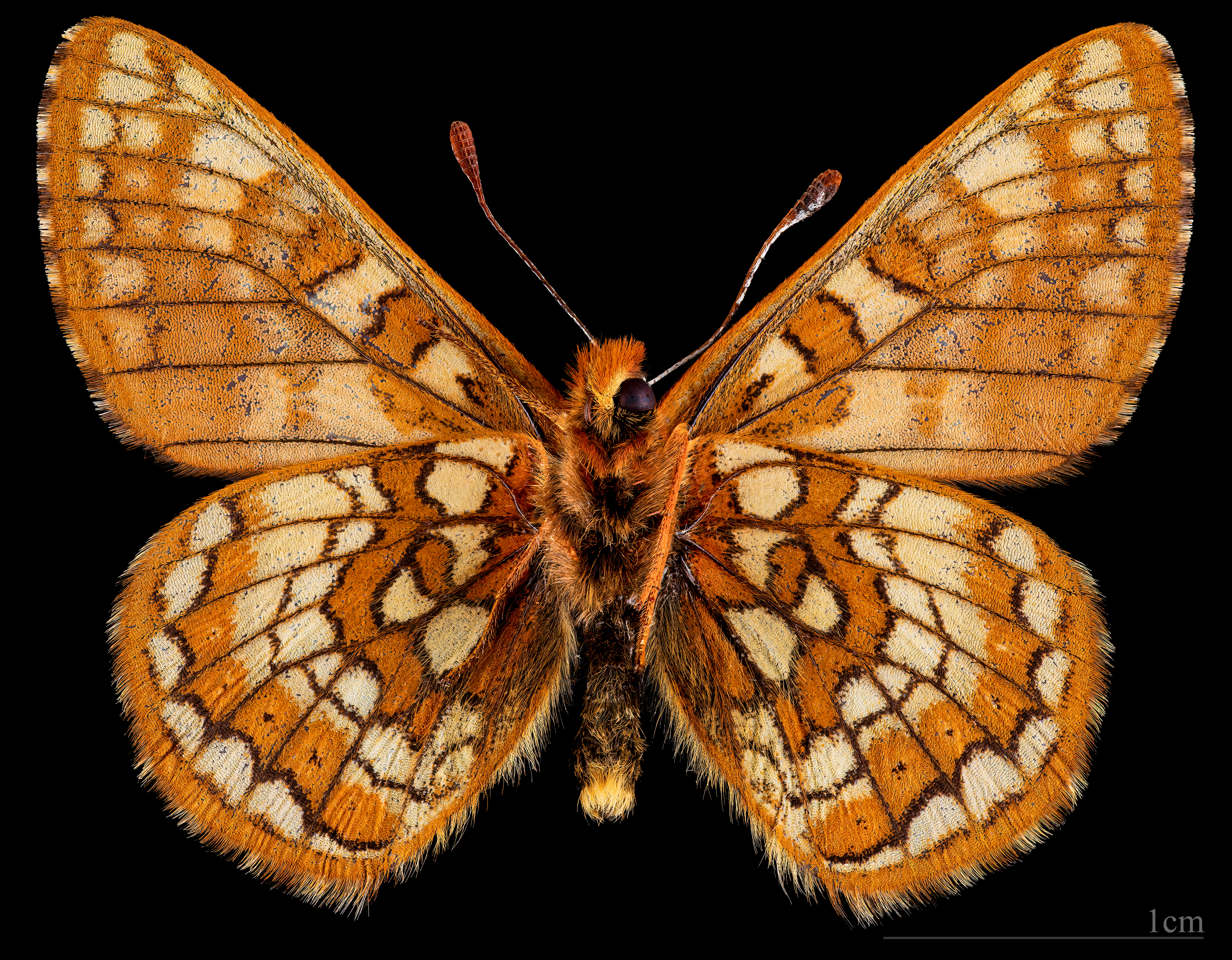
Euphydryas cynthia alpicola- Male △

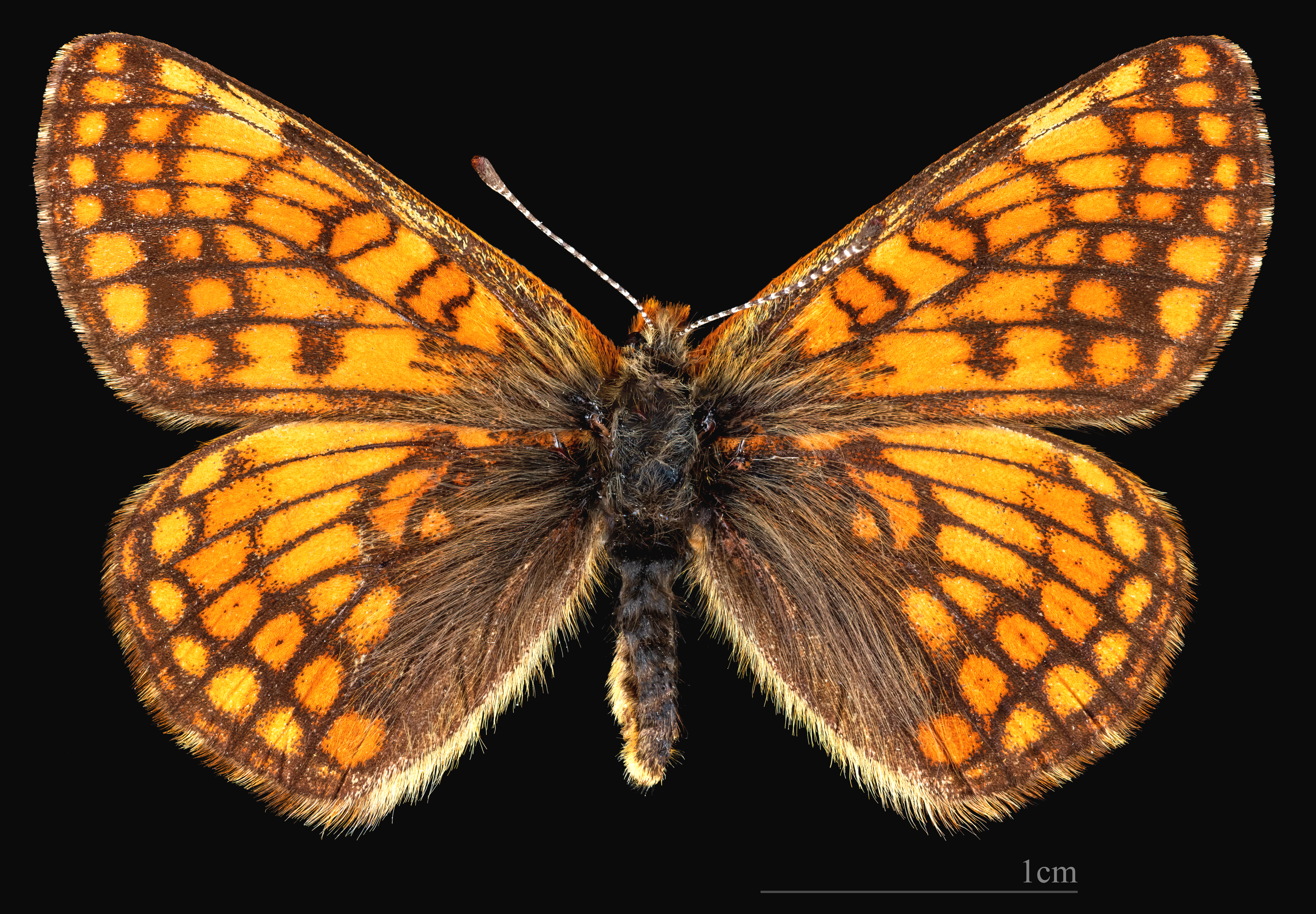
Euphydryas cynthia alpicola- Female

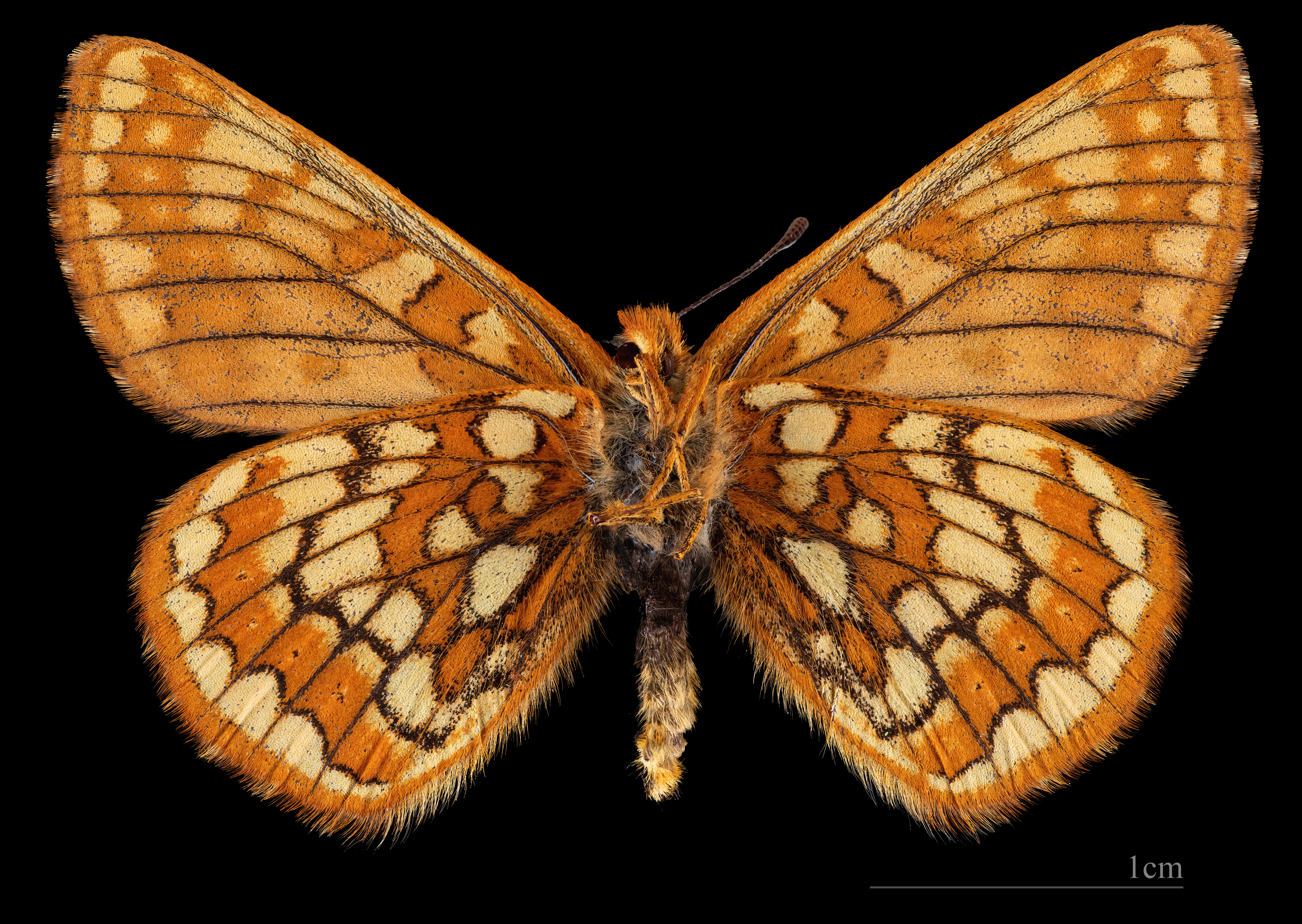
Euphydryas cynthia alpicola- Female △

== Biology ==
The larvae feed on Plantago species, including P. alpina, and Alchemilla species. Larvae and pupae also contain three iridoid glucosides: aucubin, catalpa, and 6-O-glucopyranosylaucubin. Small amounts of these molecules have been found to make the larvae unpalatable to insect-eating predators—which may contribute to survival. It winters as a caterpillar. Development requires two seasons. It flies in a single generation from late June to early August.

== Taxonomy ==
E.cynthia is in the subgenus Hypodryas The clade members are

- Euphydryas maturna (Linnaeus, 1758)
- Euphydryas intermedia =Euphydryas ichnea (Boisduval, 1833)
- Euphydryas cynthia (Schiffermüller, 1775)
- Euphydryas iduna (Dalman, 1816)
- Euphydryas gillettii (Barnes, 1897)
