= Panther River =

Coordinates: 51°39′17″N 115°19′09″W

The Panther River is a major tributary of the Red Deer River in Western Alberta. The river flows into the Red Deer River near Alberta Highway 40.
