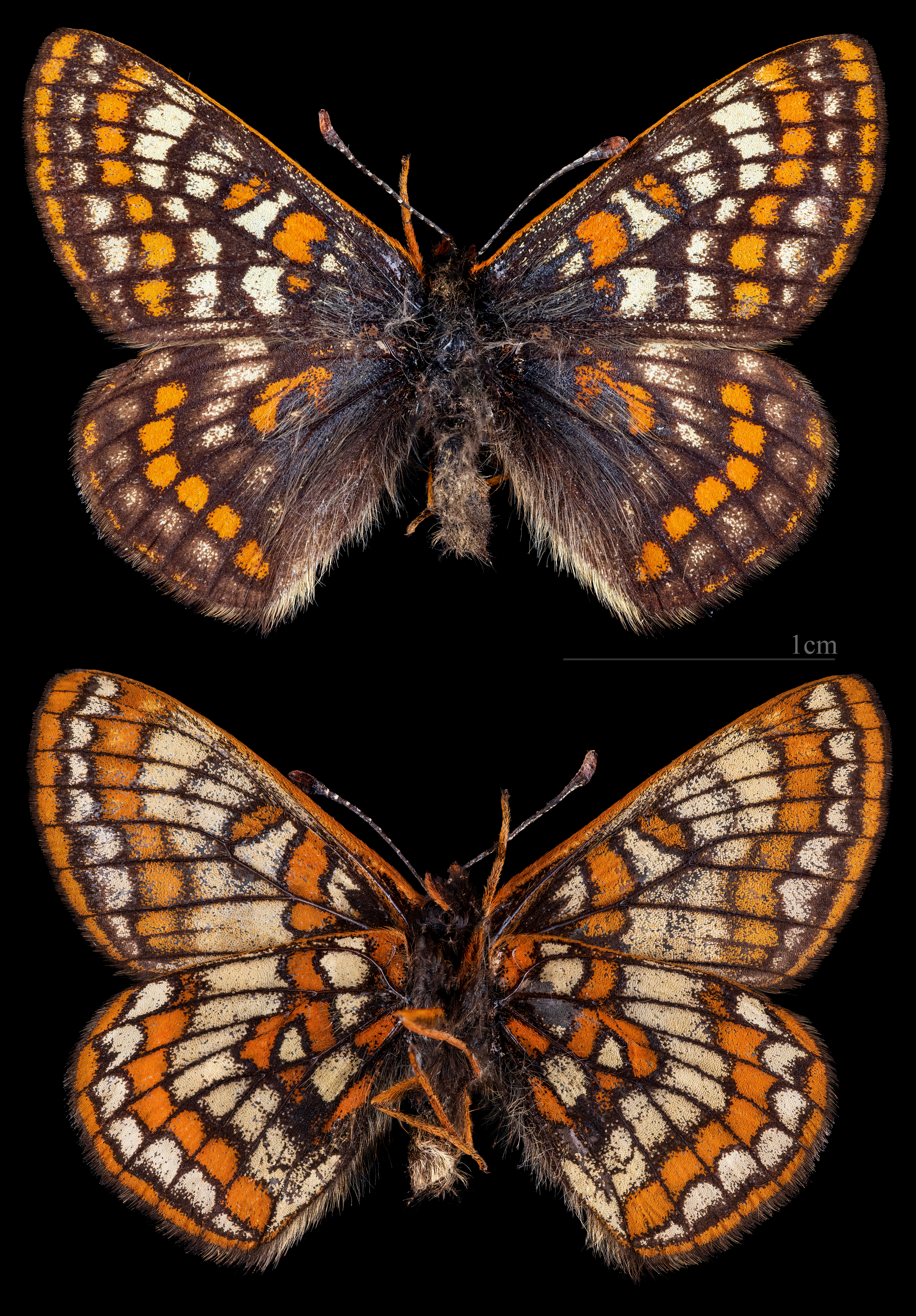
- Euphydryas iduna male

Scientific classification
- Domain: Eukaryota
- Kingdom: Animalia
- Phylum: Arthropoda
- Class: Insecta
- Order: Lepidoptera
- Family: Nymphalidae
- Genus: Euphydryas
- Species: E. iduna

Binomial name
- Euphydryas iduna (Dalman, 1816)

= Euphydryas iduna =

Species of butterfly

Euphydryas iduna is a small butterfly found in the Palearctic (Arctic Europe, Arctic Asia, Caucasus Major, Alatau, Russian Far East, Altai, Sayan) that belongs to the browns family.

== Description from Seitz ==
M. iduna Dalm. (= maturna Hbn.) (65b). This butterfly represents the preceding species Euphydryas maturna in the high north of Europe and in the mountains of Northern Asia. Male and female not essentially different. All the spots of the central area are ivory yellow above, with the exception of the cell, which contains two red-brown spots on the forewing and one on the hindwing. The underside similar to that of cynthia, but the pale yellow median and marginal bands much broader, the former moreover not being divided by a black line as is the case in maturna and cynthia. In Lapponia, Central and North-East Siberia, not rare. Specimens from the Altai differ from European ones in the stronger silvery gloss of the light markings, especially beneath. In ab. sulitelmica Schultz (65b) the light median band is narrower and the hindwing above is dusted with black. The species flies early in July in abundance on barren alpine meadows at altitudes of 6,000 to 8,000 feet (1,800 to 2,400 m) in company with aurinia and cinxia.

Second étage

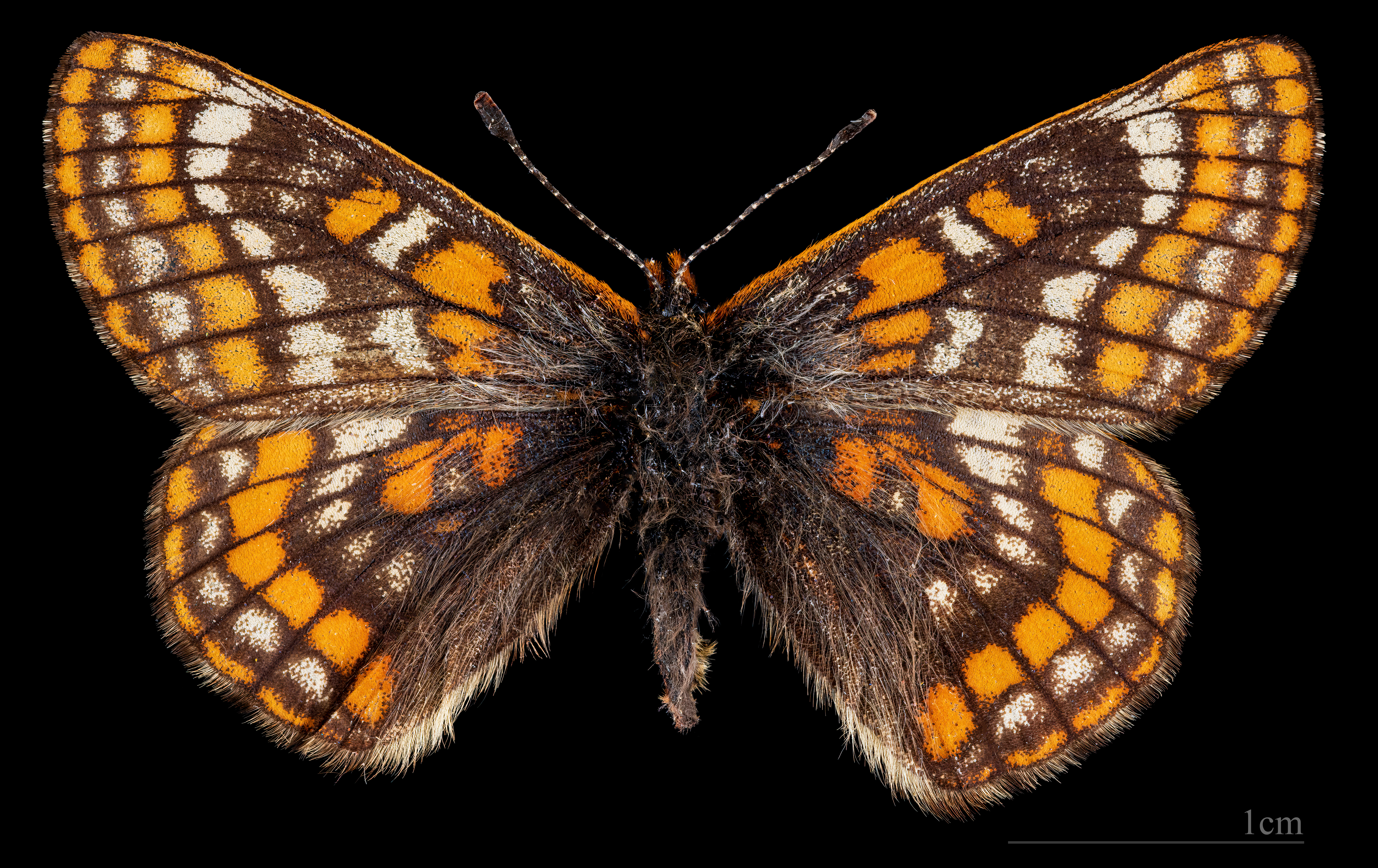
Euphydryas iduna ♀

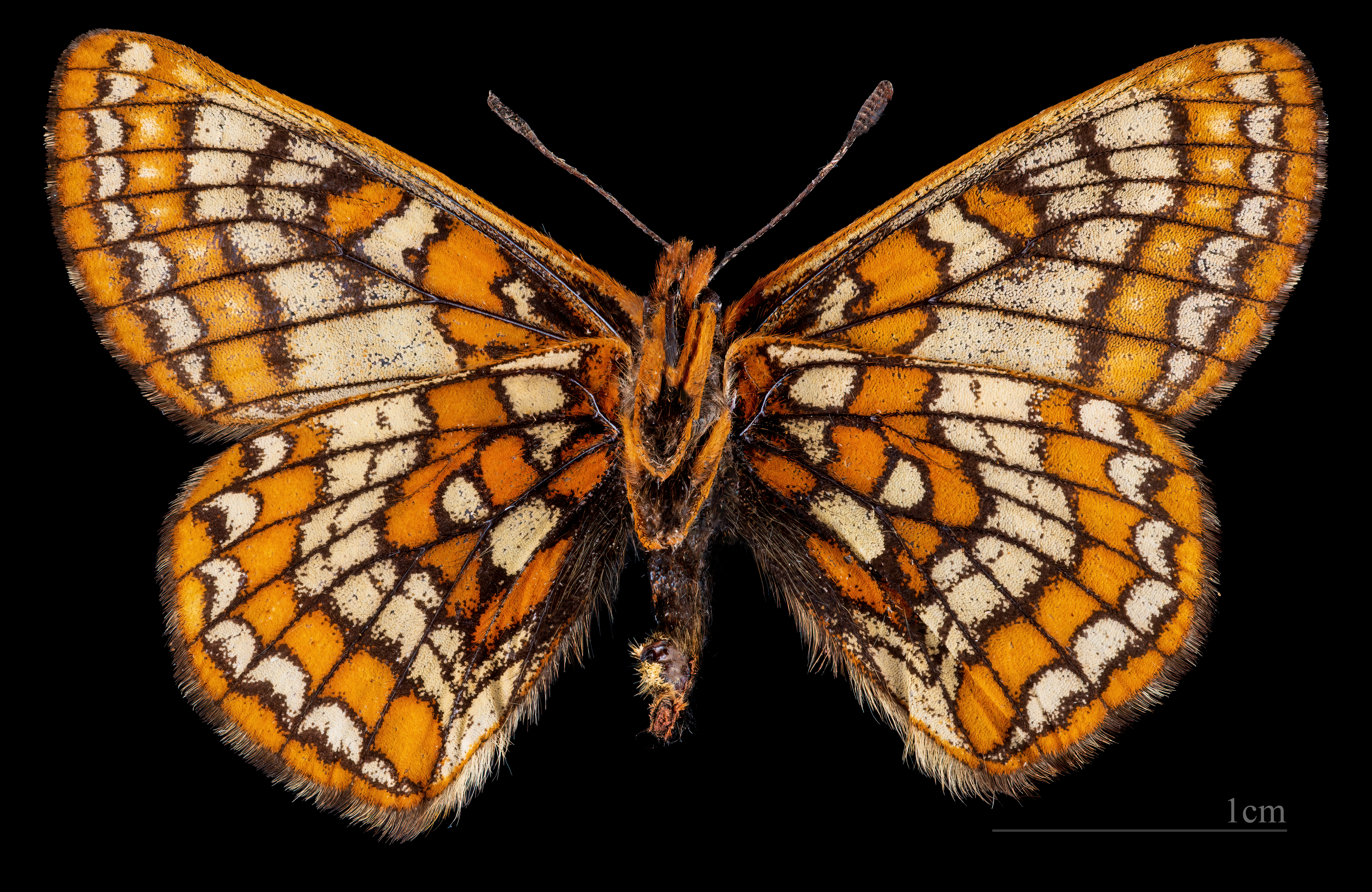
Euphydryas iduna ♀ △

== Biology ==
The larva feeds on Arctic and montane species of Plantago, Veronica, Vaccinium.

== Taxonomy ==
Euphydryas iduna is in the subgenus Hypodryas The clade members are

- Euphydryas maturna (Linnaeus, 1758)
- Euphydryas intermedia =Euphydryas ichnea (Boisduval, 1833)
- Euphydryas cynthia (Schiffermüller, 1775)
- Euphydryas iduna (Dalman, 1816)
- Euphydryas gillettii (Barnes, 1897)

== See also ==
- List of butterflies of Europe
