= Bullpound Creek =

Stream in Alberta, Canada

Coordinates: 51.066°N 111.971°W

Bullpound Creek is a stream in Alberta, Canada.

Bullpound Creek's name comes from the Blackfoot Indians of the area, due to a buffalo pound near its course.

== See also ==
- List of rivers of Alberta
