= Ghostpine Creek =

Watercourse in Alberta, Canada

Coordinates: 51.56683°N 112.9852°W

Ghostpine Creek is a stream in Alberta, Canada.

The creek's name originates from an Indigenous ghost legend.

== See also ==
- List of rivers of Alberta
