= Dormer River =

Stream in Alberta, Canada

Coordinates: 51.6167°N 115.4755°W

Dormer River is a stream in Alberta, Canada.

Dormer River was so named on account of ridges which rise like a dormer.

== See also ==
- List of rivers of Alberta
