= Viking Moraine =

The Viking Moraine is one of four large moraines in Alberta, Canada. The moraine "contains pre-glacial lacustrine and glaciofluvial sediments, diamicton and in situ Cretaceous bedrock."

The moraine runs generally north–south, until it turns east–west at approximately 52 degrees north.
