= Bearberry Creek =

Stream in Alberta, Canada

Coordinates: 51.8001°N 114.65202°W

Bearberry Creek is a stream in Alberta, Canada.

The stream's name comes from the Cree Indians of the area, who harvested bearberries near its banks.

== See also ==
- List of rivers of Alberta
