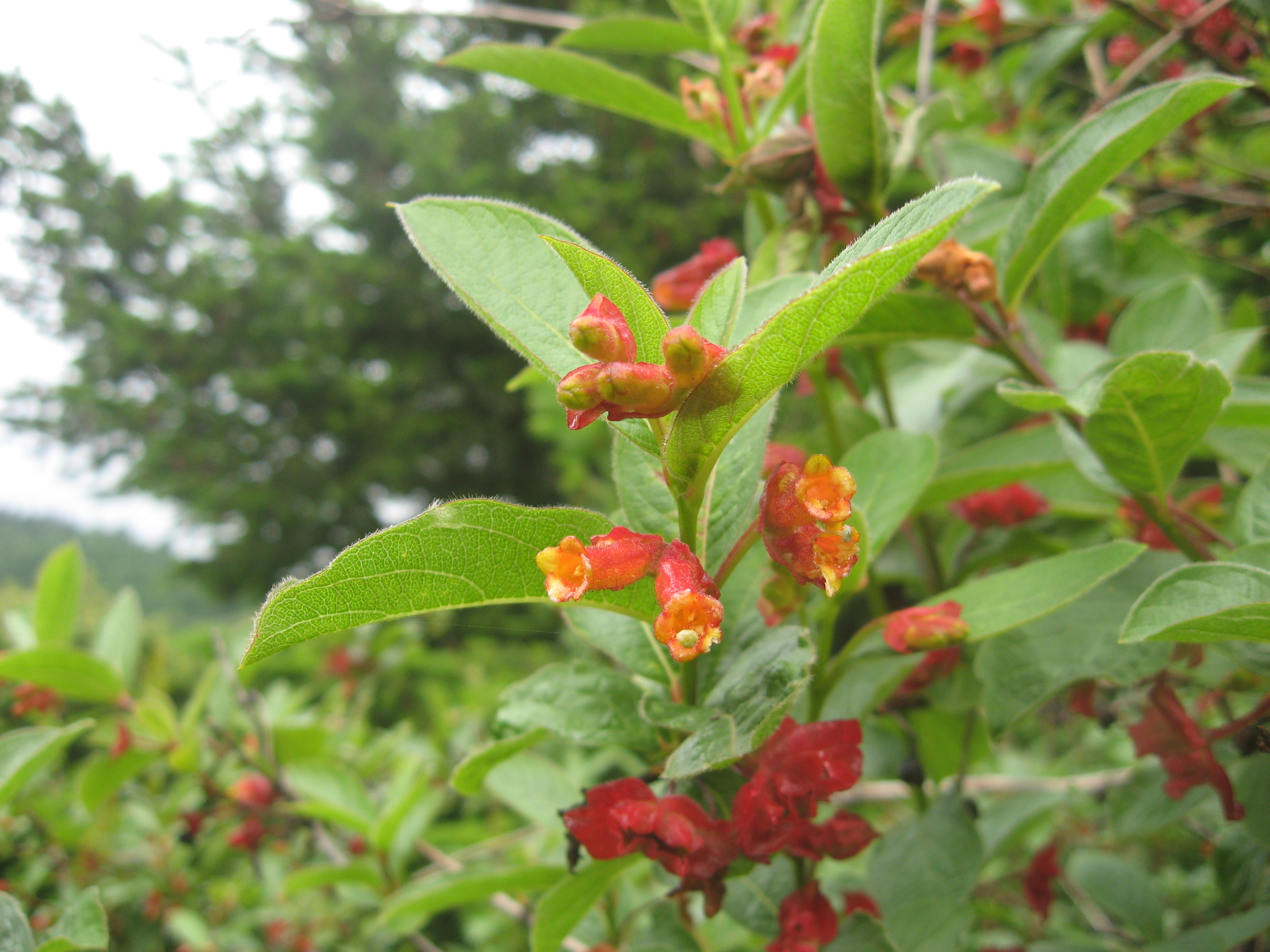
- Lonicera involucrata var. ledebourii

Conservation status
- Secure (NatureServe)

Scientific classification
- Kingdom: Plantae
- Clade: Tracheophytes
- Clade: Angiosperms
- Clade: Eudicots
- Clade: Asterids
- Order: Dipsacales
- Family: Caprifoliaceae
- Genus: Lonicera
- Species: L. involucrata

Binomial name
- Lonicera involucrata (Richardson) Banks ex Spreng.
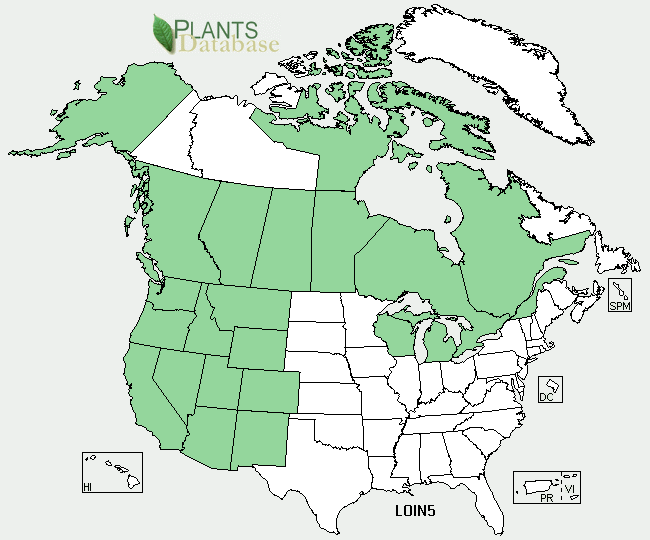
- Distribution

Synonyms
- Lonicera ledebourii Eschsch.

= Lonicera involucrata =

Species of honeysuckle

Lonicera involucrata, the bearberry honeysuckle, bracted honeysuckle, twinberry honeysuckle, Californian Honeysuckle, twin-berry, or black twinberry, is a species of honeysuckle native to northern and western North America.

== Description ==
It is a large shrub that can grow 0.5–5 metres (1 1/2–16 1/2 feet) tall, with shoots with a quadrangular cross-section.

The leaves are elliptic to oval-shaped, 3–14 centimetres (1–5 1/2 inches) long and 2–8 cm (1–3 in) broad; they are hairy along the margins and on the underside, and have a distinctive abruptly acuminate tip. They are of opposite arrangement.

The flowers are yellow, tubular, hairy, 1–2 cm long, and are monoecious; they are produced in pairs from leaf axils, subtended by a pair of reddish basal bracts 2–4 cm across.

The fruit is a black berry, 6–12 millimetres (1/4–1/2 in) wide, containing several small seeds, ripening in mid-to-late summer. It is unpalatable.

== Varieties ==
There are two varieties:

- Lonicera involucrata var. involucrata. Most of the species' range, except as below; in California only in the Sierra Nevada. Leaves thin; flowers yellow.
- Lonicera involucrata var. ledebourii (Eschsch.) Jeps. Coastal California and southern Oregon. Leaves thick, leathery; flowers tinged orange to red outside.

== Distribution and habitat ==
It is found from southern Alaska east across boreal Canada to Quebec, and south through the western United States to California, and to Chihuahua in northwestern Mexico. It grows at elevations from sea level to 2,900 m (9,500 ft).

It grows in moist, wooded areas, especially in clearings and on the edges of wetlands. Its Wetland Indicator Status is FAC+, so it is equally likely to be found in wetlands and non-wetlands.

== Ecology ==
The berries are eaten by bears, birds, and small mammals, and the flowers are an important source of nectar for hummingbirds, butterflies, and moths. The twigs and leaves are browsed by deer. However, in some parts of its range the plants are not abundant enough to be a staple food for wildlife.

== Conservation ==
While its conservation status is considered to be secure through most of its range, black twinberry is considered vulnerable in Alaska, Manitoba, and Colorado and critically imperiled in Wisconsin.

== Toxicity ==
The berries are probably inedible by, and possibly poisonous to, humans despite sometimes being reported otherwise. Pacific Northwest Coast indigenous groups referred to them as 'monster food' and 'crow berry' for this reason.

== Uses ==
It is often used as an ornamental plant. It is resistant to air pollution and can be kept in a large garden. It is commonly used in restoration applications throughout its native range, especially in riparian zones for stream bank stabilization.

Native American groups such as the Quileute, Kwakwaka’wakw, and Haida made use of the plant in various ways. The berries were used to make black pigment and hair dye, and the bark, berries and leaves were made into poultices and teas. The bark was used along with willow bark to weave clothing.

== Gallery ==
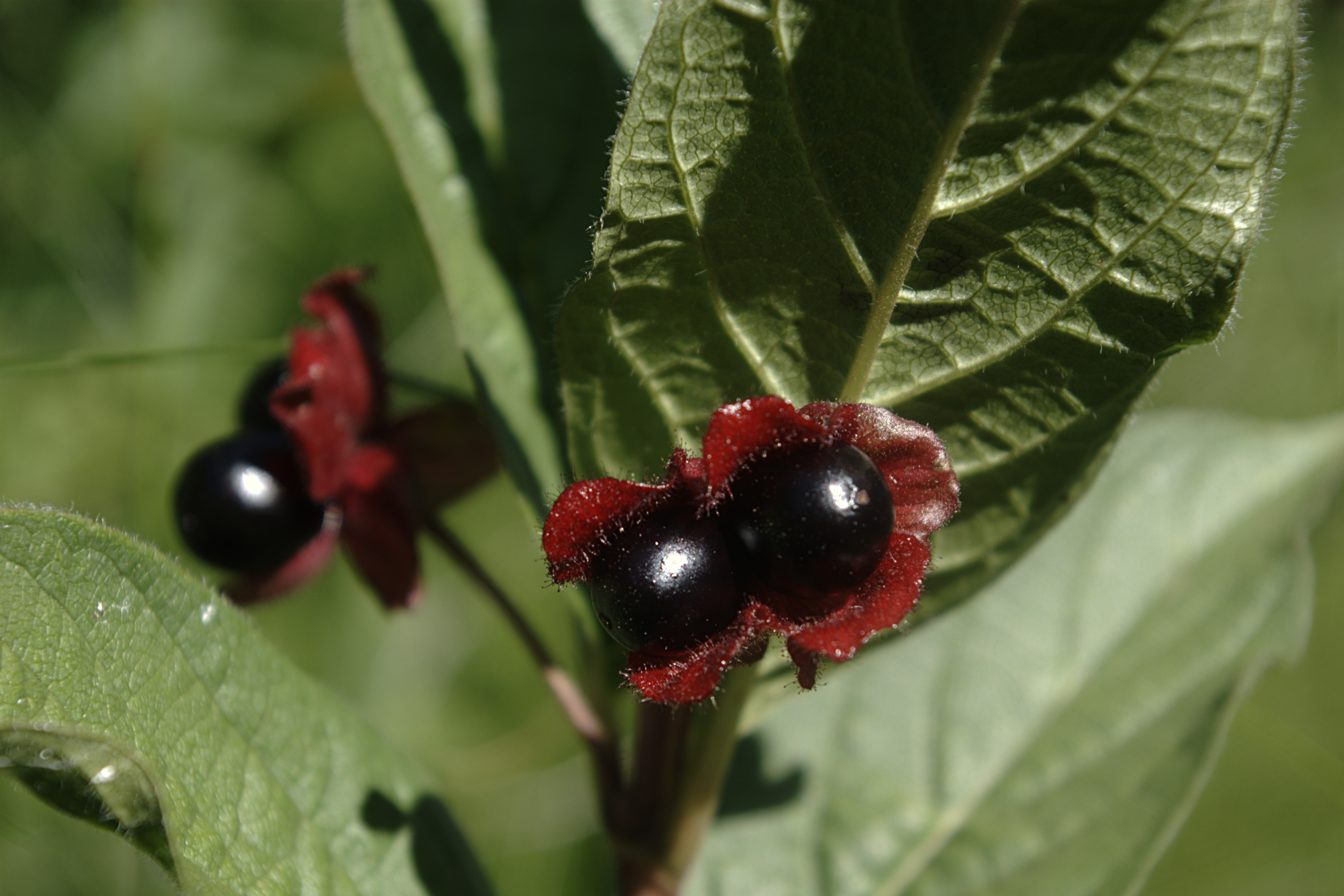
Variety involucrata in fruit

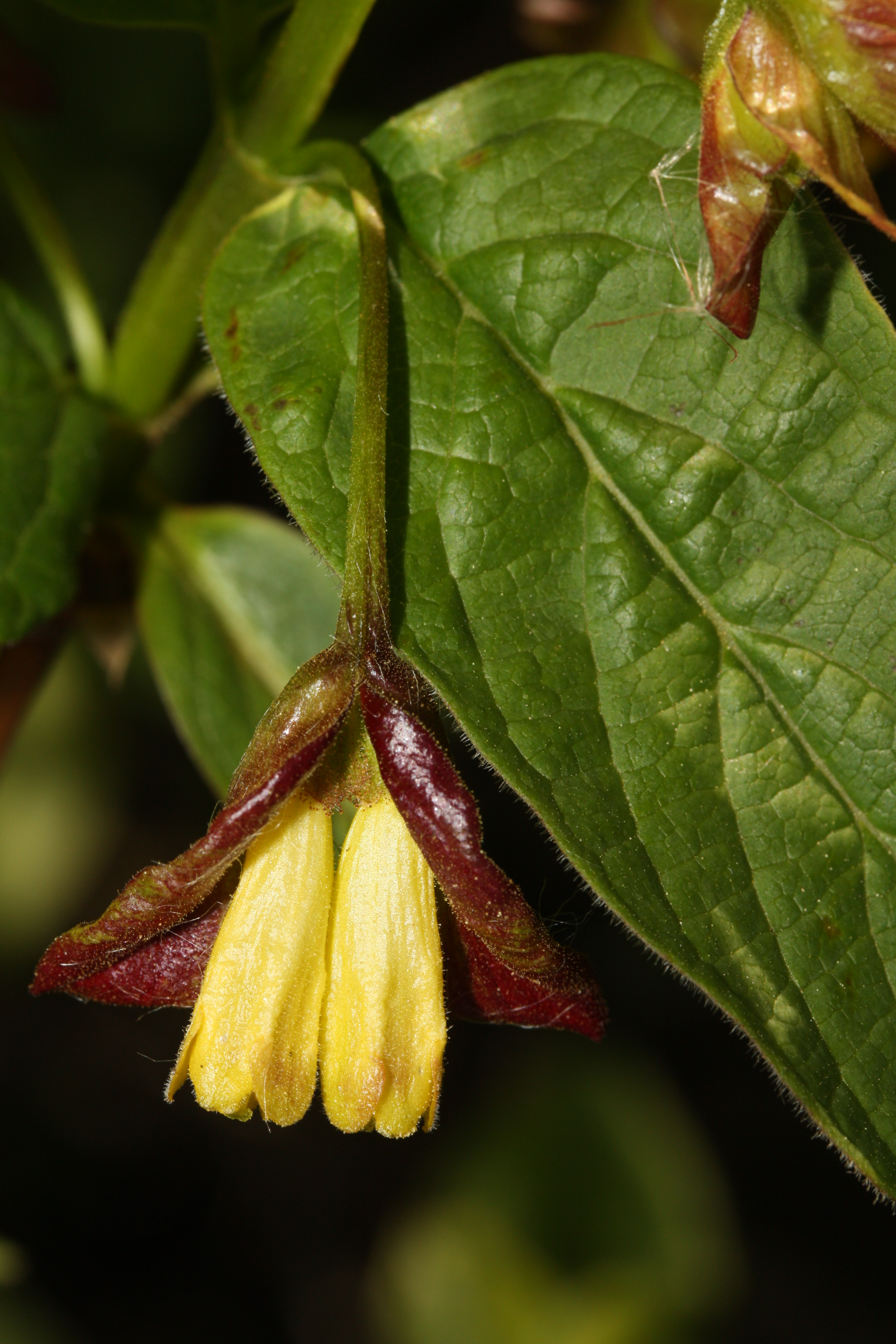
Variety involucrata

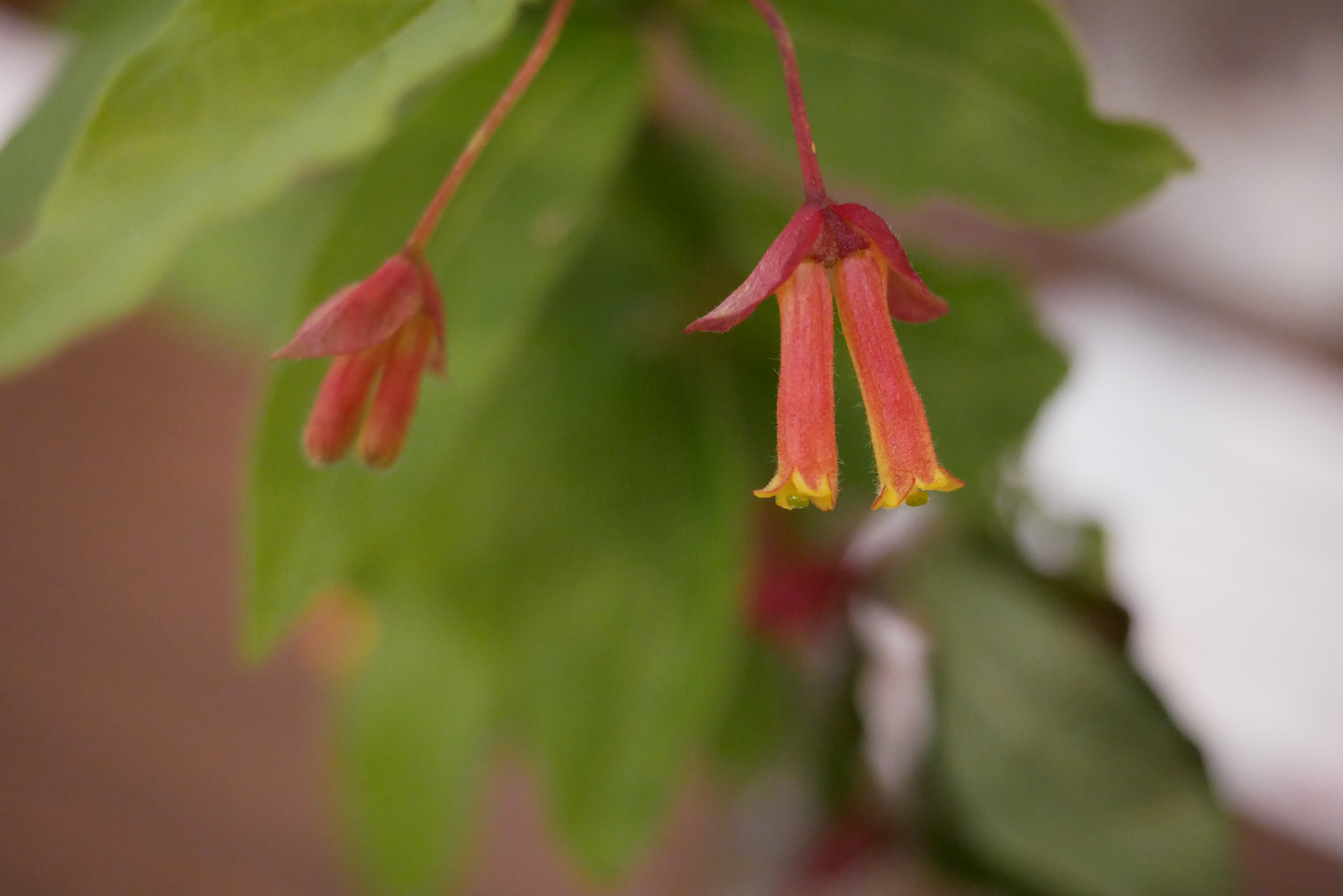
Twinberry
