= Plains of Abraham =

Battlefield park in Québec City, Canada

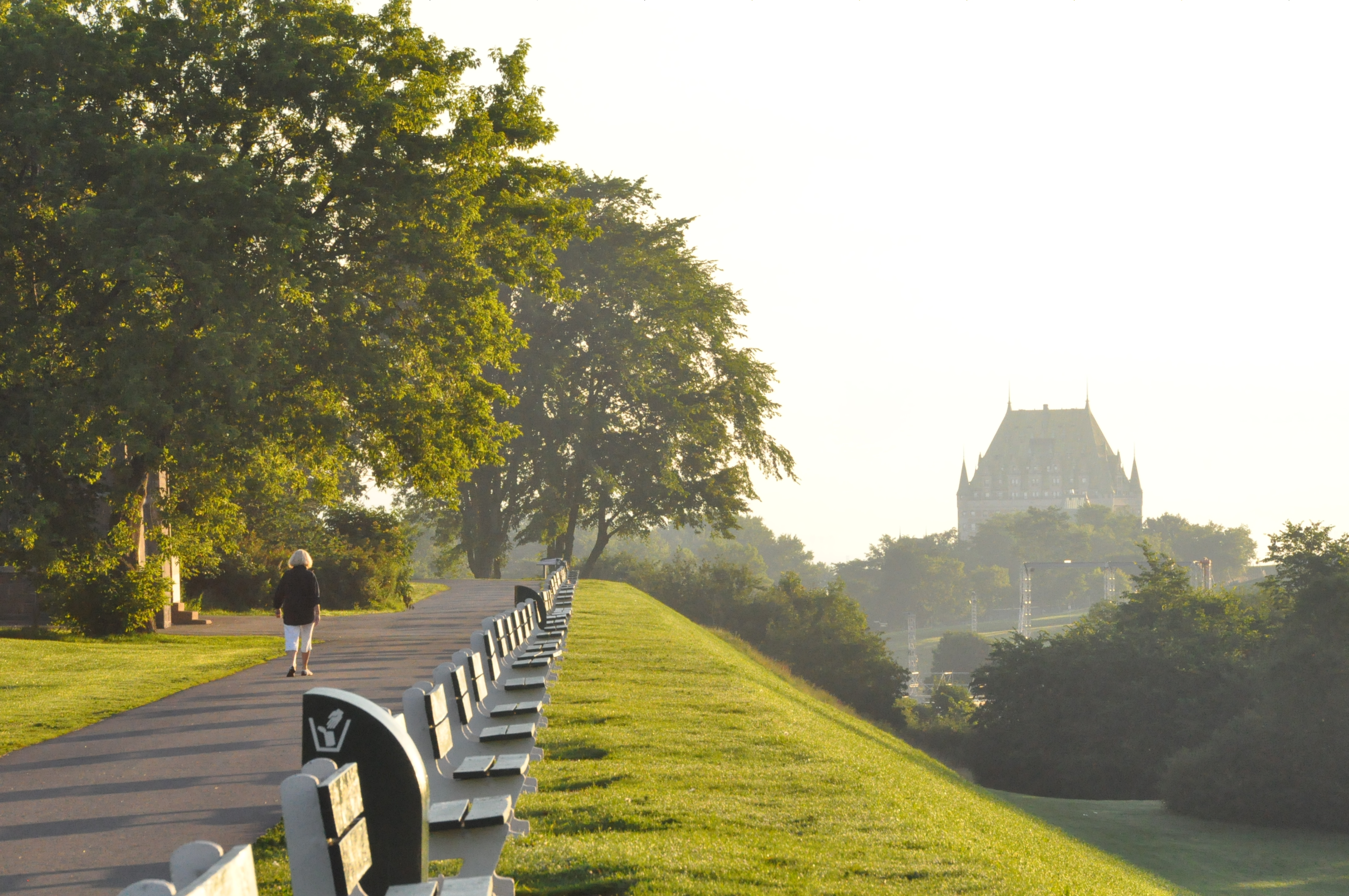
- Plains of Abraham in summer
- Interactive map of Plains of Abraham
- Location: Quebec City, Quebec, Canada
- Coordinates: 46°47′59″N 71°13′15″W
- Area: 98 ha (240 acres)
- Established: 17 March 1908
- Governing body: National Battlefields Commission (Canadian Crown)

The Plains of Abraham (French: Plaines d'Abraham) is a historic area within the Battlefields Park in Quebec City, Quebec, Canada. It was established on 17 March 1908. The land is the site of the Battle of the Plains of Abraham, which took place on 13 September 1759, but hundreds of acres of the fields became used for grazing, housing, and minor industrial structures. Only in 1908 was the land ceded to Quebec City, though administered by the specifically created and federally-run National Battlefields Commission. The park is today used by 4 million visitors and tourists annually for sports, concerts and activities.

== Plains of Abraham Museum ==
The Plains of Abraham Museum serves as the park's information and reception centre. It features a multi-media exhibition about the siege of Quebec and the 1759 and 1760 battles of the Plains of Abraham. Other displays feature the history of the site through archaeological artifacts found in the park. Open year-round and located at 835 Wilfrid-Laurier Avenue, the museum serves as the starting point for tours and includes a gift shop.

== Name and features ==
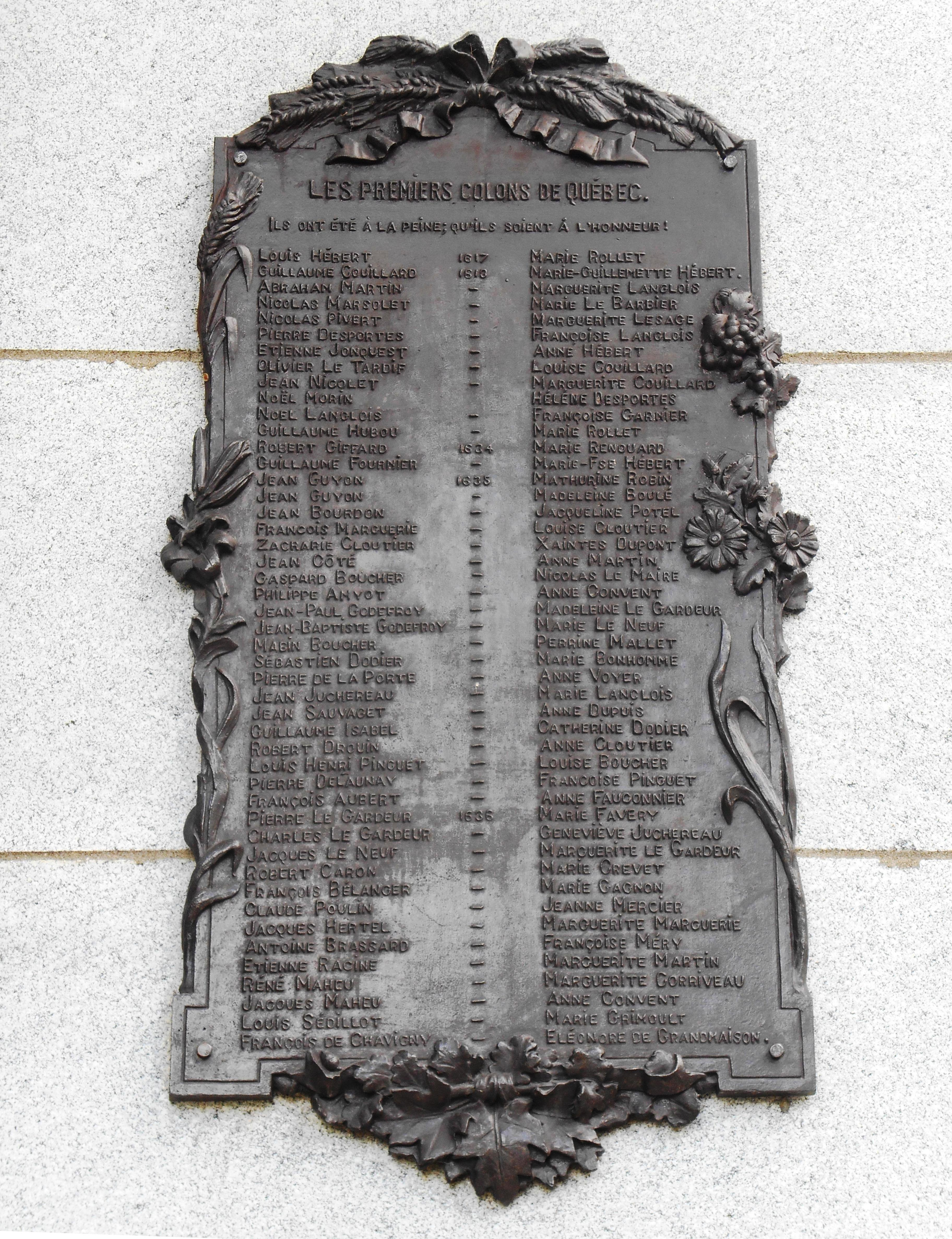
Plaque honouring the first settlers of Québec City, including Abraham Martin. (Affixed to back of monument to Guillaume Couillard, which accompanies those to Louis Hébert and Marie Rollet.) Parc Montmorency, Québec City.

The plains are likely named after Abraham Martin (also known as L'Écossais) (1589–1664), a fisherman and river pilot called The Scot. Martin moved to Quebec City in 1635 with his wife Marguerite Langlois and received 32 acres (13 ha) of land divided between the lower town and promontory from the Company of New France. Abraham's name appears in the toponymy of Quebec City at the time of the French regime, the deeds of the 17th and 18th centuries referring to the coast of Abraham, and a 1734 plan even precisely locating an Abraham Street. Later, the journals of the Chevalier de Levis and the Marquis de Montcalm referred to the Heights of Abraham, as did the diaries of British soldiers, who also employed the phrase Plains of Abraham.

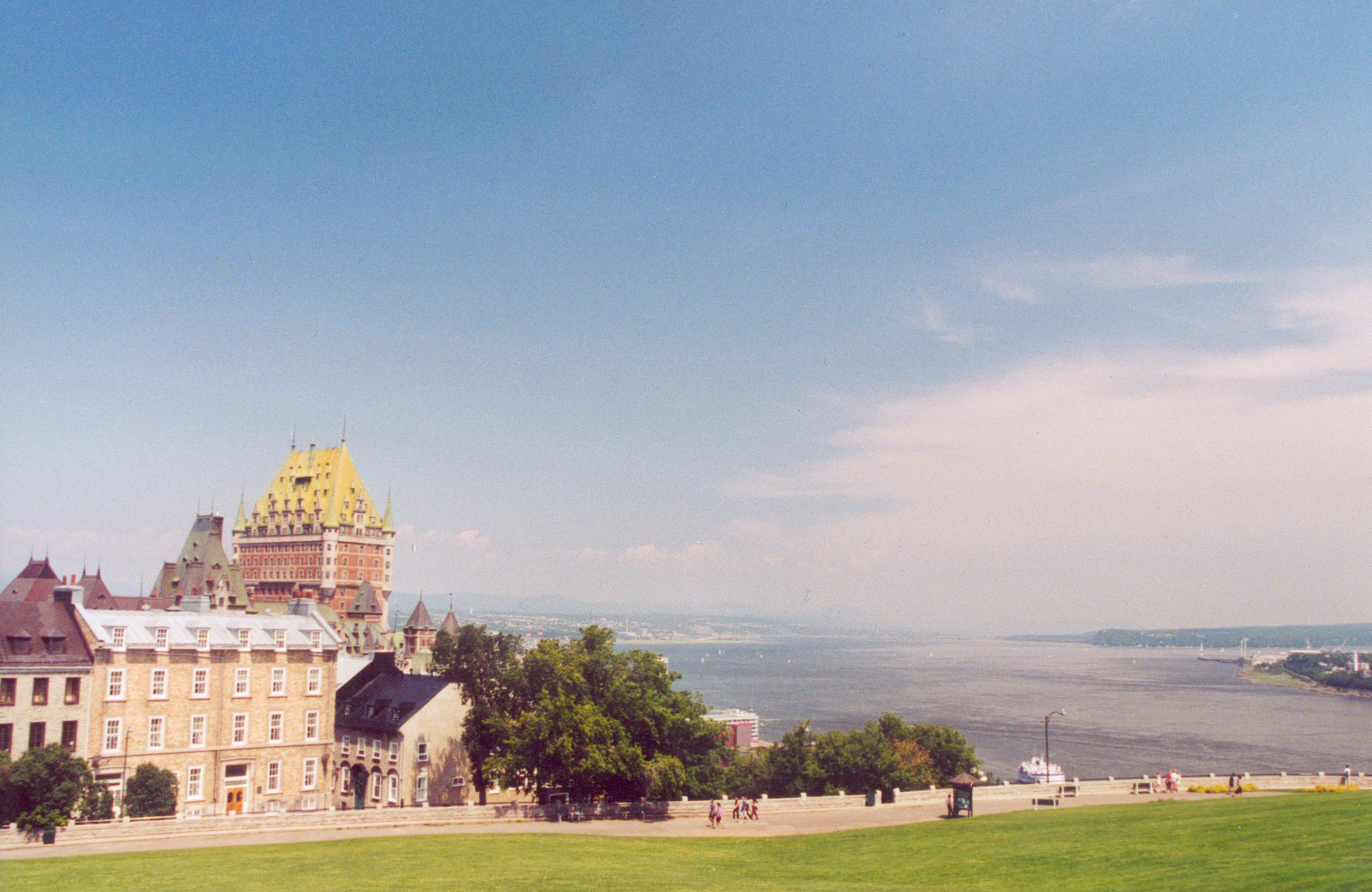
Looking toward the Château Frontenac and over the Saint Lawrence River

The park itself currently occupies an area approximately 2.4 km (1.5 mi) long by 0.8 km (0.50 mi), 98 hectares (240 acres) that extends westward from the Citadelle of Quebec and the walls of Quebec City along a plateau above the Saint Lawrence River, and forms a part of The Battlefields Park. An interpretive centre and walking trails have been built on the site, and monuments commemorate the Battle of Sainte-Foy and James Wolfe, the latter being an astronomic meridian marker raised in 1790 by the Surveyor-General of Canada, Major Holland, on the site where Wolfe was said to have died.

In 1913, the National Battlefields Commission placed a column identical to one that had been built on the site in 1849, and a replica Cross of Sacrifice was constructed on the plains to commemorate soldiers who were lost in World War I; it continues to be the location of Remembrance Day ceremonies every year.

== History ==
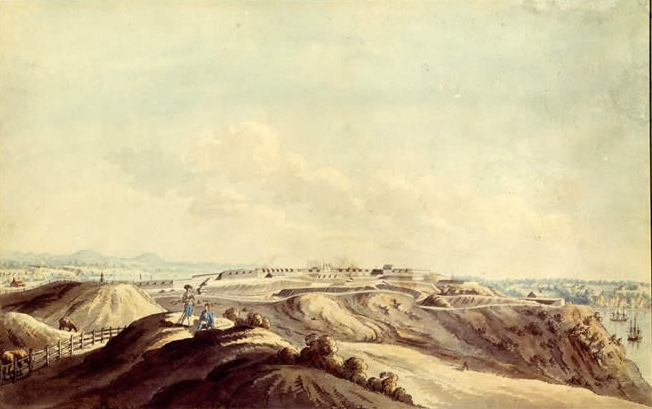
The Plains of Abraham, 1784

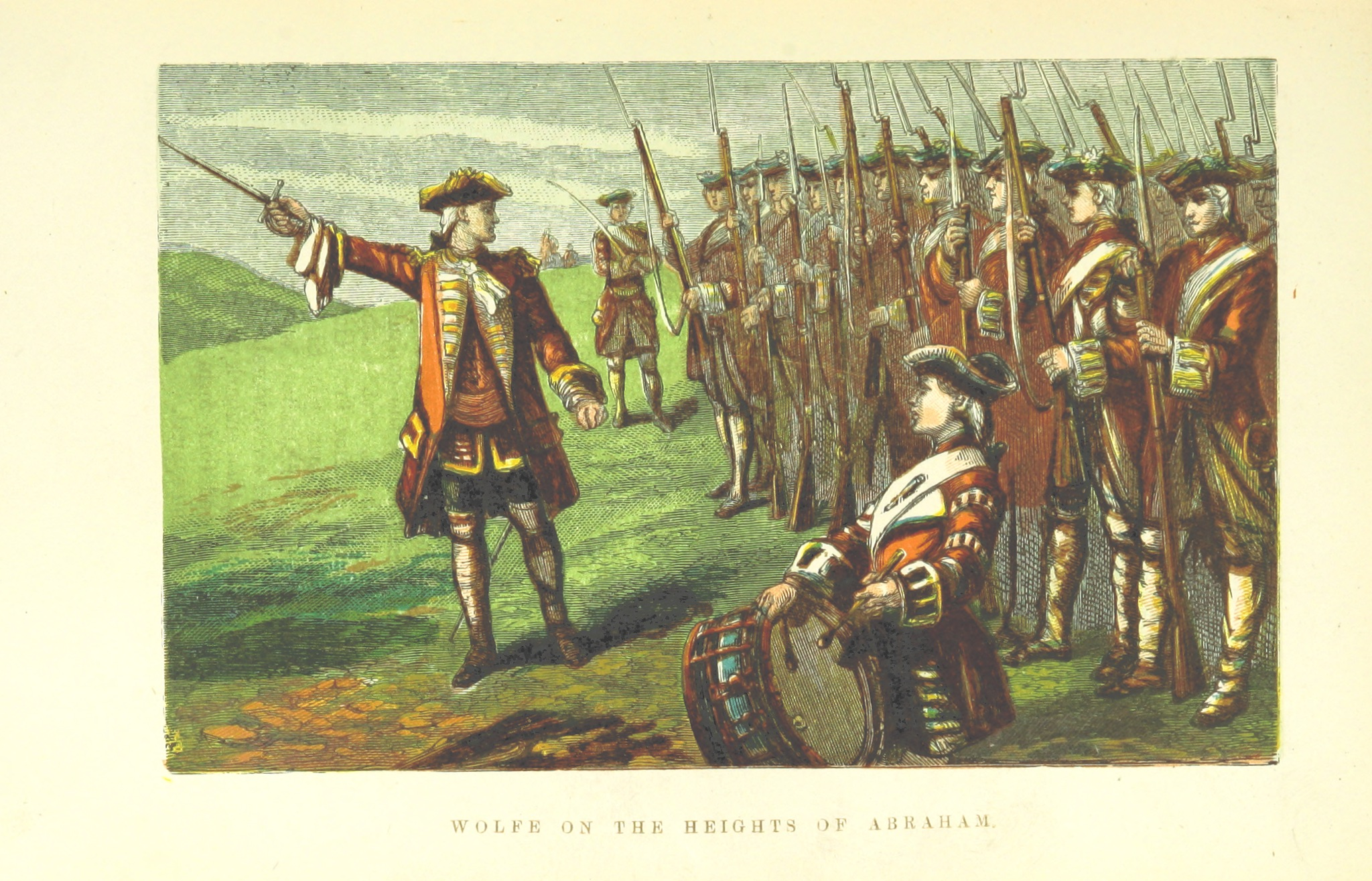
Wolfe on the Heights of Abraham (from an 1885 book)

On September 13, 1759, the area was the scene of the Battle of the Plains of Abraham, part of the French and Indian War (1754–63), which preceded, then became a theatre of, the Seven Years' War (1756–63). On that date, British soldiers under the command of General Wolfe, climbed the steep cliff under the city in darkness, surprising and defeating the French, through a single deadly volley of musket fire, causing the battle to be over within 30 minutes. Both Wolfe and the French commander, the Marquis de Montcalm, died of their wounds, but the battle left control of Quebec City to the British, eventually allowing them to take control of Canada the following year.

The plains thereafter remained nondescript fields, with only a monument to Wolfe as a reminder of the events that took place. As Quebec City grew, development of the plains took place unabated, and hundreds of acres were built over. Only in 1901 did government intervention come, when the proposed subdivision of 88 acres (36 ha) of the area was halted by the purchase of the land by the Dominion Crown. At the same time, however, another area of the plains was taken and, despite public protest, covered by a Ross rifle factory, which included a water tank built upon an existing Martello tower. A movement to preserve the site continued, nonetheless, and by 1904, the Literary and Historical Society of Quebec was permitted by the federal government to put up plaques at various significant spots around the vicinity. The following year, a proposal for the establishment of an Historic Landmarks Association was placed before the Royal Society of Canada and Governor General the Earl Grey initiated his plan to preserve the battlefields, having visited the site and stating that he "would never rest until such sacred ground became the heirloom of all Canada and the Empire."

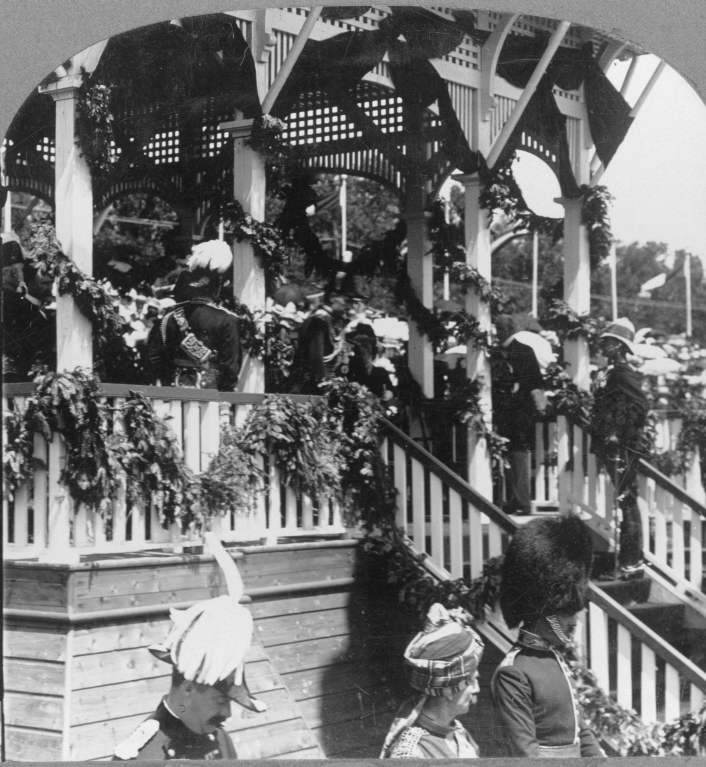
Prince George, Prince of Wales, presents the title deeds of the Plains of Abraham to Governor General the Earl Grey at the tercentenary of Quebec City in 1908

The Mayor of Quebec City, Jean-Georges Garneau, in 1908 appointed a landmark commission under the chairmanship of Chief Justice of the Quebec Superior Court François Langelier. Amongst its recommendations for permanently recording the celebrations for the 300th anniversary of the founding of Quebec City, the group called for a nationalization of the Quebec battlefields and the construction of a museum of Canadian history. The federal prime minister at the time, Wilfrid Laurier, suggested, however, that a preservation of the plains themselves would be a more fitting tribute, thus falling in line with the desires of the Earl Grey, who in January had travelled to Quebec to see whether the site could be dedicated as a part of the tercentenary celebrations. By 17 March, the park was created, becoming the first National Historic Site in Canada and was placed under the auspices of the newly and specifically formed National Battlefields Commission, a group that, following the lead of Edward VII, began to collect historical data relating to the plains and the battles that took place on them. Finally, on 24 July 1908, the King's eldest living son, Prince George, Prince of Wales (later George V), dedicated the Quebec Battlefields Park at the Plains of Abraham, then presenting the title deeds of the lands to the Governor General. The events were popular with Quebec residents, leading Laurier to opine that Quebecers were "monarchical by religion, by habit, and by the remembrance of past history." The official memorial record of the anniversary was titled The King's Book of Quebec; with the assent of the King (by then George V), the volume was published in 1911.

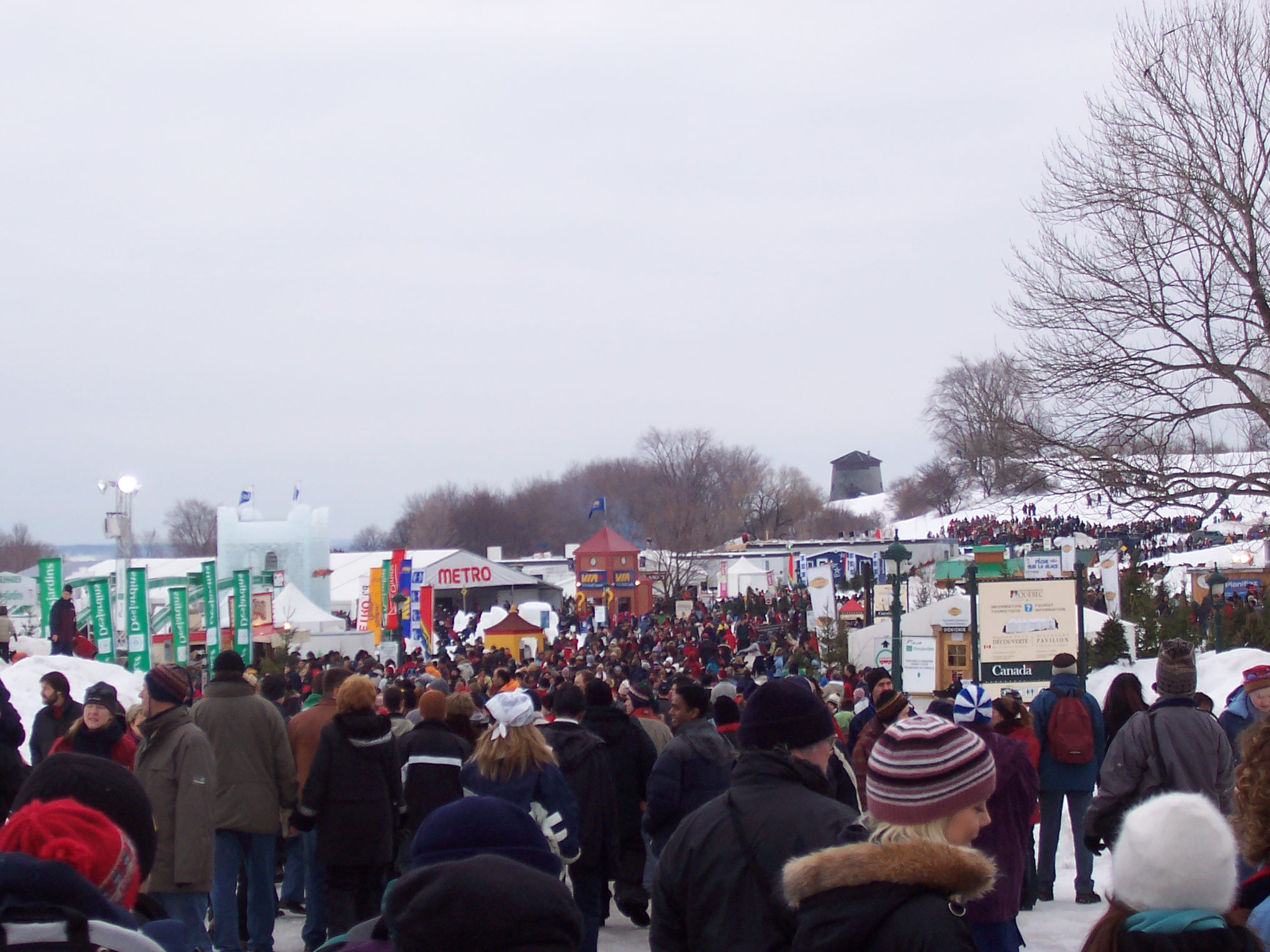
A crowd at the Place de la Famille, a Quebec Winter Carnival site on the Plains of Abraham

One final major, but less obvious, alteration to the original park happened between 1931 and 1933 when a drinking water reservoir was constructed under the park. Near every bit of soil was removed and then later replaced: "The reservoir was built between 1931 and 1933. Its base lies about two metres under the surface of the Plains, and it contains about 136 million litres of water. Situated on one of Quebec City’s highest points, it provides drinking water to the districts of Saint-Roch, Saint-Sauveur, Champlain and parts of Saint-Jean-Baptiste and Limoilou. Its vault is supported by some 900 columns and surmounted by about 20 supply grilles camouflaged by bunches of shrubs."

The site has become an urban park within Quebec City; the National Battlefields Commission has compared its use to that of Central Park in New York City and Hyde Park in London. It has thus seen various events staged on it, most regularly during the Fête nationale du Québec, the Quebec Winter Carnival, and the Quebec City Summer Festival.

== Recognition ==
On 10 September 1959, Canada Post issued Plains of Abraham, 1759–1959, designed by Ephrum Philip Weiss with a picture engraved by Yves Baril and lettering engraved by Donald J. Mitchell. The 5¢ stamps are perforated 12 and were printed by Canadian Bank Note Company.

The site is mentioned in the 1975 song "Acadian Driftwood", by The Band, as well as in the song "The Maker", by Daniel Lanois. Gordon Lightfoot mentions the site in "Nous Vivons Ensemble" (1971). Geddy Lee mentions the site in his song "My Favourite Headache" from his solo album of the same name (2000).
