= Zacharie Cloutier =

French carpenter

- Born: c. 1590; Saint-Jean de Mortagne-au-Perche, France
- Died: September 17, 1677 (aged 85 or 86); Château-Richer, New France
- Occupations: carpenter, colonist
- Spouse: Xainte Dupont
- Children: Zacharie; Jean; Xainte; Anne; Charles; Louise
- Parent(s): Denis Cloutier and Renée Brière

Signature
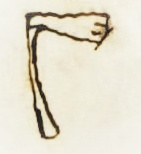

Zacharie Cloutier (c. 1590 – September 17, 1677) was a French carpenter who immigrated to New France in 1634 in the first wave of the Percheron immigration from the former province of Perche, to an area that is today part of Quebec, Canada. He settled in Beauport and founded one of the foremost families of Quebec.

== Early life ==
Many sources state that Zacharie Cloutier was born around 1590 in the parish of Saint-Jean, Mortagne-au-Perche, France. Cloutier was one of several children of Denis Cloutier and his first wife Renée Brière.

The notary Mathurin Roussel of Mortagne called Cloutier the "family peacemaker," describing how Cloutier helped his father and brother solve a dispute involving inheritance. In the parish of his birth, Cloutier wedded Xainte (aka Sainte) Dupont, on July 18, 1616. Xainte had been born around 1595 in Mortagne to Paul-Michel and Perrine Dupont, and was the widow of Michel Lermusier. He and his family were among a group of settlers who travelled from Perche, an area next to the old province of Normandy in France.

In 1619 Henri II de Montmorency purchased the New France colony from his brother-in-law Henry II of Bourbon. Included amongst the laborers hired to assist Samuel de Champlain in "inhabiting, clearing, cultivating and planting" New France were the names of Zacharie and his father Denis. This group was not a group of settlers, but a group of laborers, who would return to France once their work had been completed. Several years later, however, Cloutier returned to Canada to help establish a new settlement at Beauport.

== Life in New France ==
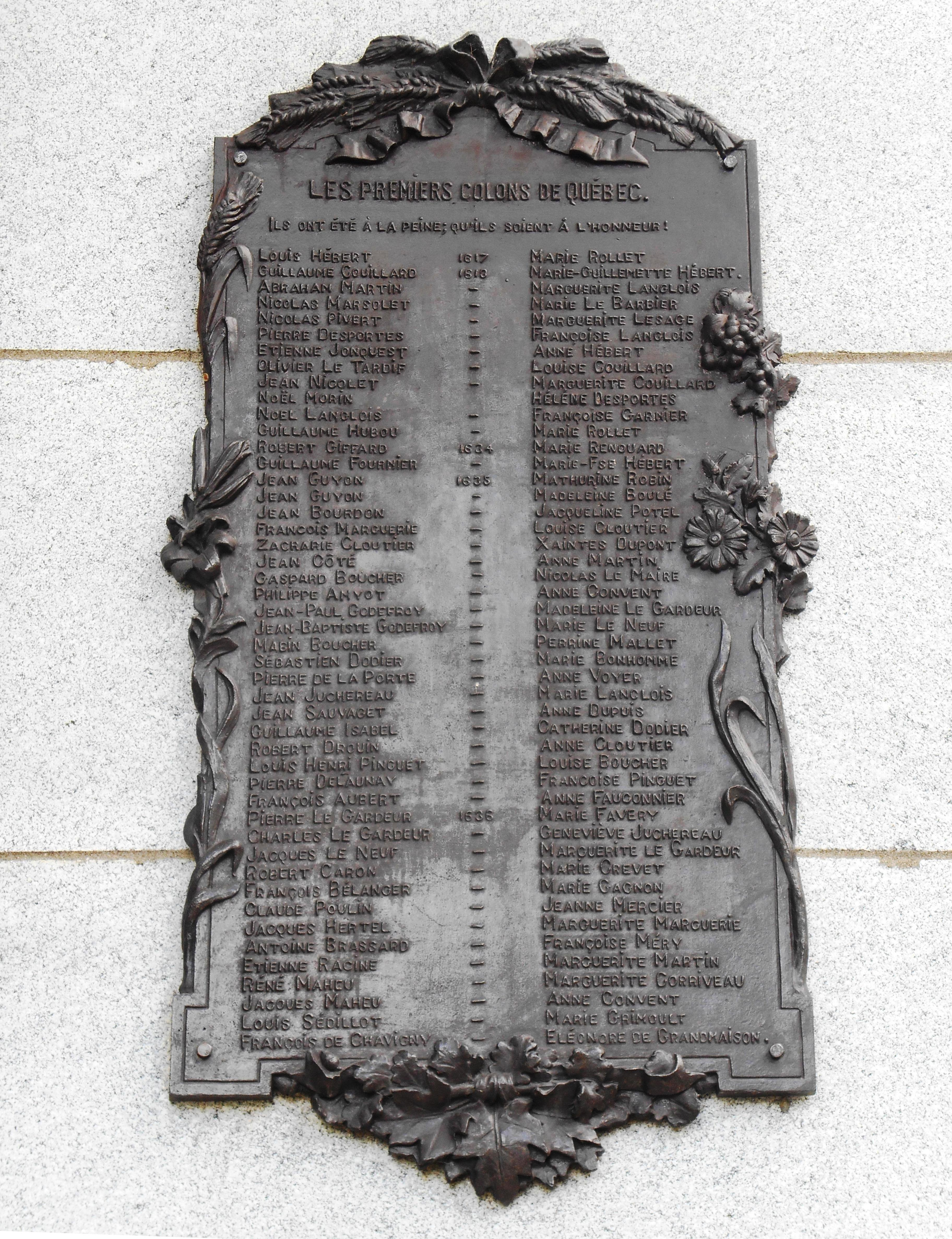
Plaque honouring the first settlers of Québec City. (Affixed to back of monument to Guillaume Couillard, which accompanies those to Louis Hébert and Marie Rollet.) Parc Montmorency, Québec City.

Cloutier was one of the first Frenchmen recruited by Robert Giffard de Moncel to expand the colony of New France by settling the Beauport area near Quebec City. Cloutier arrived in 1634 (at the age of about 44) and either arrived with or was soon followed by his family. This was an important addition to the colony's population which numbered about 100 prior to his arrival. Cloutier worked with fellow immigrant Jean Guyon du Buisson to construct Giffard's manor house (the oldest house in Canada) and other colonial buildings.

Cloutier and Guyon resisted for several years paying the fealty and homage owed to Giffard under the Seigneurial system of New France until the Governor of New France explicitly ordered them to do so. This was one of the first disputes against transplanting Old World hierarchy to the New World that would carry through the centuries even past the time of the British conquest.

In 1652 Cloutier received a grant of land from Governor Jean de Lauzon in Château-Richer, Quebec. The land on which Cloutier lived in Beauport was known as La Clouterie (or La Cloutièrerie). In 1670 Nicolas Dupont de Neuville purchased this land from Cloutier. This action resulted in disagreements between Cloutier, his neighbor, Jean Guyon, and Giffard, his seigneur, resulting in the Cloutier family's relocation to Château-Richer.

Zacharie Cloutier died on September 17, 1677 at the age of about 87. His wife died three years later on July 13, 1680, and was buried with her husband in Château-Richer.

== Children ==
Zacharie and Xainte had six children, one of whom died in childhood. The marriage of his daughter Anne to Robert Drouin is the oldest recorded marriage in Canada. In 1636, when her marriage contract was drawn, Anne was merely ten years of age. The religious sacrament of marriage was not performed until a year later on July 12, 1637. However, according to the contract drawn the year prior, the couple would only be allowed non-conjugal visits for the next two years.

Name	Birth	Death	Notes
Zacharie	August 16, 1617	February 3, 1708	Married Madeleine Emard on April 4, 1648, in La Rochelle.
Jean	May 13, 1620	October 16, 1690	Married (1) Jeanne Duval, evidently prior to 1634 in France. Married (2) Marie Martin on January 21, 1648, in Quebec.
Xainte (aka Sainte)	November 1, 1622	September 19, 1632	Died at nearly 10 yrs old in France.
Anne	January 19, 1626	February 3, 1648	Married Robert Drouin (officially) on July 12, 1637, in Quebec.
Charles	May 3, 1629	June 5, 1709	Married Louise Morin on April 20, 1659, in Quebec.
Marie-Louise	March 18, 1632	June 22, 1699	Married (1) François Marguerie on October 26, 1645, in Quebec. Married (2) Jean Migneault dit Châtillon on November 10, 1648, in Quebec. Married (3) Jean Matthieu on February 3, 1684, in Quebec.

== Notable descendants ==
Zacharie Cloutier is the common ancestor of the Cloutiers of North America, some with spelling variations. By 1800, Cloutier had 10,850 French-Canadian descendants, the most of any Quebec colonist, according to marriage records studied by the Historical Demography Research Program of the Université de Montréal.

Cloutier is a common ancestor of the following people:

- David Archambault
- Lee Archambault
- Mark Belanger
- Jehane Benoît
- Melissa Benoist
- Carolyn Bessette Kennedy
- Justin Bieber
- Marcheline Bertrand
- Joseph-Armand Bombardier
- Isabelle Boulay
- Camilla, Queen of the United Kingdom
- Jim Carrey
- Blue Ivy Carter
- John Cena
- Madonna Ciccone
- Hillary Clinton
- Albert Edward Cloutier
- Alexandre Cloutier
- Dan Cloutier
- François Cloutier
- Gary Cloutier
- Gilles Cloutier
- Guy Cloutier
- Guylaine Cloutier
- Jacques Cloutier
- Réal Cloutier
- Suzanne Cloutier
- T. J. Cloutier
- Véronique Cloutier
- Manuel Clouthier
- Tatiana Clouthier
- Manuel Clouthier Carrillo
- Tirso Cruz III
- Laura de Jonge
- Alexa Demie
- Céline Dion
- The Dionne quintuplets
- Xavier Dolan
- Diane Dufresne
- Nathan Fillion
- Bridget Fonda
- Marc-Aurèle Fortin
- Christine Frechette
- Éric Serge Gagné
- Ricky Gervais
- Ryan Gosling
- Catherine Goulet
- George R. D. Goulet
- Tag Goulet
- Nicolette Goulet
- Robert Goulet
- James Haven
- Camille Henry
- Derek Hough
- Julianne Hough
- Amy Jo Johnson
- Angelina Jolie
- The Jonas Brothers
- Frankie Jonas
- George Keppel
- Jack Kerouac
- Beyoncé Knowles
- Solange Knowles
- Lyndon LaRouche
- Brie Larson
- Ali Larter
- Avril Lavigne
- Karoline Leavitt
- Lynda Lemay
- Pope Leo XIV
- Jojo Levesque
- Jennette McCurdy
- Marie-Louise Meilleur
- Alanis Morissette
- Wade Morissette
- Anna Paquin
- Julie Payette
- Paul Picard
- Chris Pratt
- Lili Reinhart
- Grace Reiter
- Ginette Reno
- Gabriel Richard
- Kolton Richard
- Michael Sarrazin
- Louis St Laurent
- Sydney Sweeney
- Taylor Swift
- Diane Tell
- Délia Tétreault
- Justin Theroux
- Meghan Trainor
- Alex Trebek
- Justin Trudeau
- Pierre Trudeau
- Shania Twain
- Donnie Wahlberg
- Jeff Wahlberg
- Jim Wahlberg
- Mark Wahlberg
- Paul Wahlberg
- Robert Wahlberg

== Ancestry ==
Little is known about the Cloutier ancestors in France, beyond the names of the mother and father of Zacharie Cloutier, Denis Cloutier and Marie-Renée Brière.

The most common variation of the surname is Cloustier. Most sources state the surname was originally given to a person who crafted and sold nails, coming from the Latin word clavus 'nail' (clou in French). Some descendants of Cloutier who immigrated to the United States from Canada changed their surnames to Nailer in this respect.

A common error found in Internet family trees in 2004 was that Nicolas Cloutier was listed as Zacharie's grandfather, due to a misreading of "N.. Cloutier" as referring to a person whose first name started with the letter N, when in context the "N.." signified that the first name was unknown.

Ancestors of Zacharie Cloutier

2. Denis Cloutier
1. Zacharie Cloutier
3. Marie-Renée Brière

== Honours ==
In 1972, a house originally built and lived in by Cloutier was reconstructed and named a provincial heritage site.

In 1984, a monument was erected in Beauport (which has since been merged into Quebec City as of 2002) to commemorate the 350th anniversary of Cloutier's arrival.

An award-winning artisanal cheese bears his name.
