= Jean Guyon =

French colonist

Jean Guyon du Buisson
- Born: Perche, France
- Baptised: September 18, 1592
- Died: May 30, 1663 (aged 70); Beauport, Canada, New France
- Occupations: mason, habitant
- Spouse: Mathurine Robin
- Children: Jean Guyon du Buisson and nine others

Jean Guyon du Buisson (Bapt. September 18, 1592 – May 30, 1663) was the patriarch of one of the earliest families to settle on the North shore of New France's St. Lawrence River.

Guyon made his living as a master mason and, according to Perche-born genealogist Madame Montagne, was regarded as having an excellent reputation as a mason. In 1615, he helped construct the Saint-Aubin de Tourouvre church steeple's interior stone staircase and in 1625 he was charged with the re-building of Mortagne's fortifications.

== Habitant in New France ==
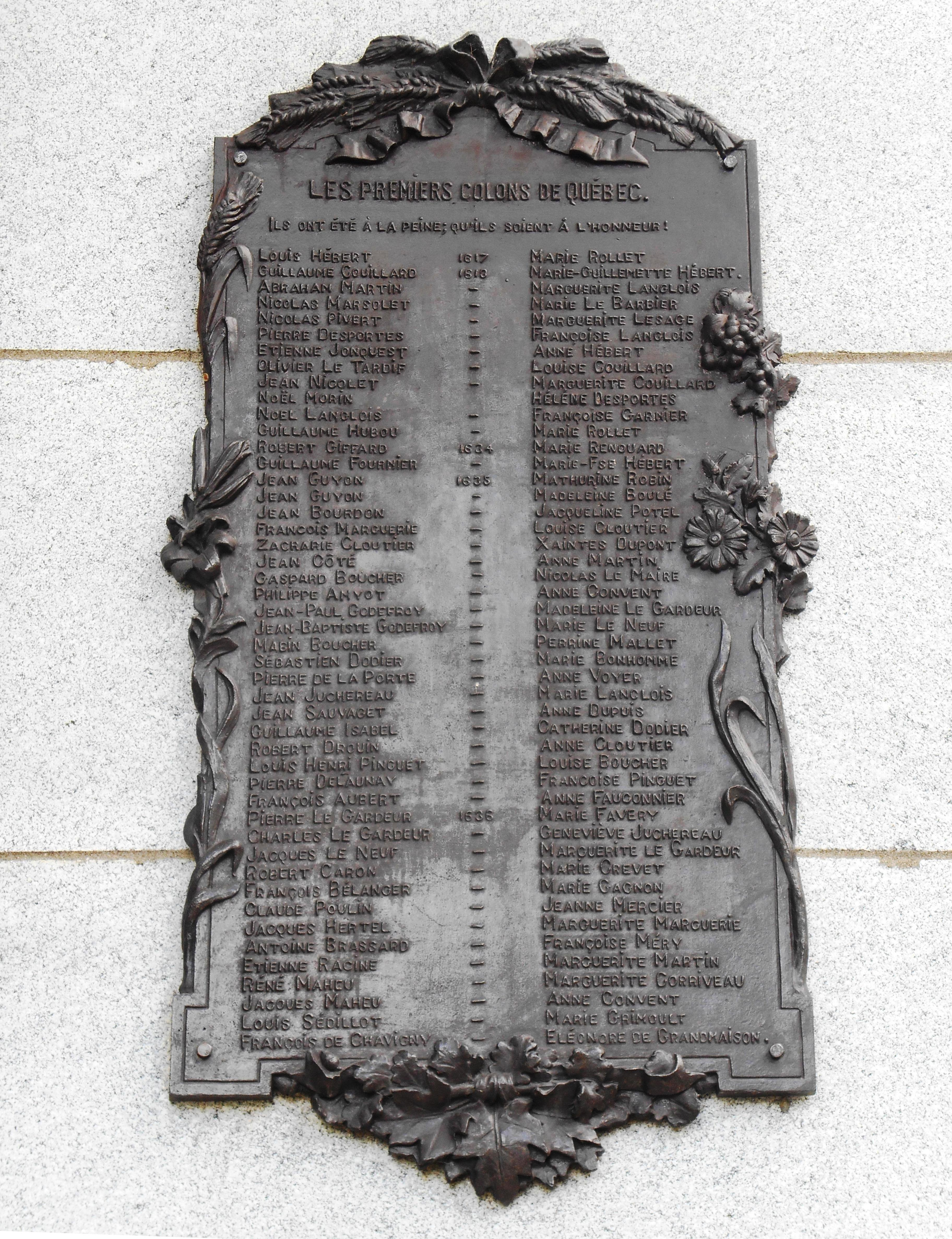
Plaque honouring the first settlers of Québec City. (Affixed to back of monument to Guillaume Couillard, which accompanies those to Louis Hébert and Marie Rollet.) Parc Montmorency, Québec City.

Guyon was from the village of Tourouvre's Saint-Aubin parish located in Chartres diocese, ancient Perche province, and present-day Normandy's Orne department. Guyon and his family emigrated from Perche province to New France on the North shore of the Saint Lawrence River near present-day Quebec city as part of the Percheron immigration movement, a pioneering group of about 300 colonists who settled in Canada in the three decades starting in 1632.

Robert Giffard de Moncel was granted by the Company of Hundred Associates the Beauport seigneurie, one of the New France's first seigneuries, Beauport now being a borough of Quebec City. The Beauport seigneurie was to be the first agriculturally-based settlement requiring the recruitment of tradesmen such as Guyon to establish the new colony. At the end of a three-year service contact taking effect on arrival in Canada, Guyon was in turn granted a one-thousand-arpent arrière-fief (subordinated-fief) land concession from Giffard.

Guyon traveled aboard a convoy of four ships under the command of Charles Duplessis-Bochart and arrived in New France in 1634. As Guyon's arrière-fief was located near rivière du Buisson (river of bushes), Guyon exercised his seigniorial system right to be known as Guyon du Buisson, or the sieur du Buisson.

He built a small mill and helped build the parish church of nearby Quebec and Giffard's seigniorial manor.

For nine years, he and Zacharie Cloutier disputed Giffard's seigniorial rights to receive foi et hommage (fealty and homage). Refusing to accept him as their superior, they did not stake their lands or pay him annual taxes. On July 19, 1646, the governor of the colony took action to force Cloutier and Guyon to comply with their contractual obligations. Such cases of censitaire refractoriness filled the time of the courts for the duration of the seigniorial system, both during the French regime and under the English.

His eldest son, who would become a royal surveyor of the colony and also was named Jean Guyon, married Élisabeth Couillard, daughter of Guillaume Couillard, New France's first settler to be ennobled by Louis XIV, and granddaughter of Louis Hébert, the first French colonist established with his family in New France. Their wedding was accompanied by the "two violins...which had not been seen yet in Canada."

After his death in 1693, his heirs engaged in a protracted legal dispute over his lands.

== Descendants ==
Guyon fathered ten children, eight of whom married, and he is known to be an ancestor of many French Canadians. By 2006, news media noted that at least three out of four Québécois descend from him. The descendants are often recognized as Dion, sometimes as Després, Dumontier, Lemoine, in Louisiana as Derbanne and Darbonne, and Texas as Berban.

According to Charbonneau et al. 1993, more than 2,150 births of Guyon descendants had by 1730 been recorded, and according to the Université de Montréal's Research Program in Historical Demography (PRDH), Guyon had by the end of the 19th century 9,674 married descendants, and thus ranked second among top New France pioneers in terms of number of married descendants. The PRDH program enabled neurological researchers to trace 40 cases of classical Friedreich's ataxia, a rare inherited disease, across 12 generations of previously thought unrelated French-Canadians descendants to one common ancestral couple: Guyon and his wife Mathurine Robin. The disease causes progressive damage to the nervous system resulting in symptoms ranging from gait disturbance and speech problems to heart disease. The finding allows for gene chromosomal localization studies that had previously been judged to be almost impossible in rare autosomal recessive disorders.

== Notable Descendants ==
Guyon and Mathurine Robin have a number of notable descendants, including:

- Justin Bieber
- Céline Dion
- Shania Twain
- Madonna Ciccone
- Avril Lavigne
- Ricky Gervais
- Jim Carrey
- Alex Trebek
- Chris Pratt
- Justin Theroux
- Ryan Gosling
- Hillary Clinton
- Nathan Fillion
- Camilla, Queen of the United Kingdom

== Toponymy and memorials ==
In 1984, the 350th anniversary of Guyon's arrival, Quebec City named a park after him and a commemorative plaque to honour Guyon was mounted on the church in Beauport by the Association des Dion d'Amérique inc. In 2006, the city renamed a street after him.

== Bibliography ==
- CIEQ - Centre interuniversitaire d'études québécoises, Inventaire des lieux de mémoire de la Nouvelle-France, Université Laval
- DCB - Dictionary of Canadian Biography, Université Laval / University of Toronto
- Fichier Origine - Répertoire informatisé de la Fédération québécoise des sociétés de généalogie en partenariat avec la Fédération française de généalogie
- "Programme de recherche en démographie historique" [The Research Program in Historical Demography] (in French). Université de Montréal. Archived from the original on 2012-11-05.
- PREFEN - Programme de Recherche sur l'Émigration des Français En Nouvelle-France, Université de Caen
- Bailey, Patricia (December 6, 2006). "Liberal leader, singer share an ancestor: New France's Jean Guyon, father of 10, sired 75% of purebred Quebecers". Ottawa Citizen (Online).
- Barbeau, A.; Sadibelouiz, M.; Roy, M.; Lemieux, B.; Bouchard, J. P.; Geoffroy, G. (Nov 1984). "Origin of Friedreich's disease in Quebec Canadian". Can J Neurol Sci. 11 (4 Suppl). Journal of Neurologic Science: 506–9. doi:10.1017/S0317167100034971. PMID 6391645.
- CIEQ (Online). "Plaque commémorative Jean Guyon". Archived from the original on 2018-04-10.
- Virtual Museum of New France (Online). "Social Groups". Canadian Museum of History.
- Charbonneau, Hubert; Desjardins, Bertrand; Boleda, Mario; Bates, Real (1993). The First French Canadians - Pioneers in the St. Lawrence Valley. Translated by Paola Colozzo. University of Delaware Press. ISBN 0-87413-454-4.
- "GUYON / BUISSON, Jean". www.fichierorigine.com. Archived from the original on 25 Feb 2025.
- Grenier, Benoît (n.d.). "Beauport "Seigneurie"". Encyclopedia of French Cultural Heritage in North America (Online).
- "Madonna, Celine and Camilla all swing from the same genealogical tree". Inside Entertainment Online. 23 March 2006.
- Langevin, Jean (1860). Notes sur les archives de Notre-Dame de Beauport. Archived from the original on 2016-01-01.
- Lebel, Gérard (1983). Nos ancêtres [Our French-Canadian ancestors]. Translated by Thomas J. Laforest. Palm Harbor, Fla.: LISI Press. ISBN 0-914163-00-0.
- Montagne, Françoise (1965). Tourouvre et les Juchereau –Un chapitre de l'émigration percheronne au Canada, Contribution No 13. Société canadienne de Généalogie (Québec) / Association Perche-Canada.
- perche-quebec.com (Online). "Jean Guyon (1592 Tourouvre - 1663 Beauport), Arbre de parenté avec Céline Dion".
- PRDH (Online) (February 2017). "The Pioneers". Archived from the original on 2007-06-09.
- "Jean GUYON, sieur du Buisson" (PDF) (PREFEN Fiche 8124, Notice Complémentaire). 2005. Archived from the original (PDF) on 3 Dec 2018.
- Provost, Honorius (1966). GUYON DU BUISSON, JEAN. p. in DCB vol. 1 (Online).
- Ville de Québec, Répertoire des toponymes - Fiche toponymique (Online). parc Jean-Guyon. Archived from the original on 2014-03-30.
