= 1617 in Quebec =

Events from the year 1617 in Quebec.

== Events ==
- Louis Hébert, his wife Marie Rollet and their children settle in Quebec. Hébert becomes the first apothecary in New France. In 1800, Hébert and his wife would already have 4592 married descendants in Quebec, making the couple one of the most important in French-Canadian ancestry.
