= Guillaume Couillard =

Guillaume Couillard may be:

- Guillaume Couillard (tennis player)
- Guillaume Couillard, French settler
