= Montmorency Park =

Montmorency Park may refer to:

- Montmorency Falls Park
- Parc Montmorency
