= Lynda Lemay =

Canadian singer-songwriter (born 1966)

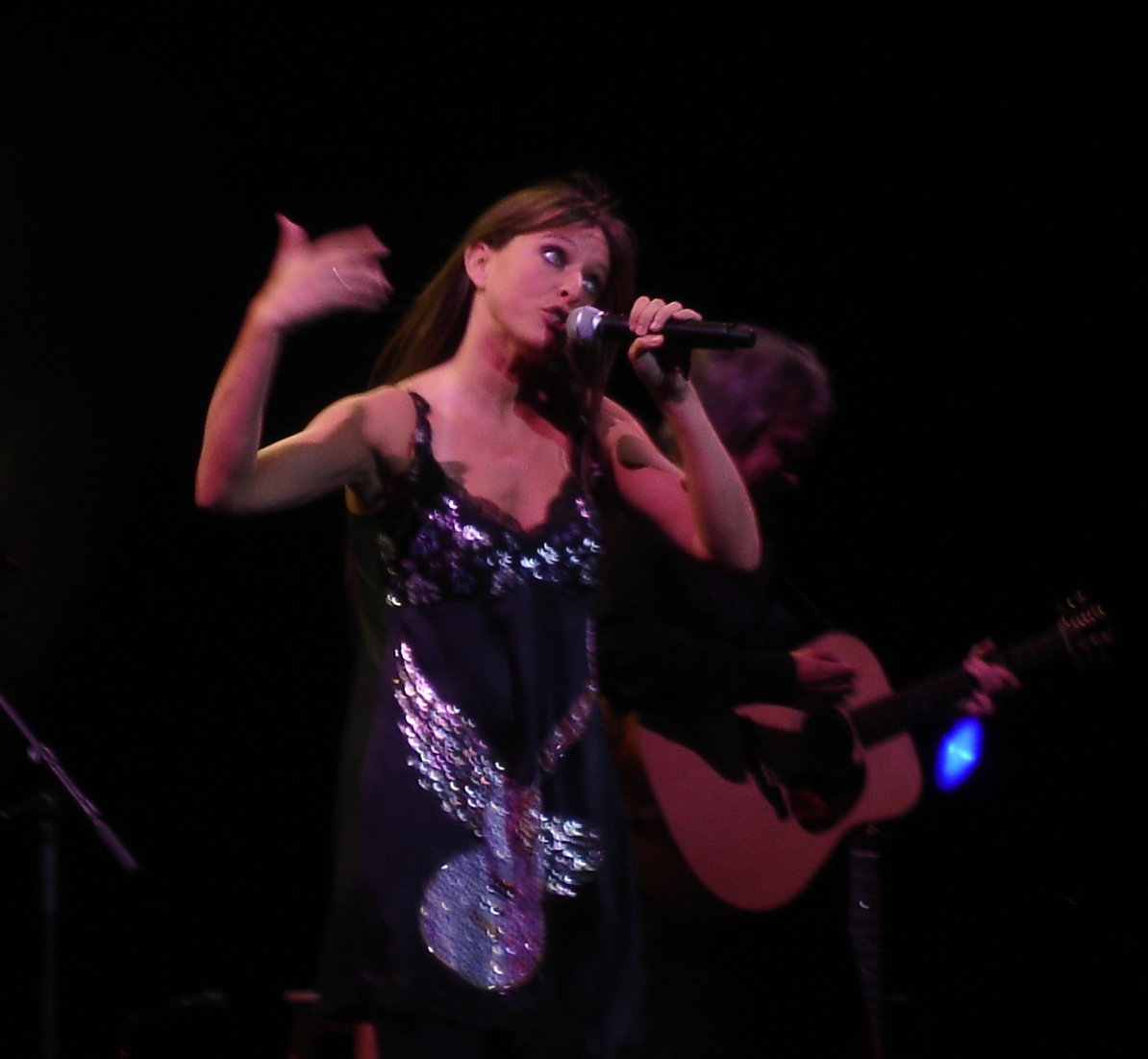
- Lemay during a concert in Carcassonne in July 2007

Background information
- Born: Lynda Lemay; 25 July 1966 (age 60); Portneuf, Quebec, Canada
- Origin: Portneuf, Quebec, Canada
- Genres: Chanson
- Occupations: Singer-songwriter, guitarist
- Instruments: Vocals, guitar
- Years active: 1989–present
- Website: www.lyndalemay.com

Lynda Lemay (born 25 July 1966) is a Canadian francophone singer-songwriter. Through her mother she is a descendant of Zacharie Cloutier.

After winning regional awards in 1989 she went to France and regularly tours in Quebec and France, including at the Paris Olympia.

Her recording "Live" was nominated as one of the best-selling Francophone albums at the 2000 Juno Awards.

== Discography ==
=== Albums ===
| Year | Album | Peak positions | | | | | Certifications |
| Year | Album | CAN | BEL (Fl) | BEL (Wa) | FRA | SWI | Certifications |
|---|---|---|---|---|---|---|---|
| 1990 | Nos rêves | – | – | – | 116 | – | |
| 1994 | Y | – | – | – | – | – | MC: 2× Platinum |
| 1996 | La visite | – | – | – | – | – | |
| 1998 | Lynda Lemay | 10 | – | 38 | 42 | – | MC: Gold |
| 1999 | Live | – | – | 28 | 2 | 56 | MC: Gold |
| 2000 | Du coq à l'âme | – | – | 37 | 1 | 29 | MC: Gold |
| 2000 | Les lettres rouges | – | – | 3 | 1 | 5 | MC: Gold |
| 2003 | Les secrets des oiseaux | – | – | 3 | 2 | 13 | |
| 2005 | Un paradis quelque part | – | – | – | 20 | – | |
| 2005 | Un éternel hiver (musical) | – | – | 22 | 22 | 29 | |
| 2006 | Ma signature | – | – | 3 | 2 | 16 | |
| 2008 | Allo c'est moi | – | – | 6 | 5 | 16 | |
| 2008 | Blessée | – | – | 3 | 3 | 22 | |
| 2013 | Feutres et pastels | – | 184 | 5 | 5 | 14 | |
| 2016 | Décibels et des silences | 33 | – | 4 | 5 | 11 | |
| 2020 | Il était onze fois | – | – | 34 | 113 | – | |
| 2020 | Des milliers de plumes | – | – | 43 | 89 | – | |
| 2020 | À la croisée des humains | – | – | 14 | 86 | 55 | |
| 2021 | De la rosée dans les yeux | – | – | 12 | 84 | 56 | |
| 2023 | Il n'y a qu'un pas | – | – | 90 | 67 | 48 | |
| 2023 | Entre la flamme et la suie – Amours et patterns | – | – | 83 | 134 | – | |
| 2023 | Des bordées de mots | – | – | 110 | 150 | – | |
| 2023 | Critiquement incorrecte – mauvais goût et maux vécus | – | – | 145 | 159 | – | |
| 2023 | Le baiser de l'horizon | – | – | 136 | – | – | |
| 2023 | Entre le rêve et le souvenir – Chansons de mes débuts | – | – | 161 | – | – | |

=== Compilation albums ===
| Year | Album | Peak positions | | | |
| Year | Album | CAN | BEL (Wa) | FRA | SWI |
|---|---|---|---|---|---|
| 2011 | Best Of | 12 | 6 | 19 | 41 |

== Awards and recognition ==
- 1995: 4 Félix Award nominations: Female Artist of the Year, Pop Album of the Year (Y), Songwriter of the Year, Concert of the Year
- 1996: Félix Award nomination: Artist with best recognition outside Quebec
- 1998: Félix Award winner, Female Artist of the Year; 4 other Félix nominations: Pop Album of the Year (Lynda Lemay), Best Selling Album of the Year (ibid.), Concert of the Year, Artist with best recognition outside Quebec
- 1999: 2 Félix Award nominations: Pop Album of the Year (Lynda Lemay live), Artist with best recognition outside Quebec
- 2000: Félix Award winner, Artist with best recognition outside Quebec
- 2001: 4 Félix Award nominations: Female Artist of the Year, Pop Album of the Year (Du coq à l'âme), Concert of the Year, Quebec Artist with most recognition outside Quebec
- 2002: 3 Félix Award nominations: Female Artist of the Year, Pop Album of the Year (Les lettres rouges), Quebec Artist with best recognition outside Quebec
- 2004: Félix Award nomination: Quebec Artist with best recognition outside Quebec
