= Beauport, Quebec City =

Beauport
- Borough
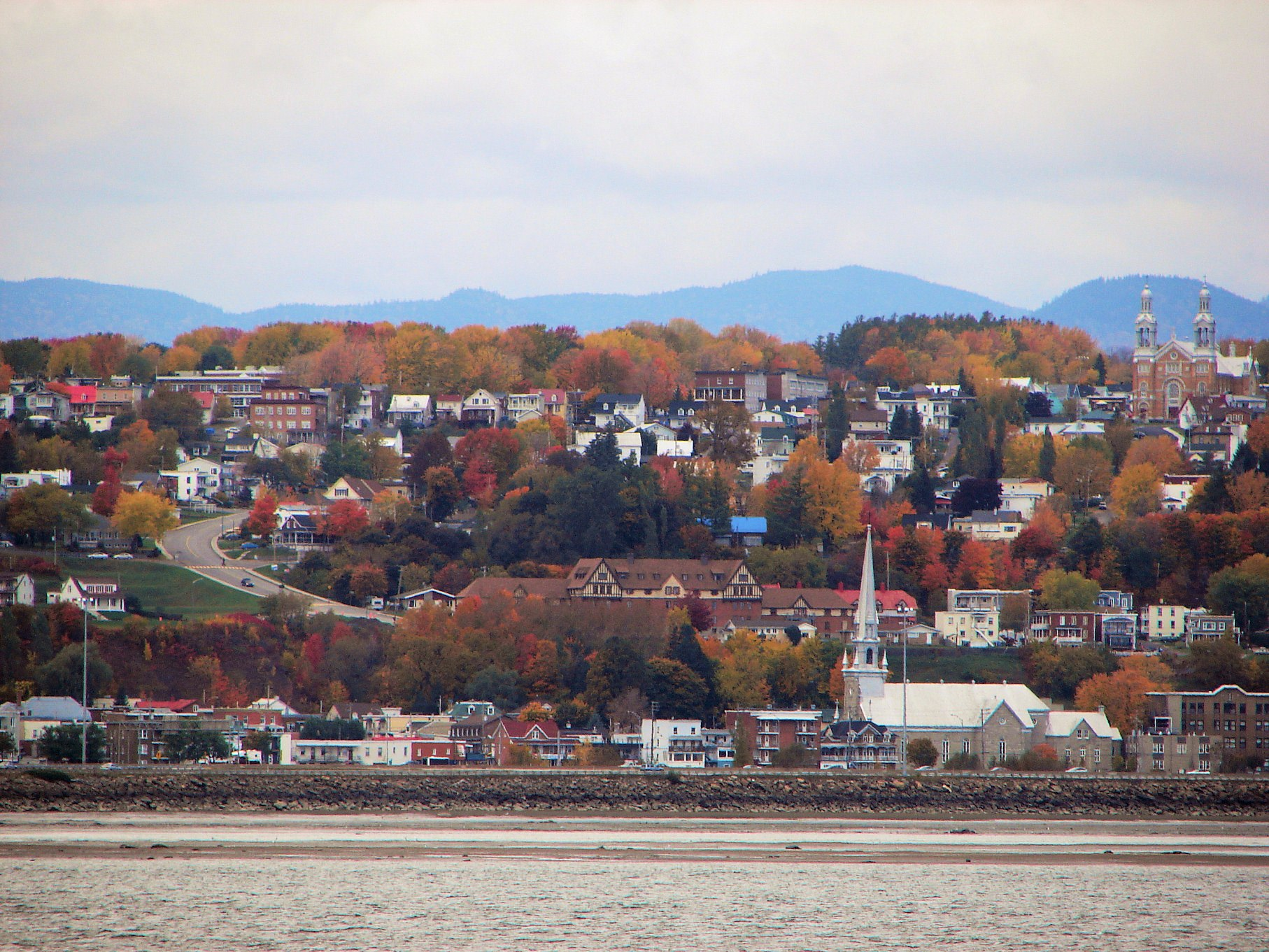
- Beauport as seen from Île d'Orléans
- Motto: "Fide Et Labore Valebo" (Latin) "My worthiness stems from my faith and labour"
- Quebec City with Beauport in red
- Country: Canada
- Province: Quebec
- Municipality: Quebec City
- Settled: 17th century
- Incorporated: 1634
- Merged: January 1, 2002

Government
  - Type: Borough
  - Mayor: Bruno Marchand
  - Councillors: List of Councillors: Marie France Trudel; Julie Lemieux; Lisette Lepage; Marc Simoneau

Area
  - Total: 74.37 km^{2} (28.71 sq mi)

Population (2006)^{[1]}
  - Total: 74,881
  - Density: 1,006.9/km^{2} (2,608/sq mi)
- Time zone: UTC-5 (EST)
  - Summer (DST): UTC-4 (EDT)
- Area codes: 418 and 581

Beauport (French pronunciation: [bopɔʁ]) is a borough of Quebec City, Quebec, Canada on the Saint Lawrence River.

Beauport is a northeastern suburb of Quebec City. Manufacturers include paint, construction materials, printers, and hospital supplies. Food transportation is important to the economy. Attractions include Parc de la Chute-Montmorency (Montmorency Falls Park), which contains a fortification built in 1759 by James Wolfe and Manoir Montmorency, the home from 1791 to 1794 of Prince Edward, Duke of Kent and Strathearn.

The city's historic district contains many interesting churches and homes, including Bélanger-Girardin House, a National Historic Site of Canada where visitors can learn about Beauport's heritage. Annual events include the spring arts festival Salon de Mai and the summer Festival Folklorique des enfants du monde, a multicultural and international children's folklore festival.

== History ==
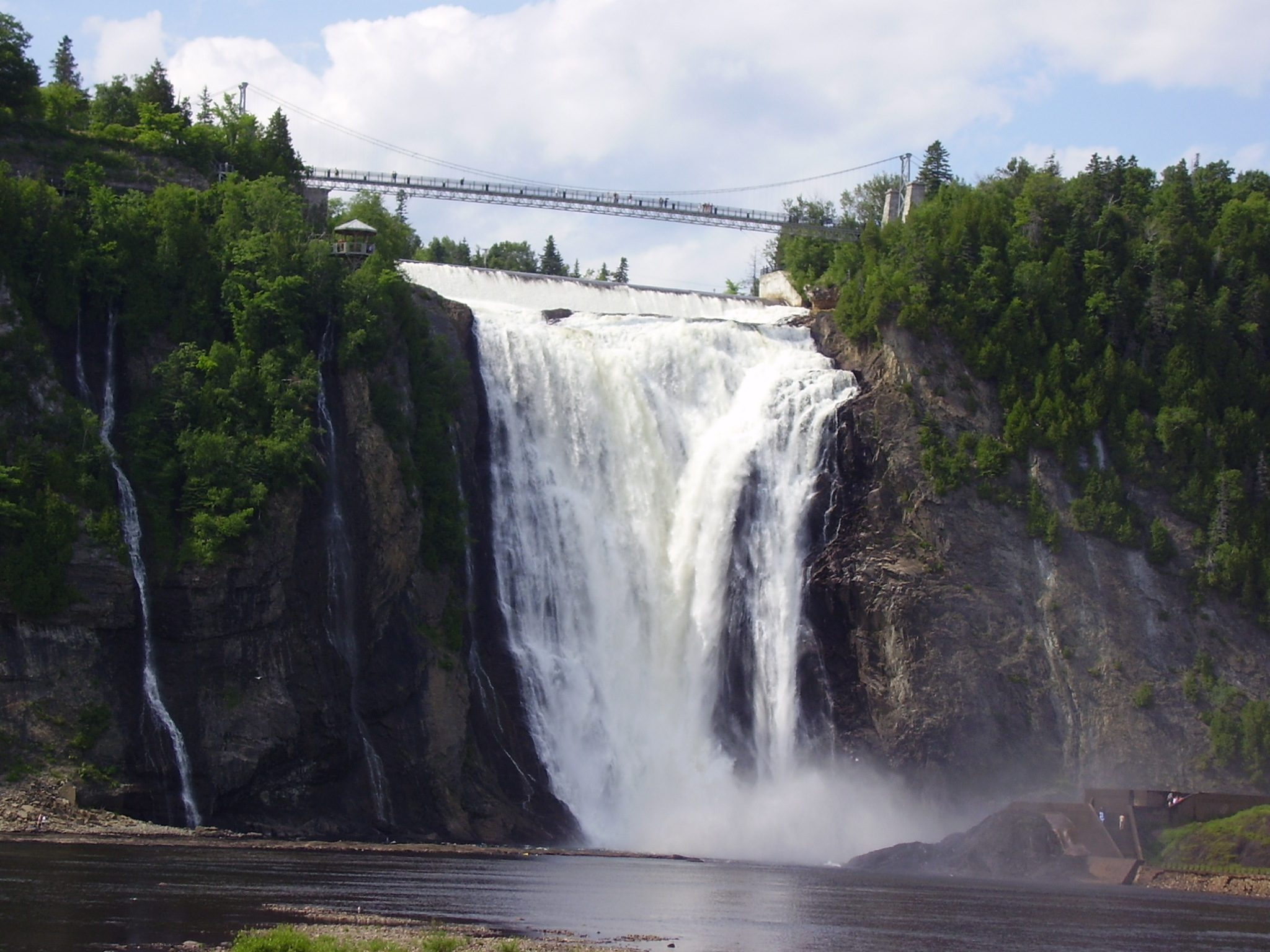
The Montmorency River and Falls form the eastern boundary of Beauport.

Beauport was established in 1634, making it one of the oldest European-founded communities in Canada.

An Internment camp was set up at The Armoury in Beauport, Quebec from December 1914 to June 1916.

It was incorporated as a city in 1976 through the amalgamation of seven municipalities (Beauport, Saint-Michel-Archange, Giffard, Villeneuve, Montmorency, Courville and Sainte-Thérèse-de-Lisieux). During the 1990s its population continued to grow because of its economic diversification, available space, and outdoor recreational opportunities. On January 1, 2002, Beauport was merged into Quebec City.

== Demographics ==
According to the Canada 2006 Census:

- Population: 74,881
- % Change (2001-2006): +2.8
- Dwellings: 31,461
- Area (km^{2}): 74.37 km^{2}
- Density (persons per km^{2}): 1,006.8

== Notable people ==
- Zacharie Cloutier
- Adrien Dufresne
- Jean Guyon
- Manon Rhéaume

== See also ==
- Chenal de l'Île d'Orléans
- Charlevoix tourist train
- List of former cities in Quebec
- Municipal reorganization in Quebec
