= Hélène Desportes =

First white child born in Canada

- Born: c. 1620; Canada, New France
- Died: June 24, 1675 (aged 54–55); Saint-Thomas, New France
- Occupation: Midwife
- Spouses: Joseph Guillaume Hébert (1634–1639) Noël Morin (m. 1640)
- Children: 15
- Parent(s): Pierre Desportes; Françoise Langlois
- Relatives: Hélène Boullé (godmother); Louis Hébert (father-in-law); Marie Rollet (mother-in-law); Guillaume Couillard (brother-in-law)

Hélène Desportes (c. 1620 – June 24, 1675) is often cited as the first white child born in Canada (New France). There is considerable disagreement about when she was born and, in particular, if she was born in Quebec or just before she arrived on the continent.

== Early life ==
Her parents were French habitants Pierre Desportes (1580 – after 1629), who was in charge of the warehouse in Quebec as well as the village baker, and his wife Françoise Langlois (c1595 – after 1629), who settled in Quebec. Her father was a lawyer in the Parlement de Paris and an investor in the Company of 100 Associates which funded Champlain's colony. Her godmother was Madame Hélène Boullé, the wife of Samuel de Champlain. In his will, Champlain left her 300 livres (about $15,000 in 1997).

After the fall of Québec City in 1629, Hélène and her parents, along with Champlain were transported to London, and then back to France. Shortly after peace was restored in 1632, Hélène returned to Québec, on May 16, 1633.

== Personal life ==
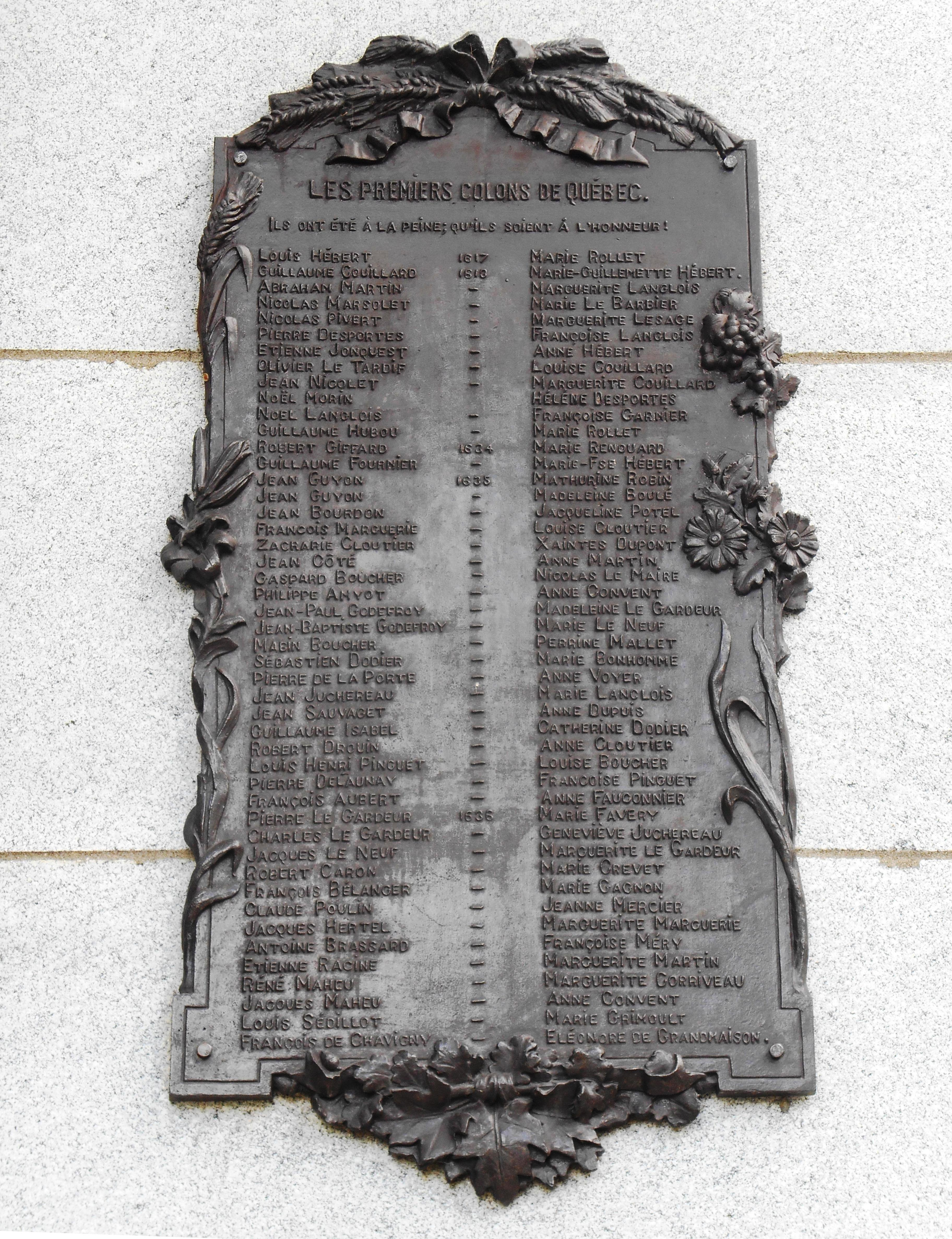
Plaque honouring the first settlers of Québec City. (Affixed to back of monument to Guillaume Couillard, which accompanies those to Louis Hébert and Marie Rollet.) Parc Montmorency, Québec City.

On the first of October 1634, Hélène married Joseph Guillaume Hébert, son of Louis Hébert and Marie Rollet. Joseph's family had remained in Québec during the occupation and had the first settler's farm there. His father Louis Hébert had been involved in early expeditions to Port Royal with Champlain and others. After Joseph Hebert died in 1639, Hélène at age nineteen, was left with three living children, Joseph (1636–1662), Françoise (1638–1716), and Angélique (born 1639).

She then married Noël Morin — a native of the parish of St-Étienne in Brie-Comte-Robert, a village near Paris — on January 9, 1640, in Quebec City. They had 12 children. Agnes Morin (1641–1687), Germain Morin (1642–1702), Louise Morin (1643–1713), Nicolas Morin (1644–), Jean-Baptiste Morin Belleroche (1645–1694), Marguerite Morin (1646–1646), Hélène Morin (1647–1661), Marie Morin (1649–1730), Alphonse Morin (1650–1711), Noël Morin (1652–1666), Charles Morin (1654–1671), and Marie-Madeleine Morin (1656–1720).

Aided by her aunt Marguerite Langlois, who was the first midwife cited in Church records in Quebec, and having personally brought so many of her own children into the world, Hélène earned the profession of midwife. The earliest known baptismal record with Hélène listed as midwife dates from 1659.

In time, two of Hélène's daughters, a daughter-in-law, and three granddaughters also became midwives, being cited in Church records as "sage-femmes" in the communities of Château-Richer, Cap-St-Ignace, and Montmagny.

== Notable Descendants ==
Hélène has a number of notable descendants, including:

- Carolyn Bessette Kennedy
- Angelina Jolie
- Justin Bieber
- Céline Dion
- Madonna Ciccone
- Avril Lavigne
- Jack Kerouac
- Alex Trebek
- Chris Pratt
- Ryan Gosling
- Justin Trudeau
- Ricky Gervais
- Jim Carrey
- Nathan Fillion
- Alanis Morissette

== See also ==
- Martín de Argüelles, often cited as the first white child born in what is now the United States.
