= The Battlefields Park =

Urban park in Quebec City, Canada

Coordinates: 46°47′59″N 71°13′15″W

An artillery piece on display at The Battlefields Park

The Battlefields Park (French: Parc des Champs-de-Bataille) includes the Plains of Abraham with the nearby and smaller Des Braves park, both within the district of Montcalm in Quebec City, and forms one of the few Canadian national urban parks. Its significance lies in the Battle of the Plains of Abraham (1759) and the Battle of Sainte-Foy, fought six months later on today's Des Braves park.

It was established as a park by law on March 17, 1908. It features an interpretive centre and walking trails, and is sometimes used for outdoor concerts, especially during the national festival events. The park contains a collection of about 50 historical artillery pieces scattered about its grounds. It is managed by the National Battlefields Commission, a federal government agency under the Minister of Canadian Heritage with members appointed by the King in his Canadian, Ontarian, and Québécois Councils. The commission also oversees its own police service since 1948.

== Martello towers ==
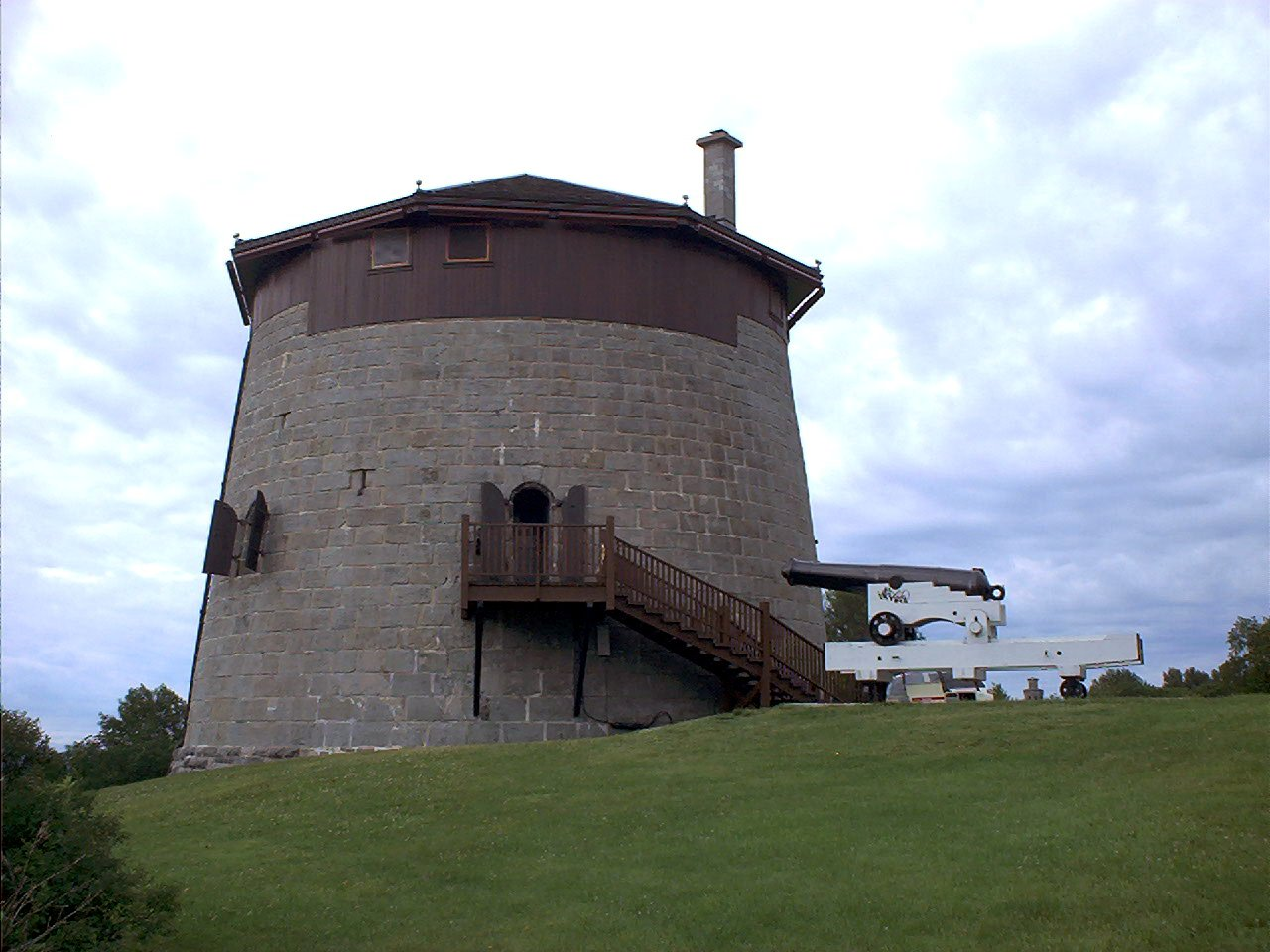
Martello Tower No. 1. Note the reconstruction of the gun, carriage, and swiveling gun carriage platform that originally surmounted the tower.

Built by the British to prevent the Americans from drawing close enough to lay siege to the walls of Quebec, the four Martello towers were begun by James Craig in 1808 and completed in 1812. The towers were arranged to provide for each other's defence, being situated along an axis that bisects the Plains of Abraham from the northwest to the southeast in order to screen the western approach to Quebec City, and were numbered rather than named. Tower No. 3 was demolished in the 1900s but the other three remain. The limited openings on the tower were designed to prevent the enemy from taking it by storm, while the tower's rounded shape (to deflect projectiles) and thick masonry walls made it nearly impervious to artillery fire.

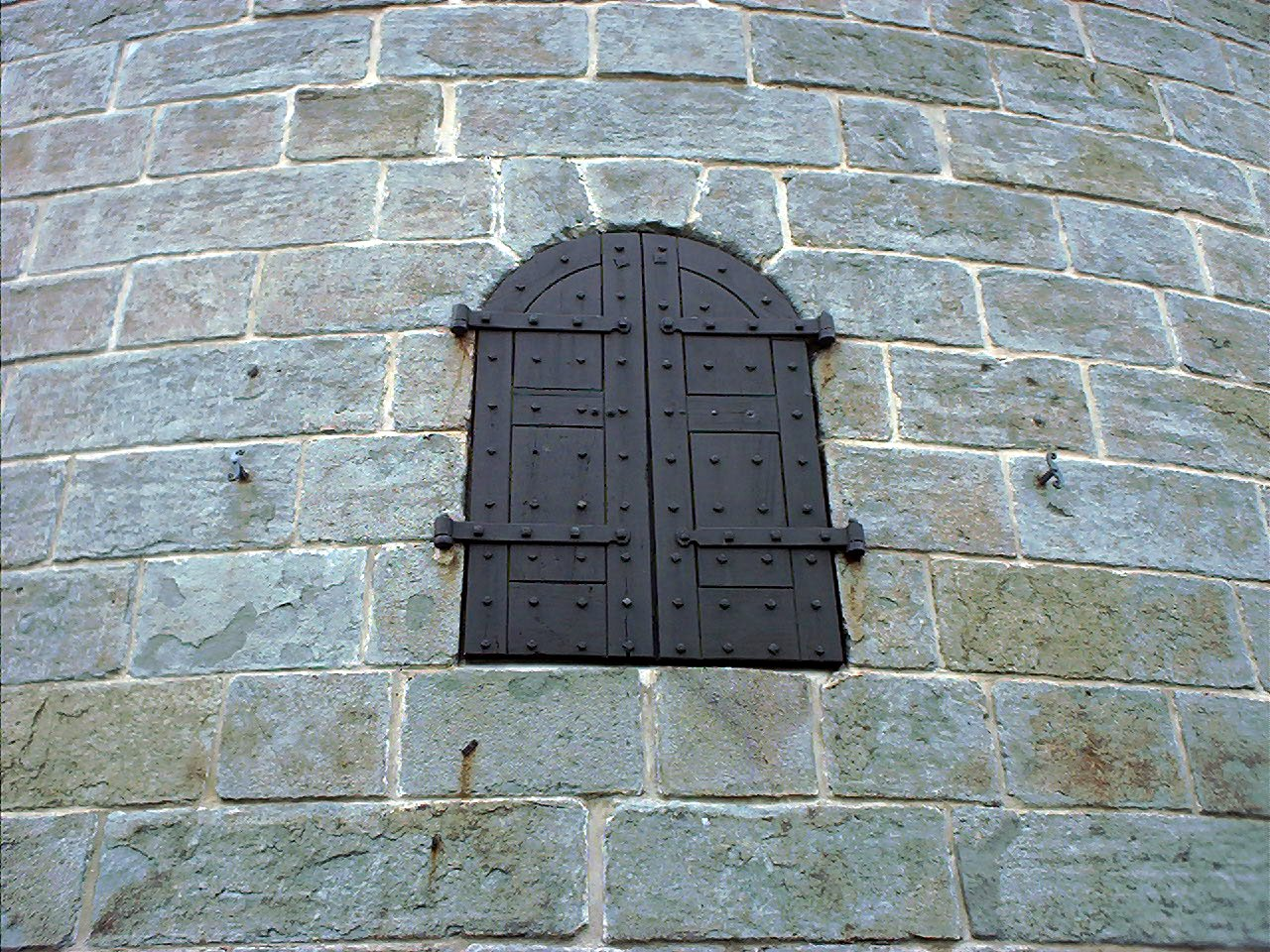
Martello Tower door

The doors to the tower are at a height of twice the height of a man – about 4.5 metres (14.8 feet) – and could only be reached by a removable ladder. The towers were never tested in battle, and became obsolete in the 1860s with the development of rifled artillery, which was powerful enough to breach their walls.

Using the theme of military engineering Martello Tower No. 1 is open for visitors to view its three floors during the summer months.

The Martellos were originally fitted with removable roofs in the fall to keep snow from accumulating on the gun platform at the top and removed in the spring. The roofs were later replaced with newer permanent ones which look almost the same.

The three towers were designated a national historic site in 1990, and also form part of the Fortifications of Quebec National Historic Site.

One of the three towers is located within the city streets away from the park.
