= Parc Montmorency =

Urban park in Quebec City, Canada

Coordinates: 46.813674°N 71.204195°W

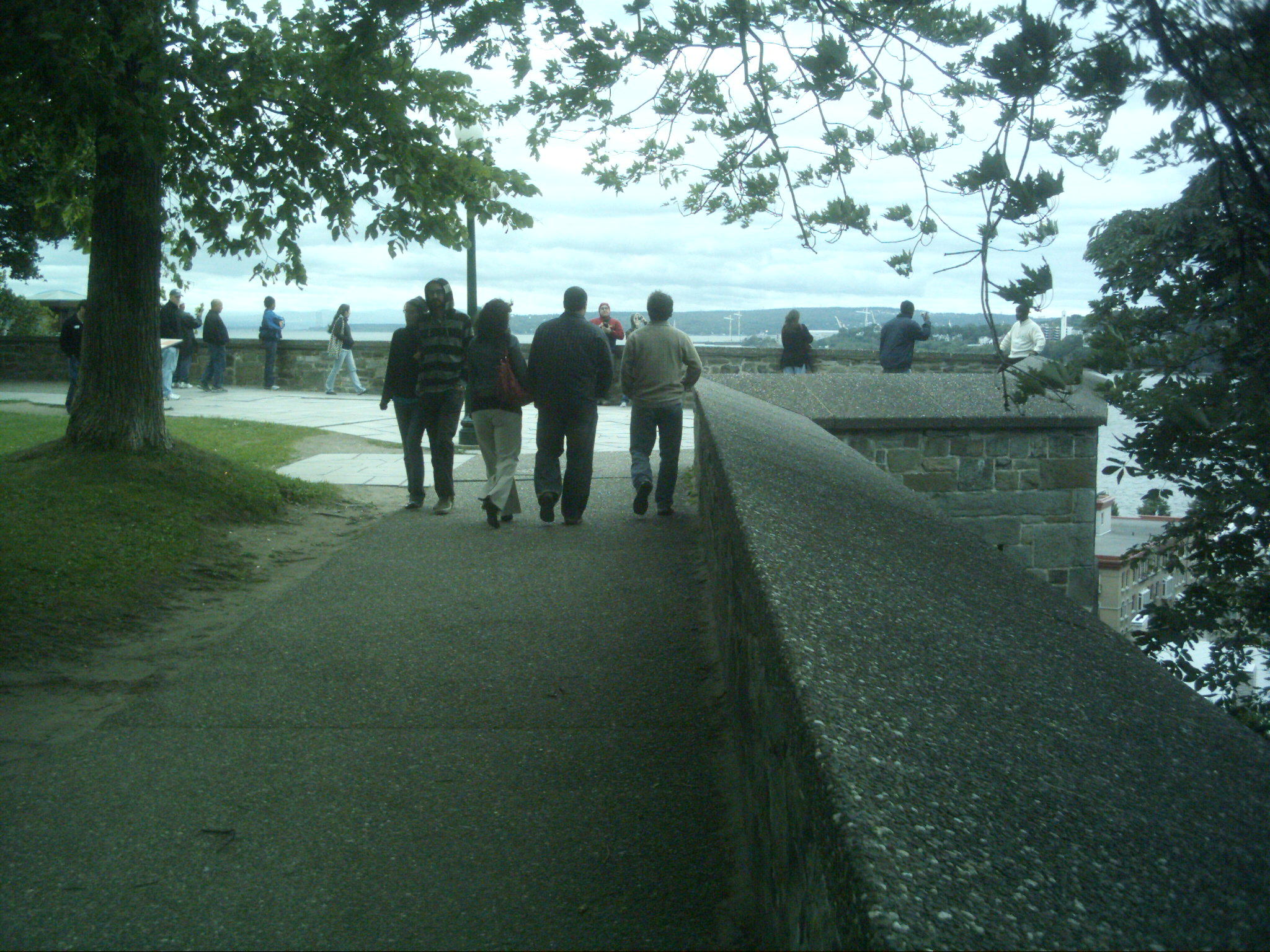
view of St Lawrence River from Parc Montmorency ramparts

Parc Montmorency (French pronunciation: [paʁk mɔ̃mɔʁɑ̃si]) is a park located in Quebec City and home to Parliaments of Lower Canada, Canada East and Quebec from 1791 to 1883. It is named for Henri II, Duke of Montmorency, the viceroy of New France, 1619–1625, under the French king, Louis XIII.

The site sits above the St. Lawrence River and bounded by Côte de la Montagne and Rue Port Dauphin. The last building was demolished in 1883 and in 1894 city opened it as Parc Frontenac.

The park is partially covered by trees with walkways and signs describing the historical importance of the site.

In 1949 the park was recognized as a national historic site.

== Monuments ==
There are several cannons and statues:

- George-Étienne Cartier- Prime Minister of United Provinces of Canada and Father of Confederation
- Monument for Louis Hébert, Guillaume Couillard and Marie Rollet - first farmers of New France c. 1617

== See also ==
- The Battlefields Park

== First settlers of Québec City ==
Text of the plaque

"Les premiers colons de Québec. Ils ont été à la peine: qu'ils soient à l'honneur."

"The first settlers of Quebec. They were saddened: let them be in the spotlight."

Louis Hébert (1617) Marie Rollet, Couillard (1618) Marie-Guillemette Hébert, Abraham Martin - Marguerite Langlois, Nicolas Marcolet - Marie Le Barbier, Nicolas Pivert - Marguerite Lesage, Pierre Desportes - Françoise Langlois, Étienne Jonquest - Anne Hébert, Olivier Le Tardif - Louise Couillard, Jean Nicolet - Marguerite Couillard, Noël Morin - Hélène Desportes, Noël Langlois - Françoise Garnier, Guillaume Hubou - Marie Rollet, Robert Giffard (1634) Marie Renouard, Guillaume Fournier - Marie Fse Hébert, Jean Guyon (1635) Mathurine Robin, Jean Guyon - Madeleine Boulé, Jean Bourdon - Jacqueline Potel, François Marguerie - Louise Cloutier, Zacharie Cloutier - Xaintès Dupont, Jean Côté - Anne Martin, Gaspard Boucher - Nicolas Le Maire, Philippe Amyot - Anne Convent, Jean-Paul Godefroy - Madeleine Le Gardeur, Jean-Baptiste Godefroy - Marie Le Neuf, Mobin Boucher - Perrine Mallet, Sébastien Dodier - Marie Bonhomme, Pierre de la Porte - Anne Voyer, Jean Juchereau - Marie Langlois, Jean Sauvaget - Anne Dupuis, Guillaume Isabel - Catherine Dodier, Robert Drouin - Anne Cloutier, Louis-Henri Pinguet - Louise-Boucher, Pierre Delauney - Françoise Pinguet, François Aubert - Anne Fauconnier, Pierre Le Gardeur (1638) Marie Favery, Charles Le Gardeur - Geneviève Juchereau, Jacques Le Neuf - Marguerite Le Gardeur, Robert Caron - Marie Crevet, François Bélanger - Marie Gagnon, Claude Poulin - Jeanne Mercier, Jacques Hertel - Marguerite Marguerie, Antoine Brassard - Françoise Méry, Étienne Racine - Marguerite Martin, René Maheu - Marguerite Corriveau, Jacques Maheu - Anne Convent, Louis Sédillot - MarieGrimoult, François de Chavigny - Eléonore de Grandmaison.

== Images ==
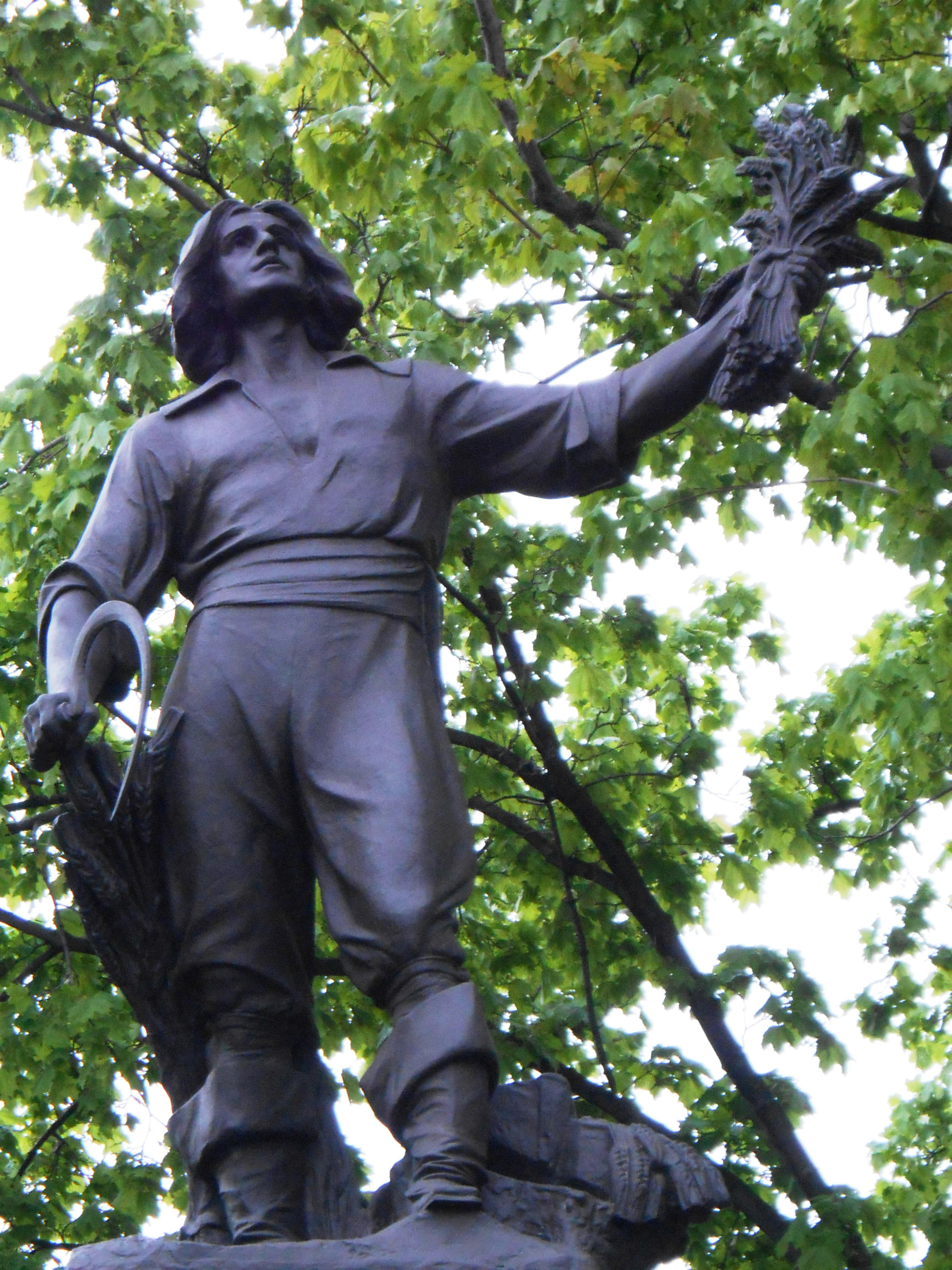
Louis Hebert, apothecary

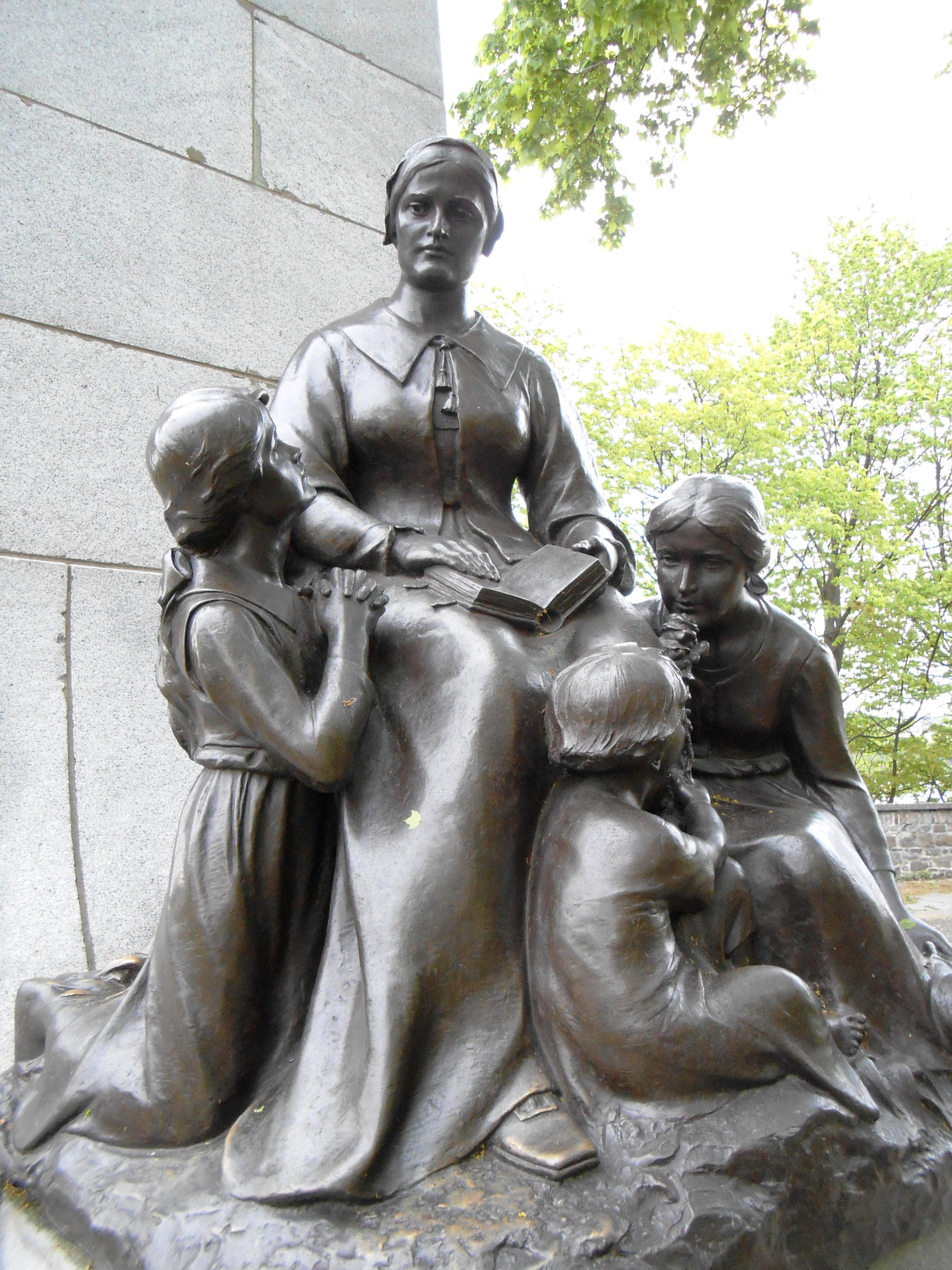
Marie Rollet with children

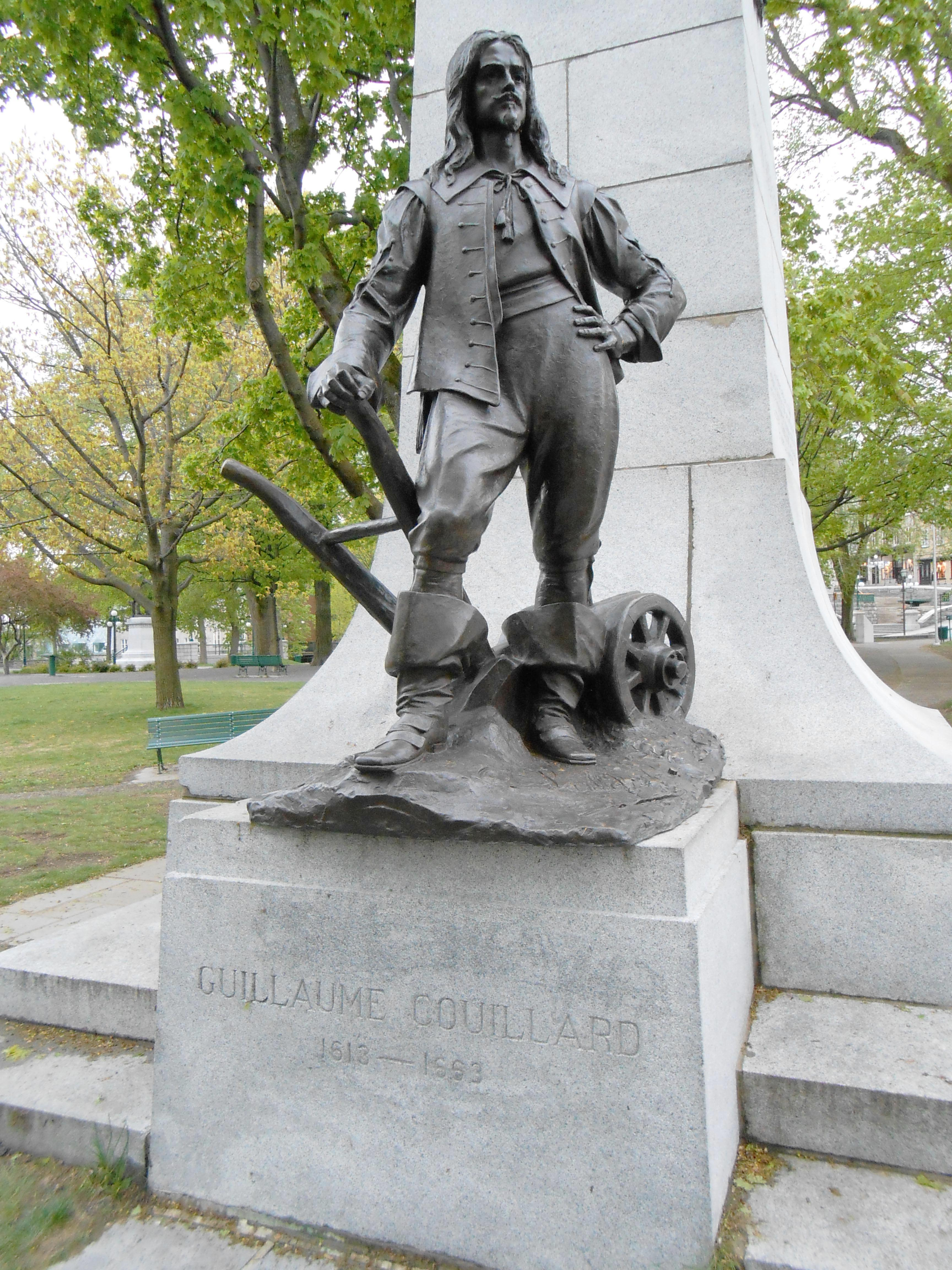
Guillaume Couillard

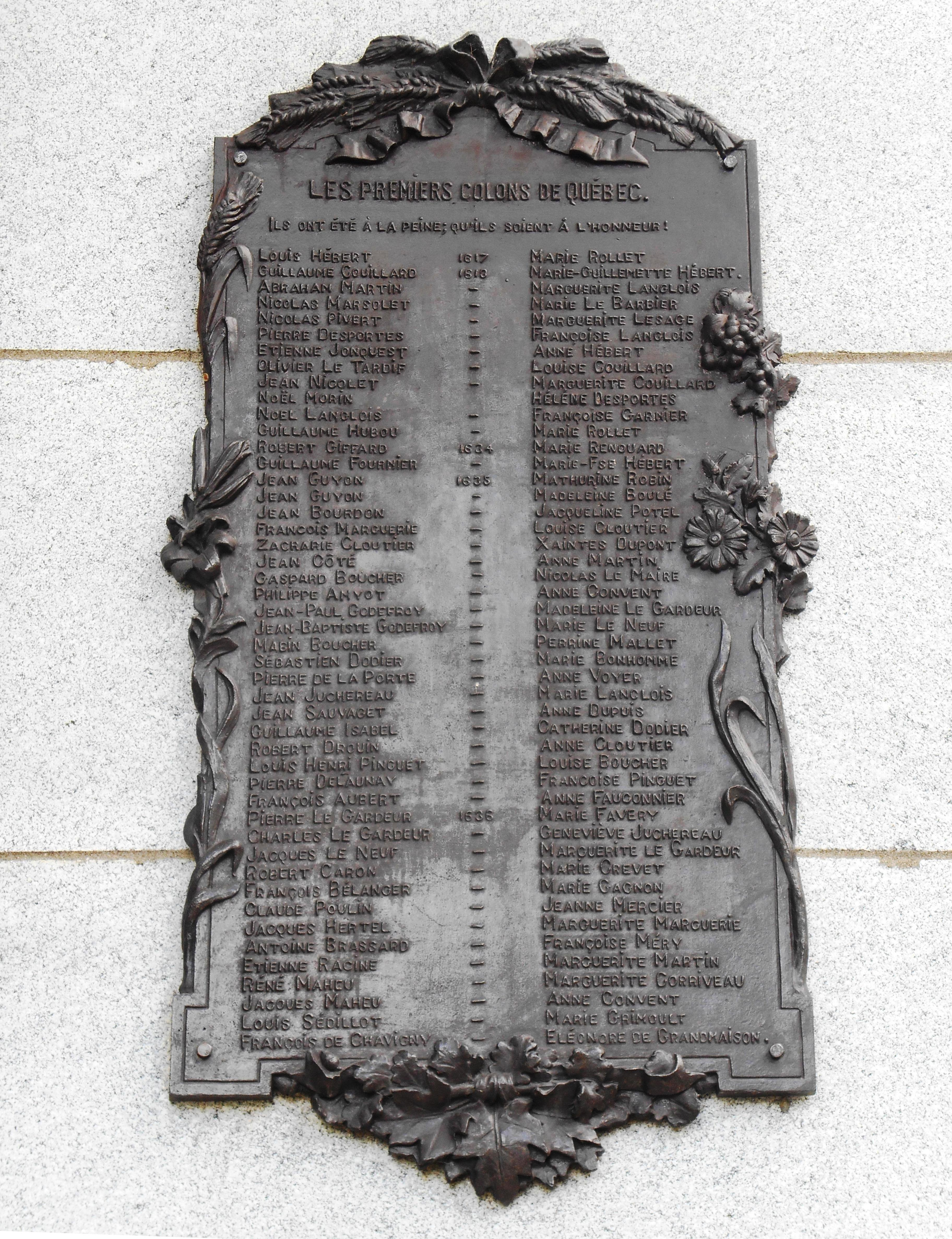
Plaque honouring the first settlers of Québec City. (Affixed to back of monument to Guillaume Couillard, which accompanies those to Louis Hébert and Marie Rollet.)
