= Marie Rollet =

First European woman to settle Quebec

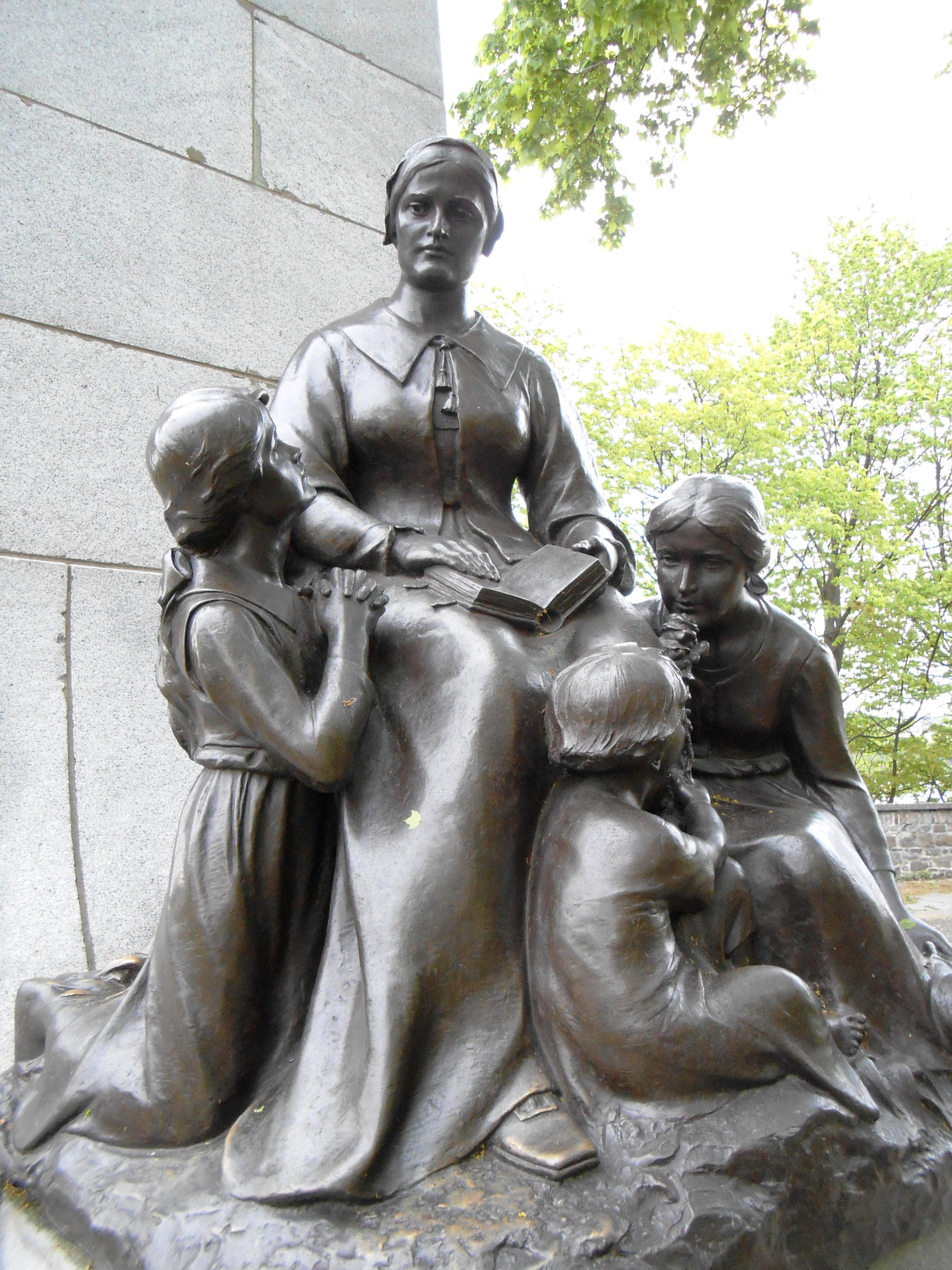
- Statue of Marie Rollet and her children at Parc Montmorency, Quebec City, Canada
- Born: Saint-Sulpice, Paris
- Died: 1649; Quebec City
- Other names: Marie Dufeu; Marie Hébert; Marie Hubou
- Occupation: Pioneer
- Known for: First female French settler in Quebec
- Spouse: Louis Hébert
- Children: Anne, Guillemette, Guillaume
- Relatives: Guillaume Couillard (son-in-law); Hélène Desportes (daughter-in-law)

Marie Rollet (died 1649) was a French woman and early settler in Quebec. Her second husband, Louis Hébert, was apothecary to Samuel Champlain's expeditions to Acadia and Quebec on 1606 and 1610–13. When she and her three surviving children traveled with her husband, Louis Hébert, to Quebec in 1617, she became the first European woman to settle in Quebec.

== Settlement of Quebec ==
Rollet married her second husband, Louis Hébert, on February 19, 1601 at the Church of Saint-Sulpice, Paris. The couple had three children: Anne, Guillaumette, and Guillaume. In 1617, the family moved to Quebec. Her eldest daughter Anne's marriage to Étienne Jonquet in 1618 was the first recorded in Quebec. While Anne died in childbirth in 1619, she left many descendants through her other two children.

Her husband died in 1627 after falling on a patch of ice, and she remarried in 1629.

Quebec was captured and occupied by British privateers in 1627, during the Anglo-French War of (1627–1629). Although the English returned many of the settlers to France, Rollet and her family, remained.

David Kirke, the leader of the English occupiers, had brought a seven year old enslaved boy from Madagascar. Kirke sold the boy to Olivier Letardif. This was the first recorded sale of an African slave in Quebec. Letardif, in turn, gave the boy to Rollet's daughter Guillemette Couillard. Rollet and Couillard arranged for the child to have some religious and practical education, and he was baptized Olivier Le Jeune, in 1633.

According to the Dictionary of Canadian Biography, Hébert routinely provided medical treatment to First Nations peoples, and the entire family had friendly ties with First Nations people. After the end of British occupation, in 1632, "her house became the home of indigenous girls given to the Jesuits for training."

== See also ==
- Guillame Couillard, her son-in-law
