= Louis Hébert =

French-Canadian apothecary and farmer

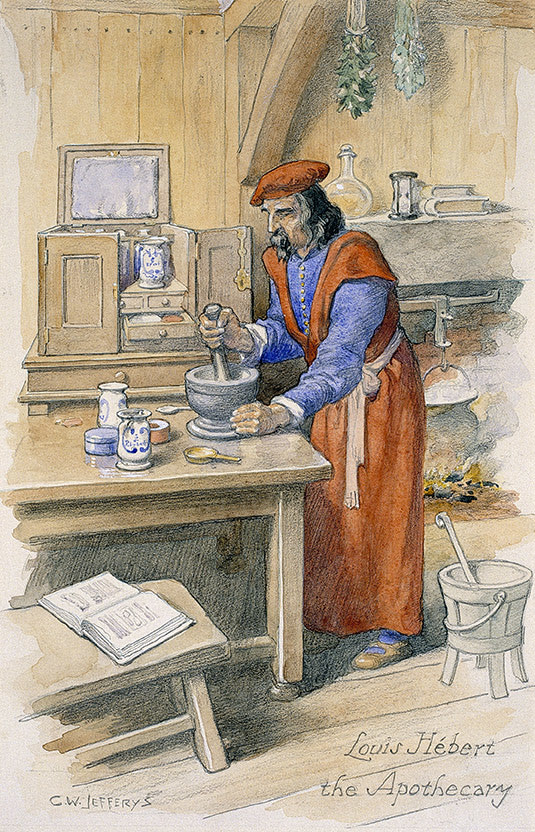
- Louis Hébert, apothecary at Port-Royal, Acadia, painted by C, W, Jefferys, collection of the National Historical site of Port-Royal.
- Born: c. 1575; Paris
- Died: 25 January 1627; Quebec
- Burial place: Vault of the Recollets, Quebec
- Monuments: Statue in Montmorency Park, Quebec City
- Occupations: Apothecary, farmer
- Known for: First European settler of New France
- Spouse: Marie Rollet
- Children: Anne, Guillemette, Guillaume
- Relatives: Guillaume Couillard (son-in-law); Hélène Desportes (daughter-in-law)

Louis Hébert (French pronunciation: [lwi ebɛʁ]; c. 1575 – 25 January 1627) is widely considered the first European apothecary in the region that would later become Canada, as well as the first European to farm in said region. He was born around 1575 at 129 de la rue Saint-Honoré in Paris to Nicolas Hébert and Jacqueline Pajot. He loved another woman, but according to his father's wish, he married Marie Rollet on February 19, 1601 at the Church of Saint-Sulpice, Paris.

In 1606, he accompanied his cousin-in-law, Jean de Biencourt de Poutrincourt et de Saint-Just, to Acadia, along with Samuel de Champlain. He lived at Port Royal (now Annapolis Royal, in southern Nova Scotia) from 1606 to 1607 and from 1611 to 1613 when the habitation at Port Royal was destroyed by the English deputy governor of Virginia Samuel Argall.

In 1617, with his wife, Marie Rollet, and their three children―Guillaume, aged three; Guillaumette, aged nine; and Anne, aged 14―he left Paris forever to live in Quebec City. He died there 10 years later due to an injury that occurred when he fell on a patch of ice.

Statues of Louis Hébert, Marie Rollet, and their children are prominent in Parc Montmorency overlooking the St. Lawrence River in Quebec City.

== Early life ==
Louis Hébert was born in Paris c. 1575, the son of Nicolas Hébert and Jacqueline Pajot. Nicolas was an apothecary with a practice in Paris. In the tradition of the day, Louis followed in his father's profession. Louis was trained in medical arts and science, becoming a specialist in pharmacology. It was from this that he developed what was to become a lifelong interest in plants and gardening. By 1600, Louis was established in Paris as an apothecary and spice merchant. In 1601, he married Marie Rollet.

== Meeting with Champlain and settling in New France ==
In 1604, Hébert's cousin, Pierre du Gua, Sieur de Monts, led an expedition to l'Île Sainte-Croix in hopes of making a fortune in the fur trade. The expedition's first winter was very hard. There was a shortage of fresh water and firewood, and 36 of the 80 expedition members died of scurvy. In the following summer of 1605, the expedition relocated across the bay at Port-Royal (today known as Annapolis Royal, Nova Scotia).

In 1606, Louis joined the expedition, now located at Port-Royal. As a pharmacist, he was interested in plants and enjoyed horticulture, seeming to possess a "green thumb", growing hemp and other plants. He was highly regarded, and particular note was made of his knowledge and pleasure in cultivating the land. He participated in the construction of a grist-mill on the Allain River near present-day Annapolis Royal. Experimental farming activities were conducted, with various grains seeded in the local fields. He looked after the health of the pioneers, and cultivated native drug plants introduced to him by the Mi'kmaq people. He returned to France in 1607, after the trade concession that had been granted to the de Monts expedition had expired.

In 1610, Hébert returned to Port-Royal with Jean de Biencourt de Poutrincourt. It has been claimed that a few months later his wife joined him and became one of the first French women to come to New France, but the claim has not been documented. Louis continued his agricultural interests, sowing wheat and planting vines. The colony at Port-Royal seemed to take root, but in 1613 it was destroyed by the English coming up from Virginia. The French colonists returned to France, and Louis established a medical practice and apothecary shop (pharmacy) in Paris.

At this time, Quebec was a settlement of some fifty white men who were all transient soldiers, fur trappers, or missionaries. The economy of the settlement was dependent on some 20,000 beaver pelts that were annually returned to French merchants in exchange for supplies. The "Compagnie du Canada", made up of merchants from Rouen, St-Malo, and La Rochelle, had a trading monopoly that controlled the fur trade in Quebec.

Champlain, who founded Quebec in 1608, saw a desperate need for medical service and agricultural self-sufficiency for Quebec. Champlain had met Louis Hébert during the earlier expedition to Port-Royal, and had recognised Louis' outstanding qualities. Champlain approached Louis with an offer from the "Compagnie du Canada". He had met Louis when they were both in Acadia. They mutually respected each other.

=== Compagnie du Canada and permanent settlement in Quebec ===
Champlain spent the winter of 1616–1617 in Paris searching for support for his colony of Quebec. Hébert was allured, believing there would be promising opportunities for him in the St. Lawrence Valley. The Compagnie du Canada made Hébert an offer: If he would take his family to Quebec for three years and practice medicine in the settlement and establish farming, the company would pay him an annual salary of 600 livres (pounds) and grant him ten acres of land at the settlement on which to build his house and farm. Louis agreed to the terms and signed the contract.

Louis sold his practice and his home, and proceeded with his wife, son, and two daughters to the port of Honfleur, France. When he arrived, Louis was told by the ship's master that instructions from the Compagnie du Canada were that they could only board if Louis agreed to sign a new contract with the company. The new provision reduced his annual salary to 300 livres per year, required him to serve as the physician and surgeon at the settlement, and required him to farm ten acres of land and give the company exclusive right to buy all of his agricultural products at the prevailing price in France. Having already sold his house and left his practice, Louis reluctantly accepted and signed the new contract.

On April 11, 1617, Hébert and his family left Honfleur aboard the Saint-Étienne (captained by Normand Morin) and arrived in Quebec on 15 July. Only five other French families were to follow them on similar voyages to New France in the next 10 years.

In the spring of 1617 Louis became the first private individual to receive a grant of land in the New World from the French government.

Upon his arrival in Quebec, Louis selected ten acres on a site that is today located in the city of Quebec between Ste-Famille and Couillard Streets, on the grounds of the Seminary of Quebec and Basilica of Notre-Dame. Soon afterwards, Louis started clearing out some old-growth forest so he could plant crops. This put him in conflict with the fur trading company, who was strongly opposed to deforestation for farming because of its adverse effect on the fur business. Louis had to work very hard, doing all the work by hand. The fur trading company would not let him import a plough from France. On this land, Louis, his son Guillaume, and an unnamed servant with the help of only an axe, a pick and a spade, broke the soil and raised corn, winter wheat, beans, peas, and livestock including cattle, swine, and fowl. He also established an apple orchard and a vineyard.

In 1621, his daughter Guillemette married Guillaume Couillard, who joined the family business.

By 1620, Louis' hard work was finally recognized as having been of great service to the colony: for being the physician and surgeon; for being its principal provider of food; and for having fostered good relationships with the natives. He was appointed Procurator to the King, which allowed him to personally intervene in matters in the name of the King.

In 1623, Louis became the first "Seigneur" of New France when he was granted the fief of "Sault-au-Matelot". In 1626 he was further granted "le fief de la rivière St-Charles" in recognition of his meritorious service.

== Death ==
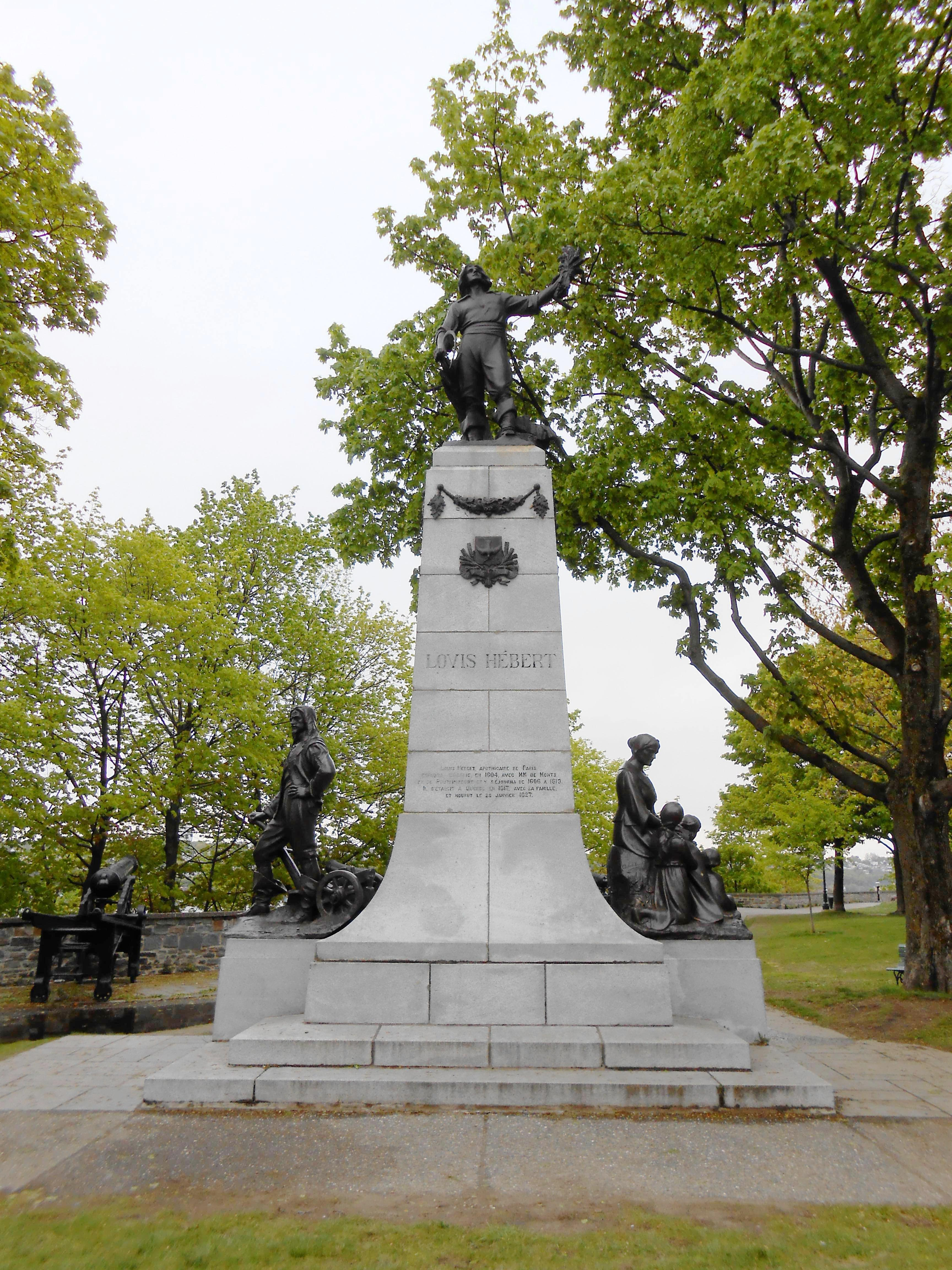
Hébert's monument at Montmorency Park in Quebec City

Louis died on January 25, 1627, from injuries suffered after slipping on ice. The colony held a funeral for its first colonist. Louis was as respected by the Native Americans as he was by the other Frenchmen. He was first buried in the cemetery of the Recollets, but in 1678 his remains inside his cedar coffin were transported to the newly built vault of the Recollets (the Franciscans) with the remains of brother Pacifique Duplessis. Hébert was the first to be laid to rest in this new structure.

== Descendants ==
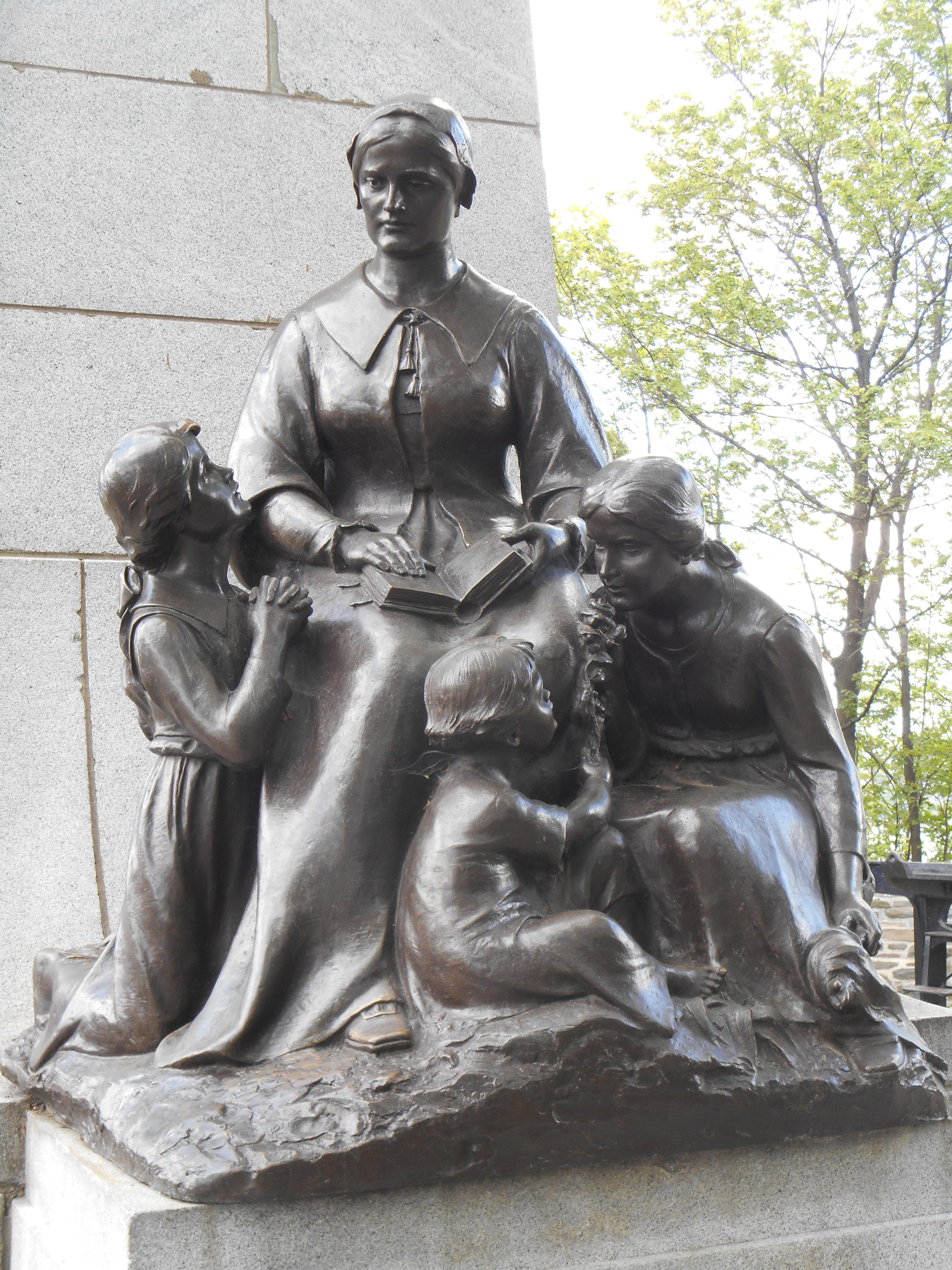
Marie Rollet and her children

Louis Hébert and Marie Rollet had two daughters, Anne and Guillaumette, and one son, Guillaume. Guillaume married Hélène Desportes, said to be the first white child born in New France. Guillaume and Hélène had a daughter, Françoise Hébert, and a son, Joseph, who married Marie-Charlotte de Poytiers in 1660. Joseph and Marie-Charlotte had a single son, also named Joseph, in 1661, born while his father was captured and killed by the Iroquois. As there is no further mention of this boy, he is presumed to have died as a small child, and there were no other children.

Granddaughter Françoise Hébert married Guillaume Fournier, which ended the surname Hébert descended from Louis. However, some descendants of Louis Hébert and Marie Rollet may also share the name Hébert through marriage of female descendants with other men named Hébert, as there were several other male Hébert immigrants to New France or Acadia with male descendants.

As their first child, Anne, died in her first pregnancy, the descendants of Louis Hébert and his wife Marie Rollet arise from their second child, Guillaumette, and her husband Guillaume Couillard; or from their granddaughter Françoise Hébert (child of son Guillaume) and her husband Guillaume Fournier.

At the beginning of 1800, Louis Hébert and Marie Rollet had 4,592 descendants married in Quebec, according to the PRDH (Historical Demography Research Program) of the Université de Montréal, making the couple the tenth most important one in French-Canadian ancestry at that time. Given the migratory routes of French-Canadians, their descendants thus live mainly in Canada (especially Quebec, Ontario and Manitoba), but also in communities in New England, upstate New York, and the Midwest (especially Michigan, Missouri, Illinois, Minnesota) also in Montana.

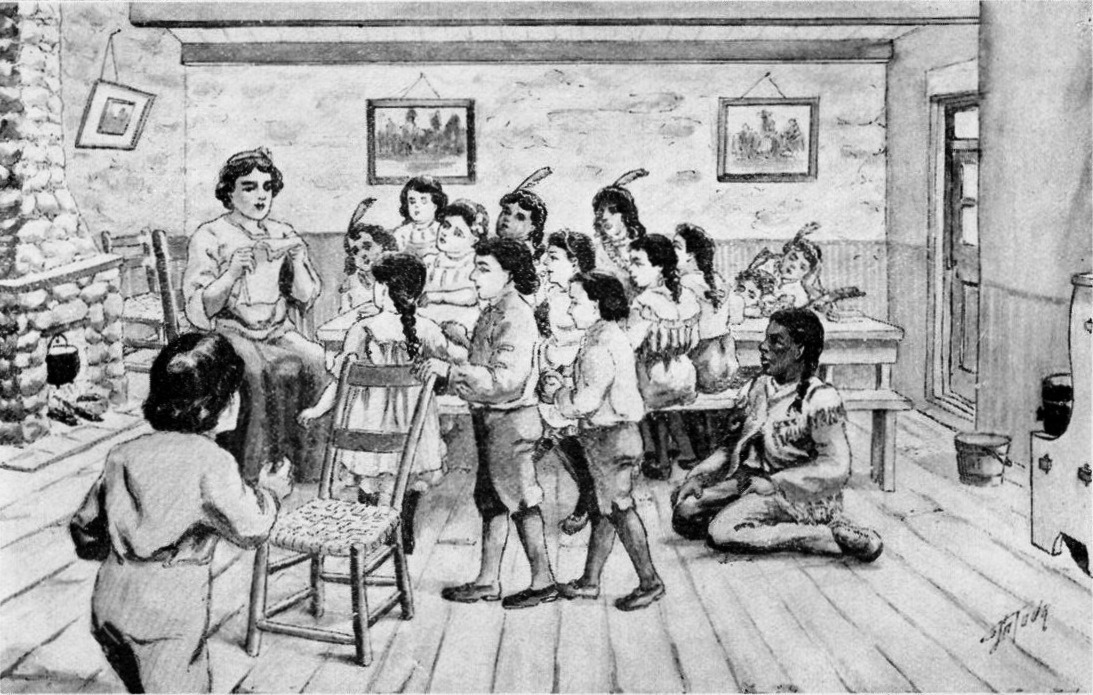
Madame Hebért teaching

=== Notable descendants ===
Hébert and Marie Rollet have a number of notable descendants, including:

- Carolyn Bessette Kennedy
- Justin Bieber
- Céline Dion
- Shania Twain
- Madonna Ciccone
- Jack Kerouac
- Alex Trebek
- Chris Pratt
- Justin Theroux
- Hillary Clinton
- Ricky Gervais
- Jim Carrey
- Nathan Fillion
- Camilla, Queen of the United Kingdom
- Alanis Morissette

== Lasting recognition in Canada ==
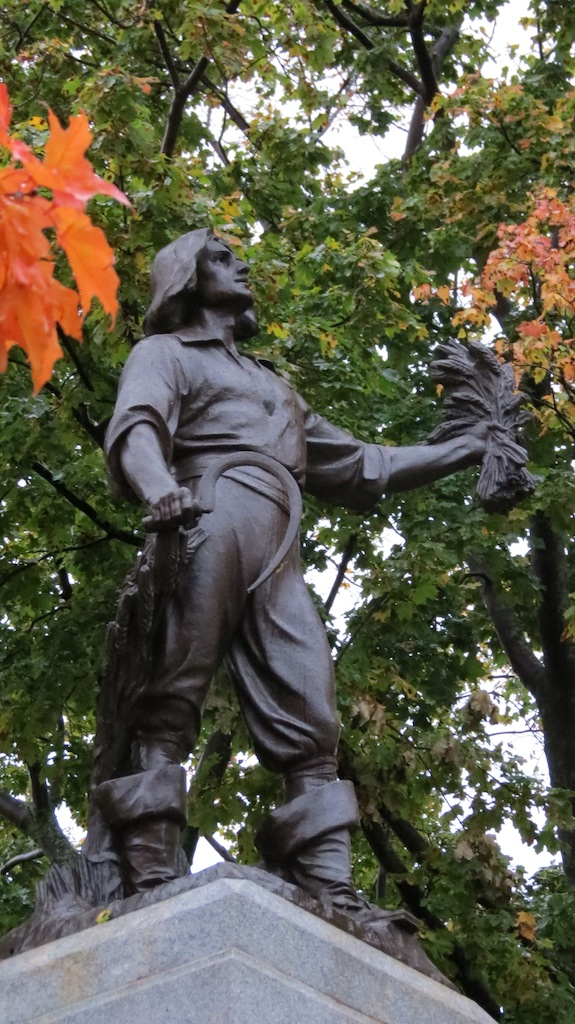
Detail of statue atop memorial

Hébert overcame the hardships and became the first European in the territory that would later become Canada to support his family from the soil. He imported from France the first ox to pull a plough in Canada, but unfortunately, the first plough did not arrive until a year after his death.

Jacques Lacoursière noted that Hébert had many firsts. He was the first colonist of Quebec, first colonist to live off the land, his daughter Anne's marriage to Étienne Jonquet in 1617 was the first in New France, and he was the first lord of New France.

When English corsairs David Kirke and his brothers took possession of Quebec, Hébert's family did not leave, but waited out the three years until Quebec was returned to France.

Marie Rollet quietly remarried, to Guillaume Hubou, two years after Louis' death. After the three year occupation by the English, Champlain asked her to move to Quebec and Louis' house became a residence for Native youth entrusted to the Jesuits for their education.

There is a monument to Louis Hébert in Parc Montmorency that symbolises the importance of Louis Hébert and his family in the beginnings of Quebec. On top is Louis Hébert holding a sheaf of grain (wheat or barley) in one hand and a sickle in the other. On one side of the base, Marie Rollet clasps her three children in her arms. On the other, son-in-law Guillaume Couillard has a plough in hand.

The 2015 song "Louis Hébert" by Québécois neo-trad/folk band Les Cowboys Fringants pays tribute to Hébert.

== Bibliography ==
- Goulet, George; Goulet, Terry (2007). Louis Hébert and Marie Rollet, Canada's Premier Pioneers. FabJob, Calgary. ISBN 978-1-897286-15-9. A history of Canada's first permanent colonial settlers.
