= Guillaume Couillard (settler) =

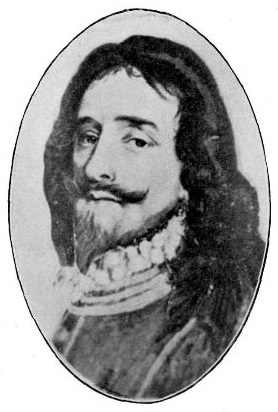
- Born: 11 October 1588; Saint-Servan-sur-Mer, Bretagne, France
- Died: 4 March 1663 (aged 74); Quebec City, Canada
- Spouse: Marie-Guillemette Hébert (m. 1621–1663; his death)
- Relatives: Louis Hébert (father-in-law); Marie Rollet (mother-in-law); Hélène Desportes (sister-in-law)

Guillaume Couillard (11 October 1588 – 4 March 1663) was a 17th-century French emigrant to New France (part of which became today's Canada) and was one of its settlers.

== Early life ==
Couillard was born in 1588 to Andre Couillard and Jehanne Basset. He emigrated to New France in 1613 and began working as a carpenter and sailor for a band of merchants.

== Personal life ==
In 1621, Couillard married Marie-Guillemette Hébert, with whom he had ten known children. He was knighted by Louis XIV in December 1654, an honour which was also later bestowed on his sons Charles and Louis.

== Death ==
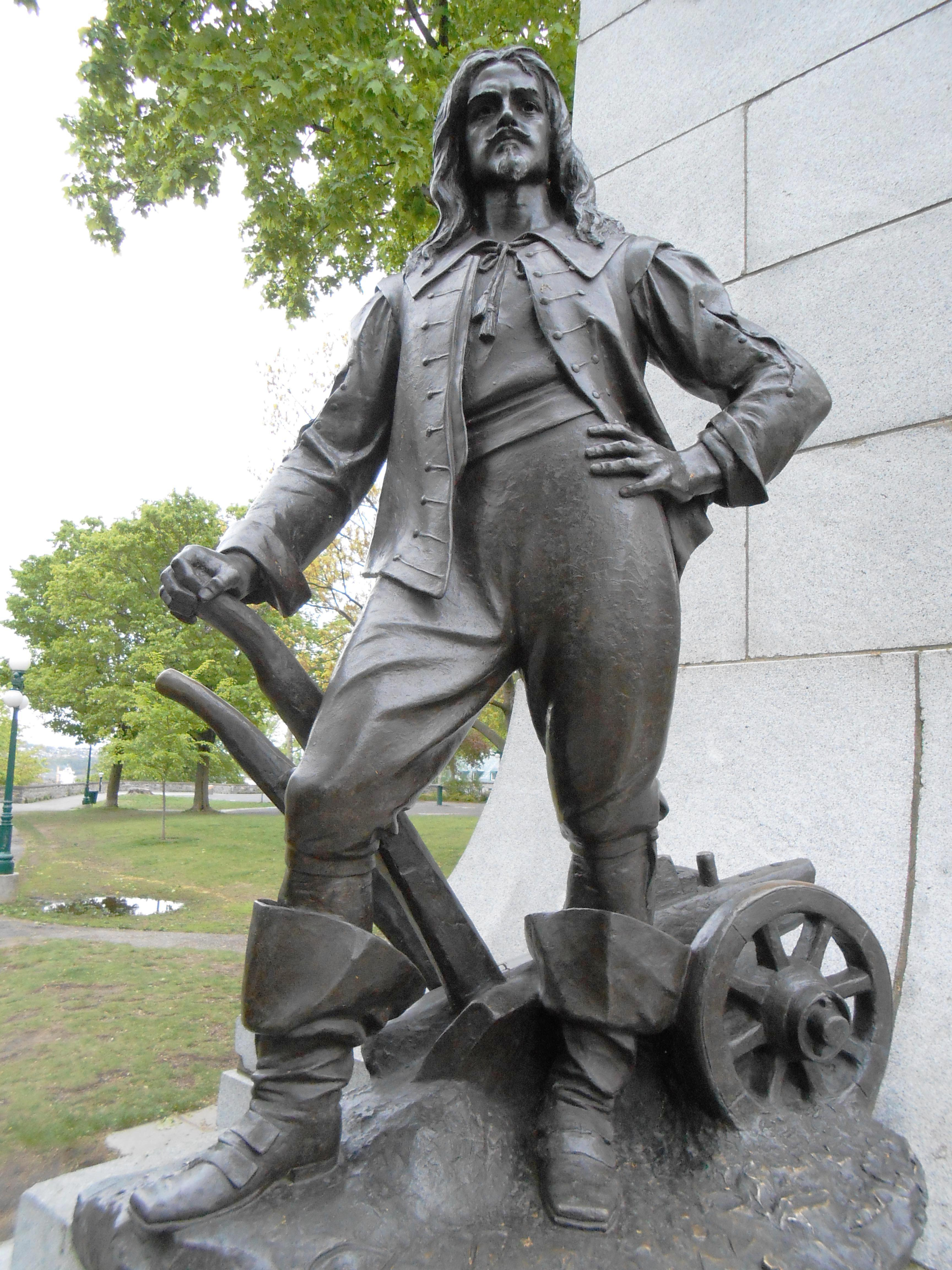
Couillard's statue

Couillard died at his home in Quebec City in 1663, aged 74. He was interred in the chapel of Quebec's Hotel-Dieu. His widow survived him by 21 years and was buried beside him upon her death.

=== Legacy ===
A statue of Couillard stands in Parc Montmorency, Quebec City, beside one of his father-in-law, Louis Hébert, and mother-in-law, Marie Rollet.
