= Goulet =

Goulet may refer to:

== Surname ==
- Alfred Goulet (1875−1961), Canadian businessman and political figure
- Bertrand Goulet (born 1944), Member of the National Assembly of Quebec
- Brent Goulet (born 1964), American soccer player
- Catherine Goulet, Canadian author and publishing entrepreneur
- Danis Goulet (born 1977), Canadian Cree-Métis film director and screenwriter
- Denis Goulet (1931–2006), scholar of human development and development ethics
- Elzéar Goulet (1836−1870), Metis martyr
- Émilius Goulet (born 1933), Roman Catholic Archbishop of St. Boniface in Manitoba, Canada
- Florence Goulet (born 1961), French politician
- George R. D. Goulet (born 1933), Canadian author and lawyer
- Genny Goulet (born 1980), French-Canadian professional wrestler who uses the ring name LuFisto
- Jacques Goulet (1615−1688), Canadian pioneer and miller
- Jason Goulet (born 1983), Canadian professional ice hockey defenceman
- Jonathan Goulet (born 1979), Canadian martial artist
- Keith Goulet (born 1946), Canadian politician, first aboriginal person appointed to the Executive Council of Saskatchewan
- Maxime Goulet (1855−1932), Canadian politician
- Michel Goulet (born 1944), Canadian sculptor and professor at Université du Québec
- Michel Goulet (born 1960), professional ice hockey player
- Mickey Goulet (born 1947), French Olympic coach
- Nathalie Goulet (born 1958), French politician
- Nicolette Goulet (1956–2008), Canadian-American film, television and musical theatre actress
- Paul Goulet (born 1958), pastor and author
- Perrine Goulet (born 1978), French politician representing La République En Marche!
- Rita Goulet (born 1983), American auto racing driver
- Robert Goulet (1933−2007), American singer, actor
- Robert L. Goulet, sports agent
- Tag Goulet, Canadian author and publishing entrepreneur
- Terry Goulet (born 1934), Canadian author
- Tim Goulet (born 1981), American stock car racing driver
- Yann Goulet (1914−1999), Breton nationalist and sculptor

== Places ==
- Le Goulet, New Brunswick, a village in New Brunswick, Canada
- Goulet, Orne, a commune in northwestern France
- Goulet Bluff, a point on the western side of the Peron Peninsula in the Shark Bay World Heritage Site
- Goulet de Brest, sea-channel into the roadstead of Brest
- Goulet River (disambiguation)

== Other uses ==
- Treaty of Le Goulet, treaty signed by Kings John of England and Philip II of France in May 1200
