= Gullett =

Gullett is a surname. Notable people with the surname include:

- Don Gullett (1951–2024), American baseball player
- Henry Gullett (1878–1940), Australian journalist and politician
- Henry Gullett (New South Wales politician) (1837–1914), Australian journalist and politician
- Jo Gullett (1914–1999), Australian soldier, politician, diplomat and journalist
- Joseph Gullett (born 1980), American politician
- Lucy Gullett, (1876–1949), Australian medical practitioner and philanthropist
- William W. Gullett (1922–2015), first County Executive of Prince George's County, Maryland, US

== See also ==
- Benjamin D. Gullett House, historic structure in Eutaw, Alabama
- Gallet (disambiguation)
- Gillet
- Gillett (disambiguation)
- Gillette (disambiguation)
- Goulet (disambiguation)
- Guillet
- Gullit
