= Gallet =

Gallet may refer to:

== People with the surname ==
- Anne Gallet, a Swiss harpsichordist and musicologist
- Charles Gallet (1875-1951), French politician
- Léon Gallet (1832–1899), watchmaker and philanthropist, patriarch of the Gallet Watch Company
- Louis Gallet (1835–1898), a French writer of operatic libretti, plays, romances, memoirs, pamphlets
- Luciano Gallet (1893–1931), a Brazilian composer, conductor and pianist
- Mathieu Gallet (born 1977), French high-ranking civil servant

== Other ==
- Gallet & Co., a historic Swiss watch and clock manufacturer
- Air Gallet, a vertically scrolling shoot 'em up arcade game developed by Gazelle
- Gallet Clamshell, the world's first water resistant chronograph wristwatch
- Gallet Flight Officer, the world's first time zone calculating wristwatch
- CGF Gallet, a French company producer of the SPECTRA combat helmet and the F1 helmet for firemen
- Le Gallet, a commune in the Oise department in northern France
- small splinters of stone inserted in the joints of coarse masonry to protect the mortar joints : see Glossary of architecture
