= George R. D. Goulet =

Canadian Métis scholar

George R. D. Goulet, 2007.

George Richard Donald Goulet is a Canadian Métis author, historian, Métis Scholar, activist, retired lawyer, and recipient of the Queen Elizabeth II Diamond Jubilee Medal.

== Life ==
George was born on September 27, 1933, in Saint Boniface, Manitoba, as the fifth of 8 children to George Wilfrid Goulet and Marie Alexina Laura McDougall, a granddaughter of Pierre Delorme. He counts amongst his ancestors early French Canadian settlers Louis Hébert, Jean Guyon du Buisson, and Zacharie Cloutier, in addition to political figure Alexander MacDonell of Greenefield and John Siveright, Chief Factor of the Hudson's Bay Company. He is the father of five children including Tag Goulet, Laura de Jonge, Catherine Goulet and John McDougall-Goulet.

George attended St. Paul's High School in Winnipeg. He holds a Bachelor of Arts degree from the University of Manitoba, a Bachelor of Laws degree from the University of Manitoba Law School, and a Master of Laws degree from the University of Toronto. The admissions guide for the University of Toronto lists George as one of four distinguished alumni along with Astronaut Roberta Bondar, Sociologist Daniel G Hill and Simon Cooper, former president and COO of the Ritz-Carlton Hotel Company.

== Career ==
George is the author of several historical books including The Trial of Louis Riel: Justice and Mercy Denied, The Metis: Memorable Events and Memorable Personalities, and Louis Hebert and Marie Rollet: Canada's Premier Pioneers, the latter two with his wife Terry Goulet as co-author. Together, they have spoken at numerous schools, universities, libraries, and public events, including at the Manitoba Pavilion during the 2010 Winter Olympics in Vancouver. In the spring of 2012, they spoke at the Centre of Canadian Studies at the University of Edinburgh and at the British Association of Canadian Studies conference on Sustaining Canada at Murray Edwards College at the University of Cambridge where they gave a talk on the Aboriginal rights of the Métis in relation to the Enbridge Northern Gateway Pipelines.

In 2007, George and his wife Terry were commissioned by the Metis Nation of British Columbia to write a book about the history of the Métis people within British Columbia in honour of the BC 150 celebration. The book, The Metis in British Columbia: From Fur Trade Outposts to Colony, was officially released at the Annual General Meeting of the Métis Nation of British Columbia in September 2008. The two were also the Historical Consultants to the BC Metis Federation.

Also in September 2008, George was one of the featured speakers at the commemoration of the Elzéar Goulet Memorial Park in Saint Boniface, as George is a great-grand-nephew of the eponymous Métis martyr.

An annual scholarship, the George and Terry Goulet Bursary in Canadian History, was established at the University of Calgary in their honor.

=== Advocacy ===
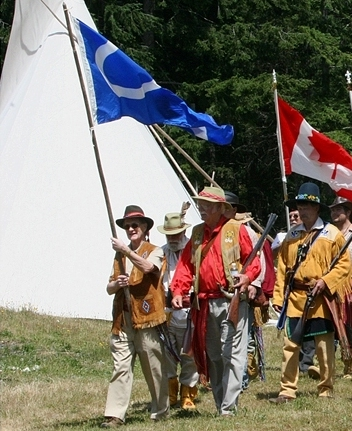
George R. D. Goulet, 2007 (shown carrying the Métis Flag) and leading the Grand Entry at the Red River West celebration.

The Okotoks Western Wheel newspaper has referred to George and Terry Goulet as "Experts on Louis Riel". The two are strong supporters of the exoneration of Louis Riel; George has been quoted on his support of the Private member's bill introduced by Pat Martin in the House of Commons. In May 2011 in a National Post article, in which Martin argues that Riel was a hero and not a traitor, Martin refers to Goulet's book title in that Riel's execution was "a case of both justice and mercy denied."

In October 2012, George and Terry spoke before a Standing Committee of the Senate of Canada to examine and report on the legal and political recognition of Métis identity in Canada.

George and Terry are also staunch supporters of the Declaration on the Rights of Indigenous Peoples and published a paper in April 2018 titled: "Requirements for Recognition and Implementation of Indigenous Rights Framework" arguing for the Canadian government to uphold the declaration.

== Select bibliography ==
- 1994. Public share offerings and stock exchange listings in Canada: going public, staying public, getting listed, staying listed. North York: CCH.
- 1999. The Trial of Louis Riel: Justice and Mercy Denied. Calgary: Tellwell.
- 2005. Prostate Cancer Treatment and Healing. Calgary: FabJob.
- 2006. The Métis: Memorable Events and Memorable Personalities. Calgary: FabJob.
- 2007. Louis Hébert and Marie Rollet: Canada's Premier Pioneers. Calgary: FabJob.
- 2008. The Métis in British Columbia: From Fur Trade Outposts to Colony. Calgary: FabJob.
- 2022. Along the Métis Trail: Métis history, heritage, and culture. Calgary: IAPCC.

== See also ==
- List of Canadian historians
- Notable Aboriginal people of Canada
