= Terry Goulet =

Canadian historian and biographer

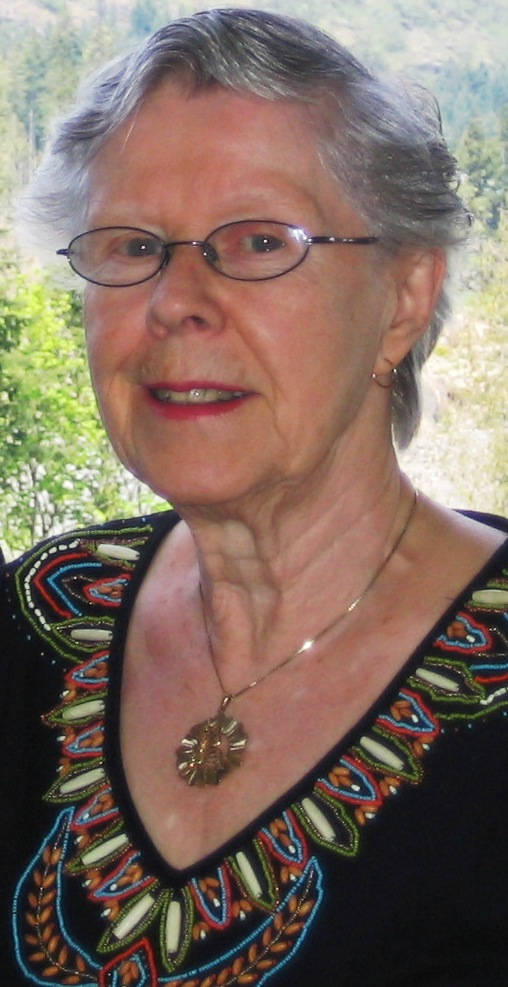
- Terry Goulet in 2008
- Born: September 26, 1934 (age 91)
- Other name: Marie Therese Veronica "Terry" Goulet
- Occupation: Author

Marie Therese “Terry” Goulet is a Canadian historian who has written and spoken extensively on the subject of the Canadian aboriginal group the Métis. With her husband George who is Métis, Goulet has been an advocate for Métis identity in Canada and for the exoneration of early Canadian and Métis politician Louis Riel. In January 2018, Goulet was honored as an “exemplary citizen” by the Canadian government.

== Biography ==
Marie Therese Veronica "Terry" Goulet, née Boyer de la Giroday (born September 26, 1934) is a Canadian best-selling author, historian, activist, and public speaker with a special interest in the Métis Nation. She is married to George R. D. Goulet, Métis author, and mother of five children including Tag Goulet, Laura de Jonge, Catherine Goulet and John McDougall-Goulet.

Born in Calgary, Alberta, Goulet studied at the University of Manitoba receiving a BSc (HEc) degree. She had an eclectic career working as a paralegal and a free-lance indexer of corporate and securities law reporters for CCH. Along with her husband George, Goulet has spoken to thousands of people across North America on Louis Riel and the Métis, including at the Manitoba Pavilion during the 2010 Winter Olympics in Vancouver. In the spring of 2012 they spoke at the Centre of Canadian Studies at the University of Edinburgh, and at the British Association of Canadian Studies conference on Sustaining Canada at Murray Edwards College at the University of Cambridge, where they gave a talk on the aboriginal rights of the Métis in relation to the Enbridge Northern Gateway Pipelines.

Goulet and her husband George contributed expert information about Louis Riel to the CBC series Canada: a People's History, and they were the historical consultants to the British Columbia Métis Federation.

In September 2006, Goulet was a member of a round table discussion at a conference in Winnipeg to commemorate the centennial of Gabriel Dumont's death.

An annual scholarship, the George and Terry Goulet Bursary in Canadian History, was established at the University of Calgary in their honor.

Terry, along with her husband George, is a strong supporter of the exoneration of Louis Riel and has been quoted on her support of the Private member's bill introduced by Pat Martin in the House of Commons. The Okotoks Western Wheel newspaper has referred to George and Terry Goulet as "Experts on Louis Riel".

In October 2012, Terry and George spoke before a Standing Committee of the Senate of Canada to examine and report on the legal and political recognition of Métis identity in Canada.

Longtime supporters of the Declaration on the Rights of Indigenous Peoples, in April 2018 Terry and George published a paper titled: “Requirements for Recognition and Implementation of Indigenous Rights Framework” arguing for the Canadian government to uphold the declaration.

Goulet, along with 19 others, was awarded a special edition Canada 150 pin in recognition as an "exemplary citizen". The pin, which was made from reclaimed copper of the House of Commons of Canada, was presented by Member of Parliament Pamela Goldsmith-Jones in a ceremony in January, 2018.

== Select bibliography ==
- Along the Métis Trail: Métis history, heritage, and culture. Calgary: IAPCC, 2022.
- Louis Hebert and Marie Rollet: Canada's Premier Pioneers. Calgary: FabJob, 2007.
- The Metis: Memorable Events and Memorable Personalities. Calgary: FabJob, 2006.
- The Metis in British Columbia: From Fur Trade Outposts to Colony. Calgary: FabJob, 2008.
- Prostate Cancer Treatment and Healing. Calgary: FabJob, 2005.
- The Trial of Louis Riel: Justice and Mercy Denied (Researcher). Calgary: Tellwell, 1999.
- 2022. Along the Métis Trail: Métis history, heritage, and culture. Calgary: IAPCC.

== See also ==
- List of Canadian historians
