= Clamshell =

Clamshell may denote anything resembling the bivalve shell of a clam:

- Scoop stretcher, another name for this patient transport device
- Clamshell design, a form factor used for electronic devices, also known as a "flip" or "flip phone".
- Clamshell (container), a design used for storage and food packaging, usually made of plastic or paperboard.
- Clamshell case, a type of box for storing paper items in archives (may also refer to either of the two uses above - electronics or packaging)
- Gallet Clamshell, the world's first water resistant chronograph wristwatch
- Bucket (machine part)#Clamshell bucket, or clamshell bucket
- Clamshell Alliance, an anti-nuclear organization
- Clamshell Falls, a waterfall in Australia
- Laptop, a type of personal computer
