= Monts-sur-Orne =

- Commune
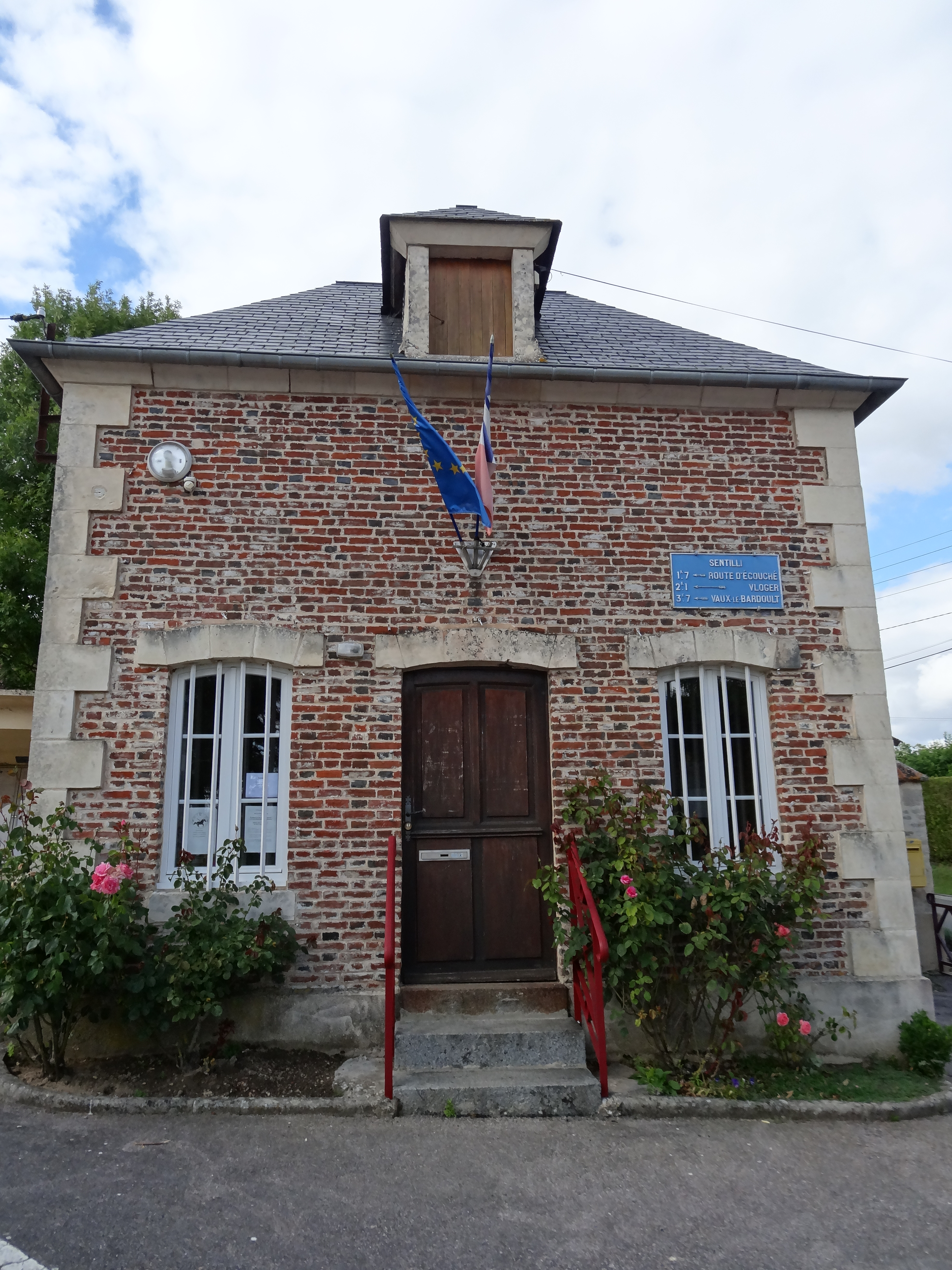
- Town hall
- Location of Monts-sur-Orne
- Location within France Location within Normandy
- Coordinates: 48°44′01″N 0°05′30″W
- Country: France
- Region: Normandy
- Department: Orne
- Arrondissement: Argentan
- Canton: Magny-le-Désert
- Intercommunality: Terres d'Argentan Interco

Government
  - Mayor (2020–2026): Gilles Mallet
- Area^{1}: 30.90 km^{2} (11.93 sq mi)
- Population (2023): 874
  - Density: 28.3/km^{2} (73.3/sq mi)
- Time zone: UTC+01:00 (CET)
  - Summer (DST): UTC+02:00 (CEST)
- INSEE/Postal code: 61194 /61150
- ^{1} French Land Register data, which excludes lakes, ponds, glaciers > 1 km^{2} (0.386 sq mi or 247 acres) and river estuaries.

Monts-sur-Orne (French pronunciation: [mɔ̃ syʁ ɔʁn]) is a commune in the department of Orne, northwestern France. The municipality was established on 1 January 2018 by merger of the former communes of Goulet (the seat), Montgaroult and Sentilly.

== Population ==
The former commune of Sentilly had a 2019 population of 128.

== Geography ==
The commune is made up of the following collection of villages and hamlets, Goulet, Pommereux, Montgaroult, Sentilly, Vaux le Bardoult, Fontaine and Vloger. It also borders the area known as Suisse Normande.

The commune is within the area known as the Plaine d'Argentan, which is known for its cereal growing fields and horse stud farms.

Monts-sur-Orne along with another 65 communes is part of a 20,593 hectare, Natura 2000 conservation area, called the Haute vallée de l'Orne et affluents.

The commune has two rivers running through it, the Orne and one of its tributaries the Houay.

== Points of Interest ==
- Carrière des Monts is a Sensitive Natural Space of Orne covering an area of 2 hectares. The site, in Sentilly is a former Limestone quarry, that makes a suitable home for many insects, attracted by the Thyme and Oregano that grows there.

== National Heritage sites ==
The Commune has three buildings and areas listed as a Monument historique.

- Servin Cross is a 13th-century Wayside cross located in Goulet that was listed as a Monument historique in 1955.
- Vaux-le-Bardoult Church is a 14th Century Church located in Vaux le Bardoult that was registered as a Monument in 1972.
- Manoir de Pommereux is a 15th Century manor house located in Pommereux that was listed as a Monument historique in 1926.
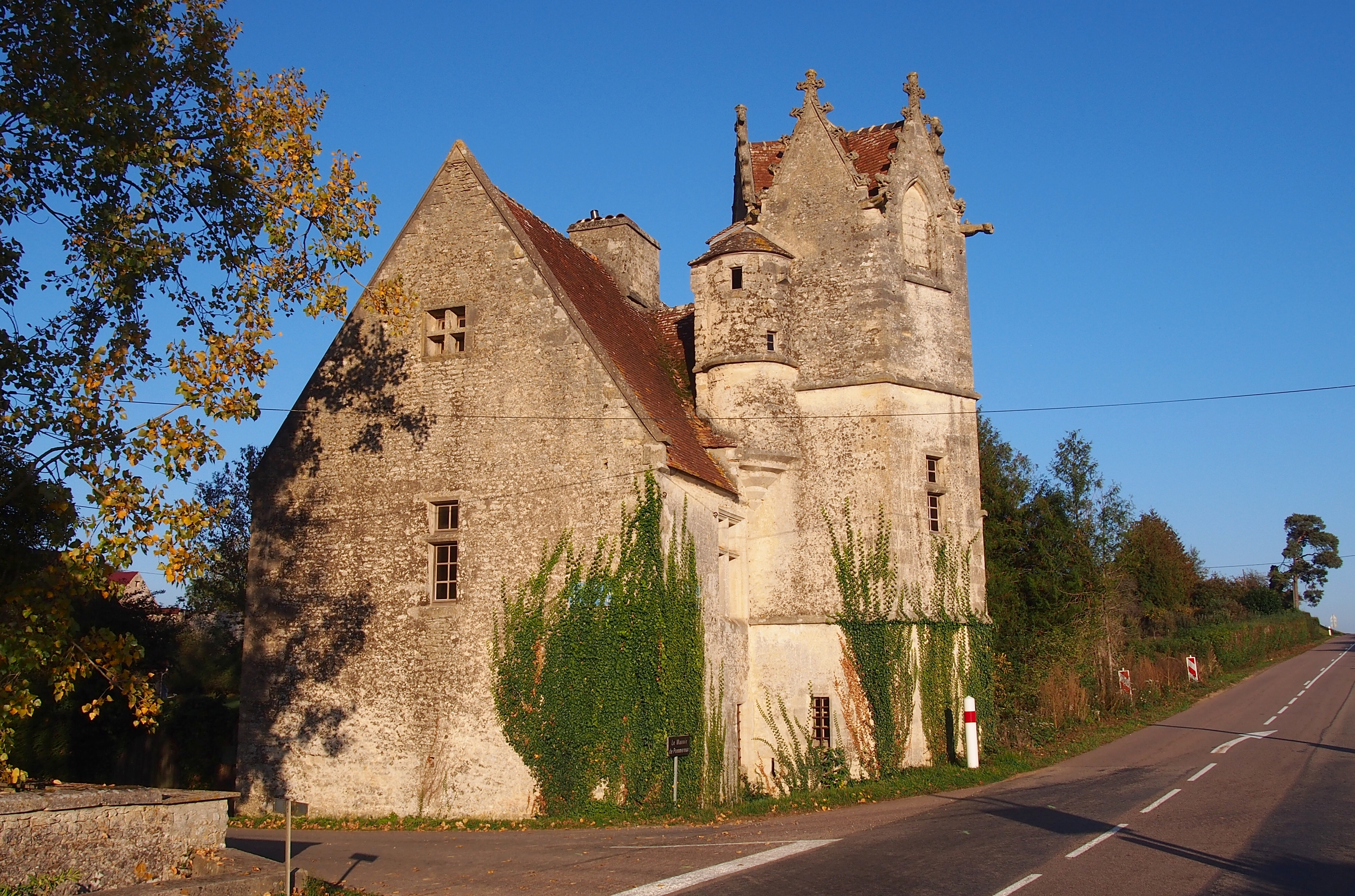
Manoir de Pommereux

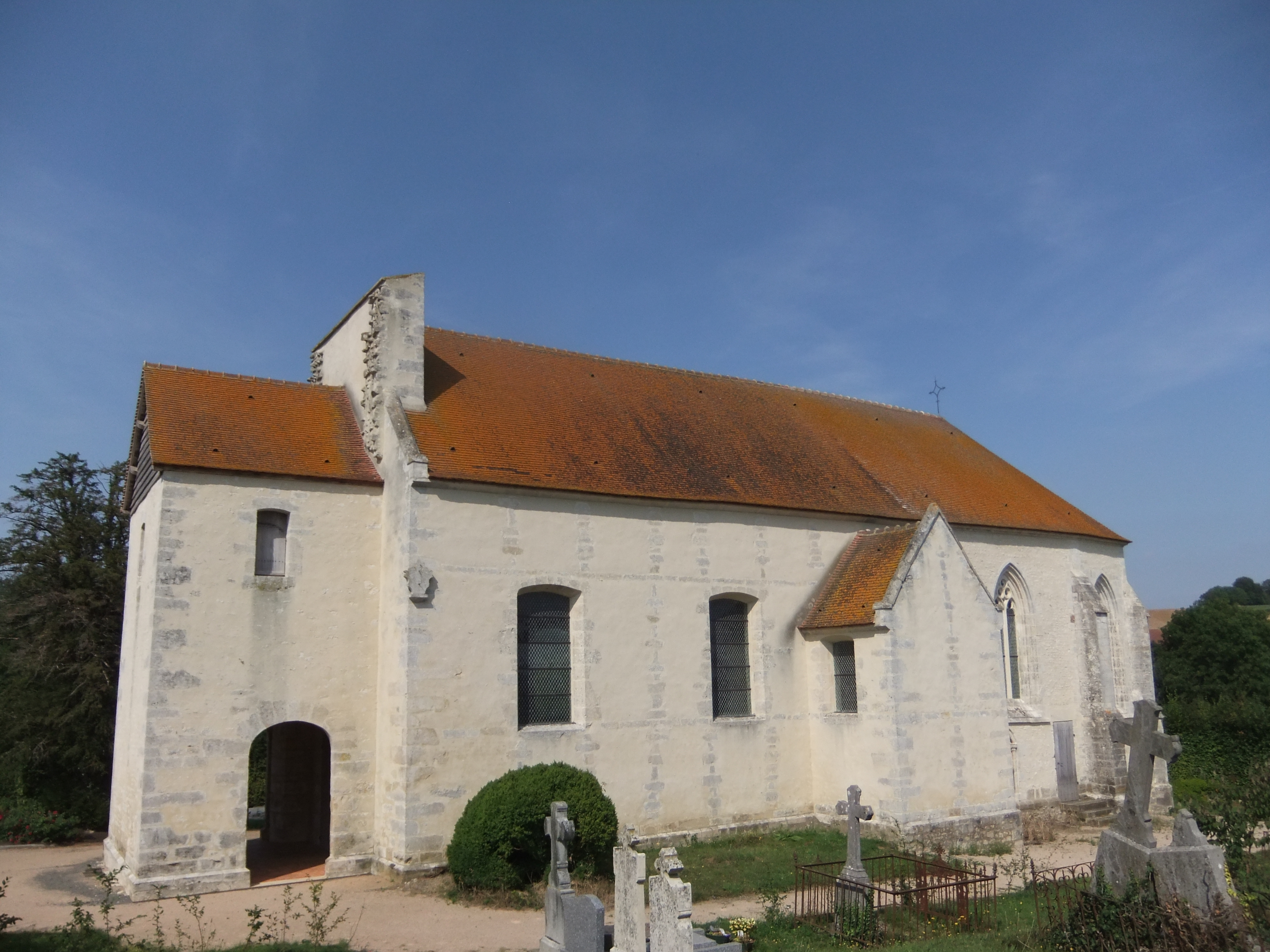
Vaux-le-Bardoult church

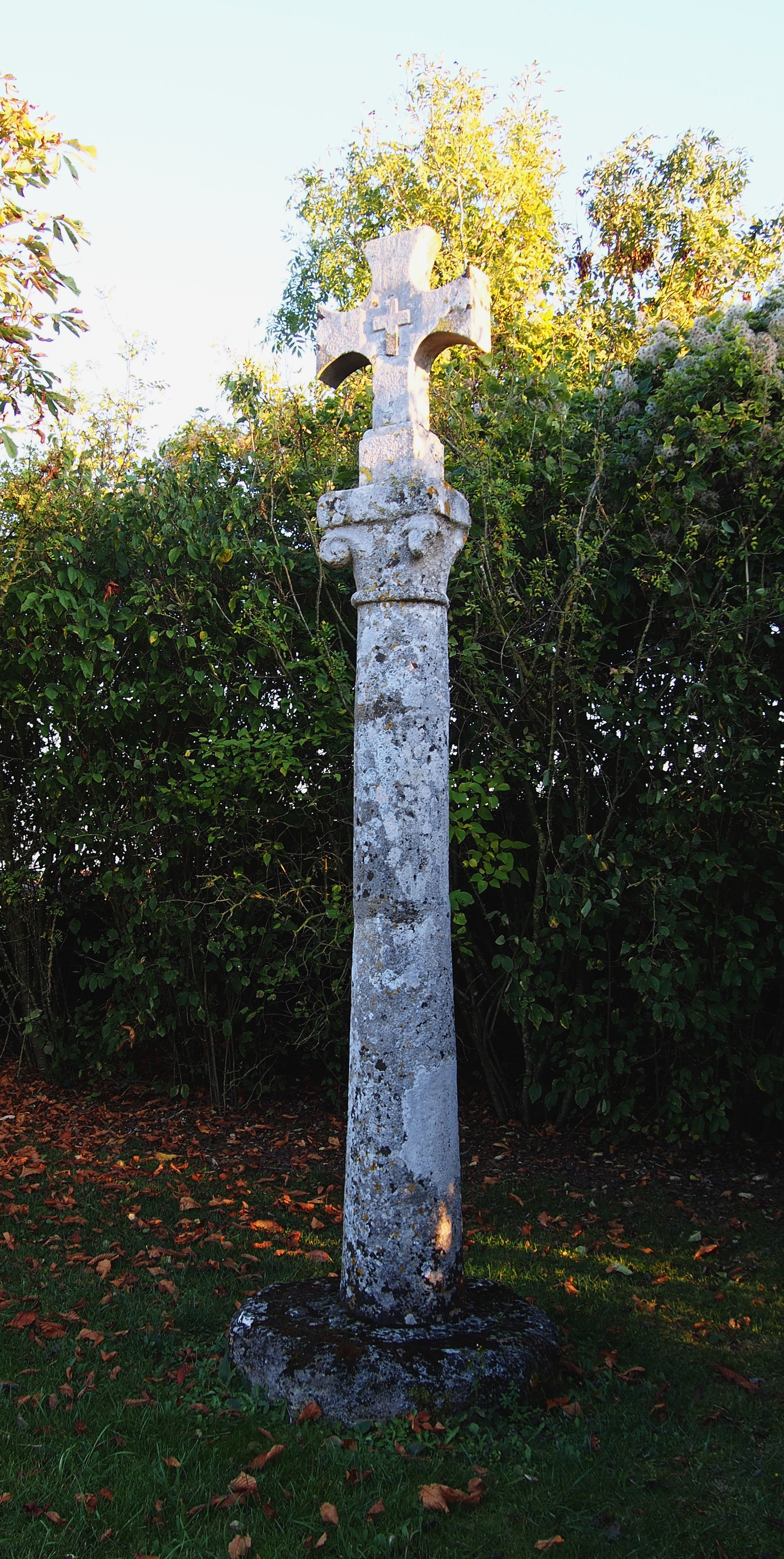
Servin Cross

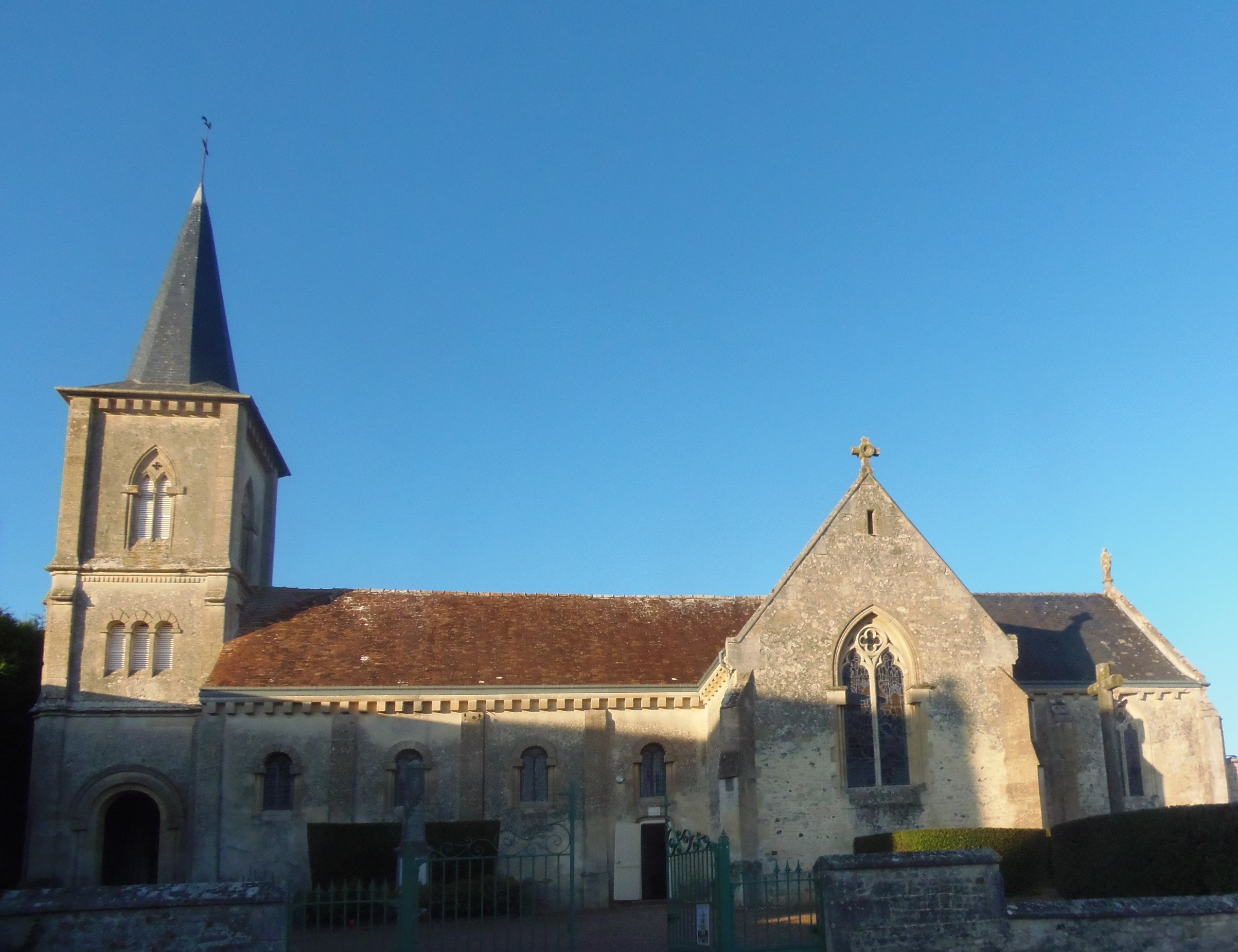
Montgaroult church

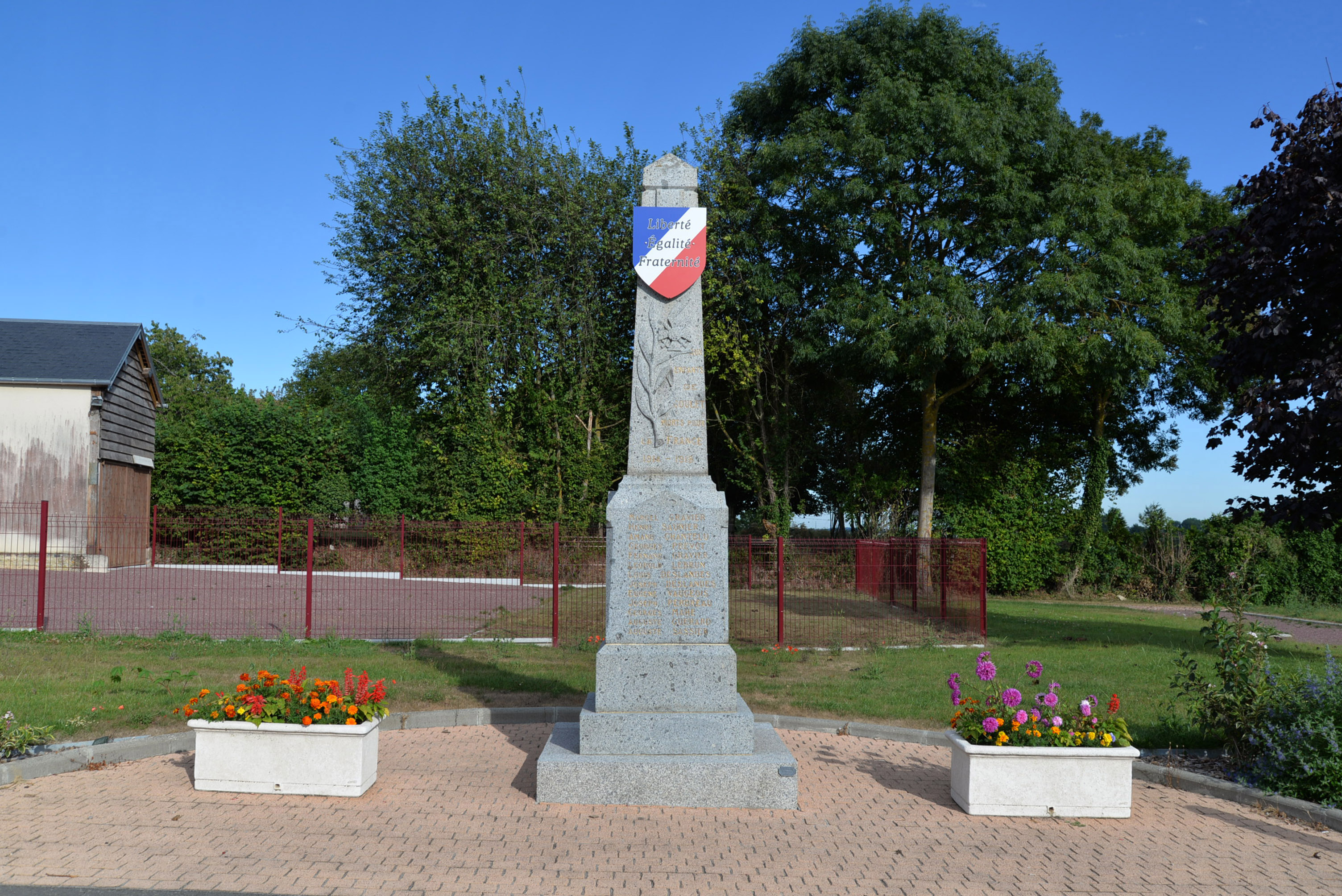
War Memorial in Goulet

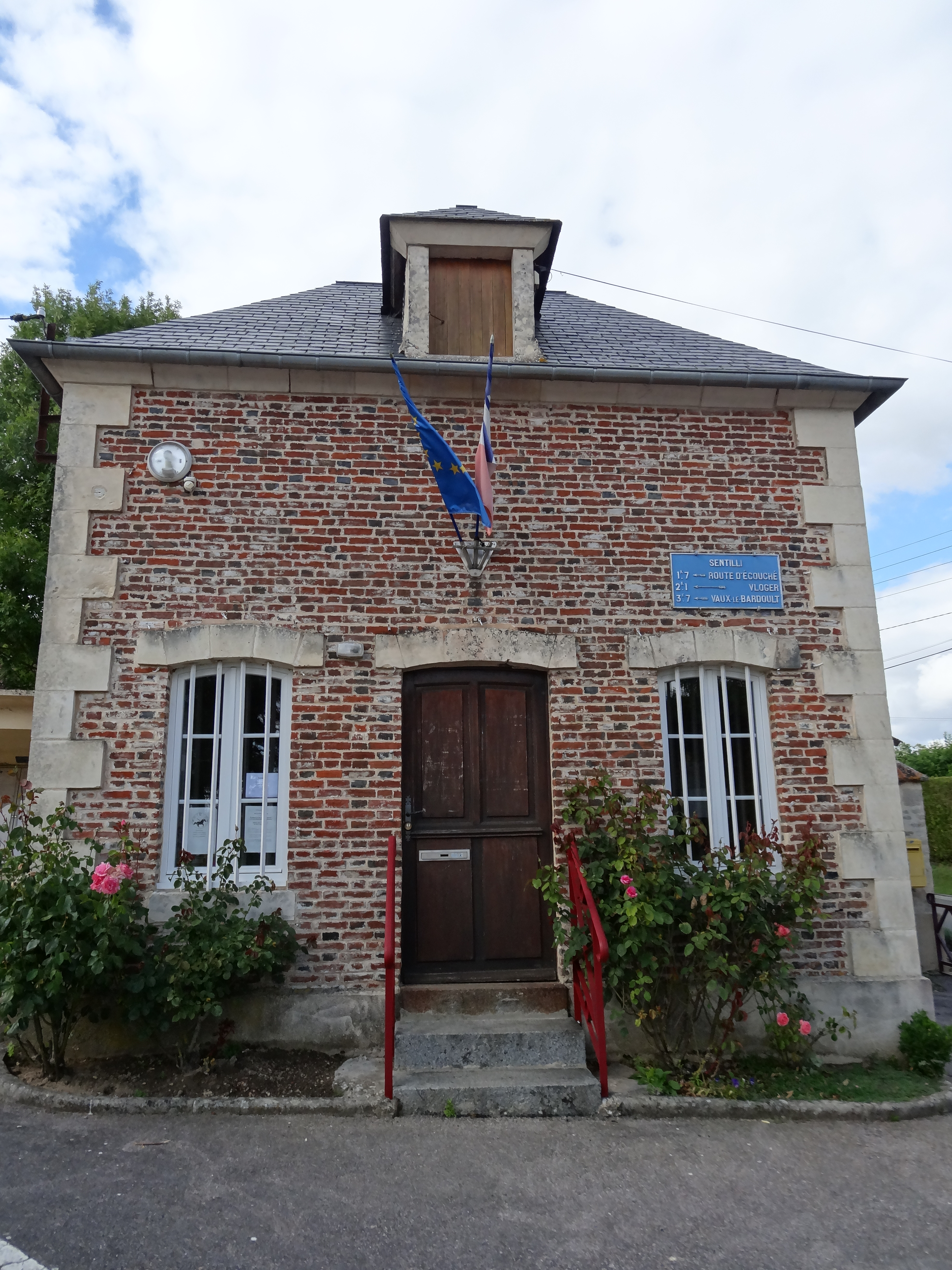
Sentilly Mayors office

== See also ==
- Communes of the Orne department
