= Laura de Jonge =

Canadian film director

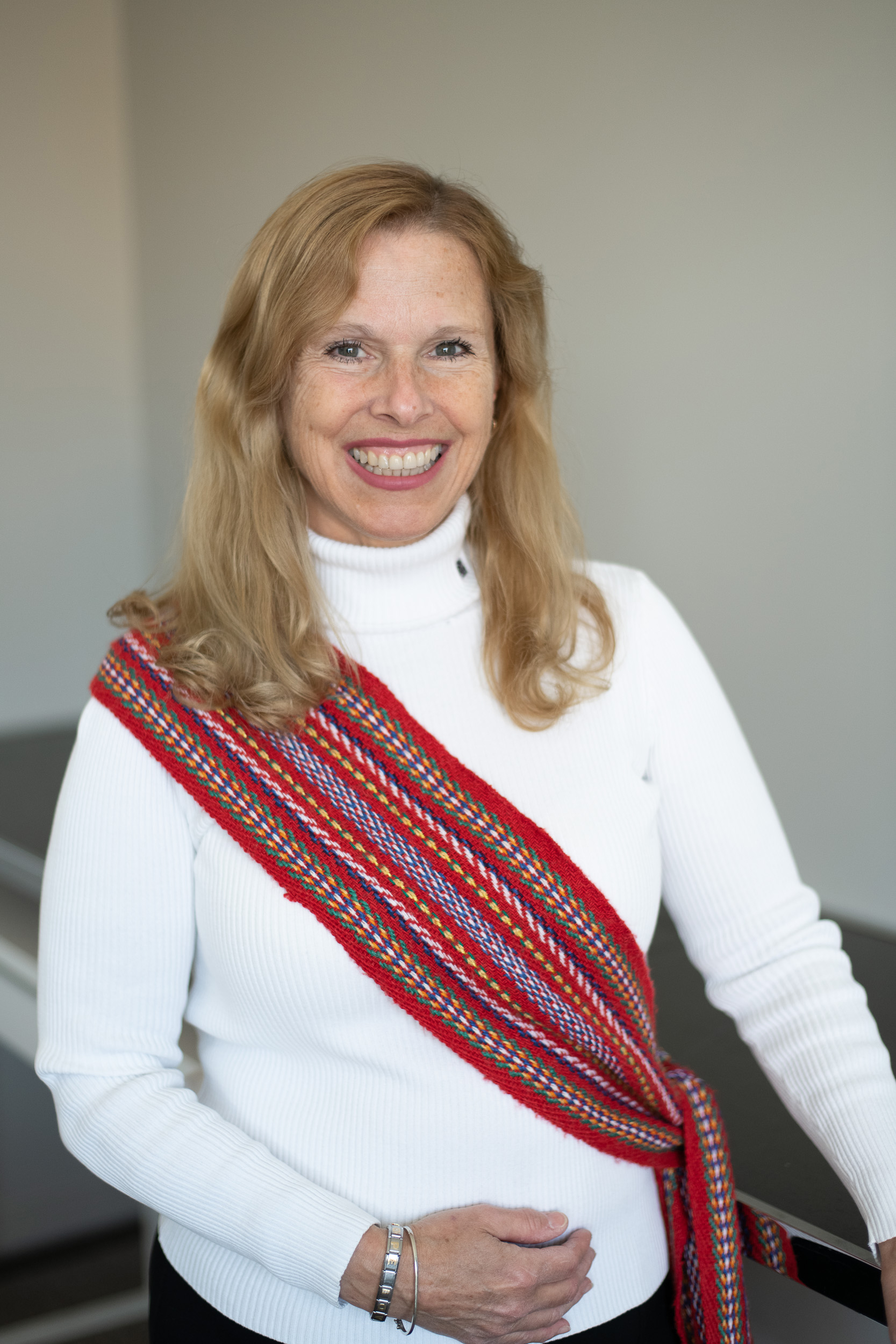
Dr Lolly de Jonge in Metis sash

Laura Anne "Lolly" de Jonge (née Goulet; born September 2, 1960) is a Métis family advocate, corporate social responsibility practitioner, filmmaker and magazine founder from Canada.

== Early life ==
Laura is a 13th-generation descendant of Louis Hébert and Marie Rollet, Canada’s first permanent colonial settlers. Her father, George R. D. Goulet, is Métis, and has written many books on the subject with his wife and fellow author, Terry Goulet.

De Jonge earned a Masters in Environment and Management from Royal Roads University where she received the Chancellor's Award for highest academic performance in her program and the Founders Award for the graduating learner in each program who exemplifies the qualities of leadership, sustainability and personal development. With her husband Mike de Jonge she established an academic bursary at Royal Roads. Laura earned a Ph.D. in Human and Organizational Development from Fielding Graduate University.

Laura is a graduate of Red Deer College, the University of Calgary, and has a certificate in Corporate Social Responsibility at the University of Toronto.

== Career ==
De Jonge worked with Nexen, Inc. for over a decade. During her time as Director, Global Business Practices, she served on the Advisory Committee of the Corporate Ethics Management Council for the Conference Board of Canada in addition to serving as Vice-Chair of the Social Responsibility Working Group of the International Petroleum Industry Environmental Conservation Association (a participant of the Business Action for Energy). This included chairing the human rights task force. She sat on the boards of Canadian Business for Social Responsibility and the Calgary Society of Independent Filmmakers where she also served as President.

In 2004 Laura produced and directed the film What Goes Around Comes Around which was recognized by the Crystal Vision Awards in 2005.

Laura is an advocate who supports natural pregnancy, childbirth and parenting. She played an active role in achieving recognition of midwifery as a profession in Alberta in 1992. Laura was recognized in the Alberta legislature when public funding of midwifery services was announced in 2008. She donated to establish the Sandra Botting Bursary at Mount Royal University for students in the Bachelor of Midwifery degree program. In 2014 the CBC reported she was the primary author of a report published by the Maternity Care Consumers of Alberta Network that highlighted a shortage of health care practitioners throughout rural Alberta.

Her work as a corporate social responsibility practitioner was profiled in Deb Abbey’s bestselling book, Global Profit and Global Justice, Using Your Money to Change the World.

In May 2010 Laura facilitated a presentation on the diversity of the Canadian Landscape for the Alberta Women's Science Network Operation Minerva Project - Aboriginal Girls Program for students from the Calgary Board of Education, the Catholic School System and the Siksika First Nation community.

De Jonge is the founder of Birthing Magazine, published by Birth Unlimited.

In 2015, Laura was a producer for the television series Transformation to Parenthood, a six episode documentary series about becoming a parent.

== See also ==
- Notable Aboriginal people of Canada
