= Guillet =

Guillet is a surname. Notable people with the surname include:

- Adolphe Guillet dit Tourangeau (1831–1894), Quebec notary and politician
- Amedeo Guillet (1909–2010), Italian Army officer
- Jean-Jacques Guillet (born 1946), French politician
- Léon Guillet (1873–1946), French metallurgist
- Louis Guillet (1788–1868), Quebec notary and politician
- George Guillet (1840–1926), Canadian politician
- Pernette Du Guillet (c.1520–1545), French poet
- Valère Guillet (1796–1881), Quebec notary and politician

== See also ==
- Gullett
