= Montgaroult =

- Part of Monts-sur-Orne
- Location of Montgaroult
- Location within France Location within Normandy
- Coordinates: 48°44′58″N 0°07′49″W
- Country: France
- Region: Normandy
- Department: Orne
- Arrondissement: Argentan
- Canton: Magny-le-Désert
- Commune: Monts-sur-Orne
- Area^{1}: 13.87 km^{2} (5.36 sq mi)
- Elevation: 200 m (660 ft)
- Highest elevation: 252 m (827 ft)
- Lowest elevation: 144 m (472 ft)
- Population (2022): 373
  - Density: 26.9/km^{2} (69.7/sq mi)
- Time zone: UTC+01:00 (CET)
  - Summer (DST): UTC+02:00 (CEST)
- Postal code: 61150
- ^{1} French Land Register data, which excludes lakes, ponds, glaciers > 1 km^{2} (0.386 sq mi or 247 acres) and river estuaries.

Montgaroult (French pronunciation: [mɔ̃ɡaʁu]) is a former commune in the Orne department in north-western France. On 1 January 2018, it was merged into the new commune of Monts-sur-Orne.

== See also ==
- Communes of the Orne department
