= Flying Officer Chronograph =

The Flying Officer chronograph wristwatch (1939–present), designed and manufactured in La Chaux-de-Fonds, Switzerland by Gallet & Co., was commissioned by Senator Harry S. Truman from Missouri in 1939 for pilots and navigators of the United States Army Air Forces.

Originally known as the "Flight Officer", a rank in the early Army Air Forces, the watch's unique rotating 12-hour bezel and 23 cities printed on the periphery of the dial (face) made it possible to calculate changes in the time as a pilot flew across lines of longitude.

The Gallet Flying Officer Chronograph holds distinctions as the world's first time zone calculating wristwatch. It is also the second wrist-worn chronograph, preceded only by Gallet's Clamshell, to have a water-resistant case. The Flying Officer was initially available only to flight officers and pilots of the allied forces during World War II. After the war, Gallet began to sell the Flying Officer commercially, and it remained as a popular watch for military, commercial, and civilian aviators.

Truman himself wore a Gallet Flying Officer during his terms as 33rd president of the United States (1945–1953), now housed in the collection of the Harry S. Truman Presidential Library and Museum. This historic watch was also featured in "Time in Office", an exhibit held at the National Watch and Clock Museum that showcased the actual timepieces used by past American presidents dating back to George Washington.

Gallet made a specific "Red Tail" edition of their Flying Officer Chronograph during World War II. The "Red Tail" was a special edition made only available to the soldiers known today as the Tuskegee Airmen. The colors on the dial were red, silver, and black to match the colors of the planes they flew in World War II. To date only one is known to be in existence.

In 2010, the Gallet Company produced 5 small series of its aviator’s wristwatch as a special benefit for the National Watch and Clock Museum in Columbia, Pennsylvania. Powered by Gallet's new in-house manufactured “MultiChron” movement, this series included 250 each in stainless steel, 250 in 18k yellow gold, 250 in 18k white gold, 250 in 18k red gold, and 50 in platinum. According to Walter Hediger, the company's CEO, the watches were offered at a fraction of the normal selling price as a way to quickly assist the Museum achieve its yearly funding goals. A highly complicated, certified chronometer grade mechanical timepiece, The "Museum Edition" Flight Officer was equipped with 51 jewels, automatic self-winding, adjustable world time zone calculator, silicon (Silicium) escapement, dual mainsprings for increased accuracy and extended power reserve, and 12-hour double-chronograph functions for timing two aeronautical events simultaneously.

== Gallet Flying Officer Gallery ==
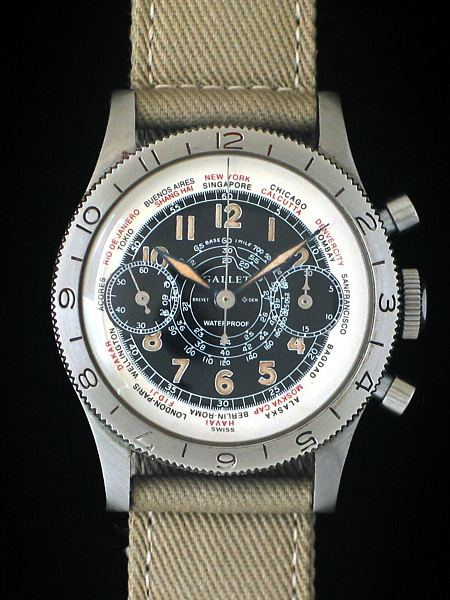
Flight Officer Chronograph (1939) - Commissioned by Harry S Trumans's senatorial staff for issue to pilots and flight officers of the US Army Air Forces during World War II

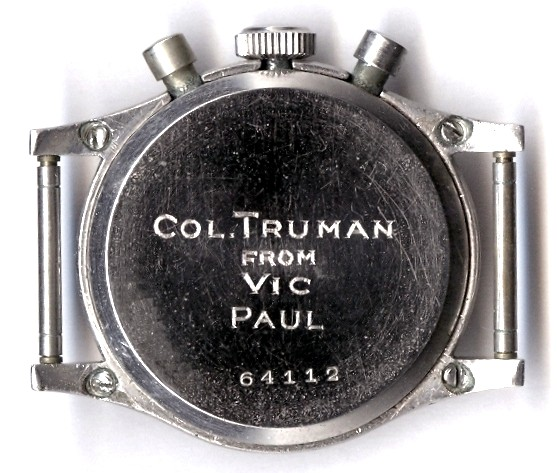
Reverse view of President Truman's Flight Officer Chronograph showing the 4 compression screws of the early water resistant case (circa 1939)

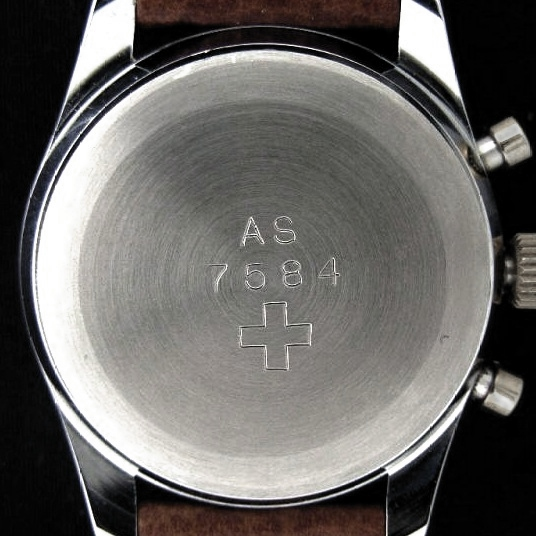
Flying Officer Chronograph (1970) - Reverse view of the Swiss Air Force version

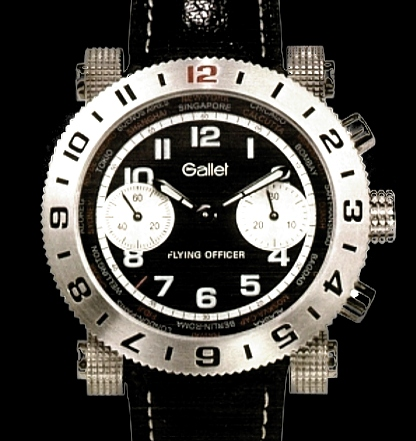
Flying Officer Chronograph (2005) - limited-edition version in hard titanium with Gallet-manufactured 24-jewel MultiChron automatic calibre.

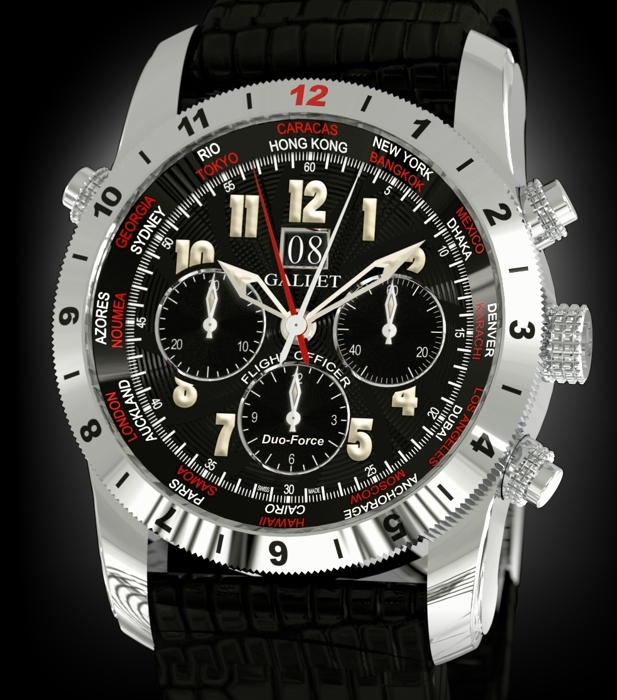
Museum Edition Flight Officer (2010) - automatic split rattrapante chronograph, dual mainsprings, Silicium escape wheel, chronometer, 51 jewels
