= Robert L. Goulet =

American sports agent

Robert Lowry Goulet is a marketing sports agent who managed the career of two-time U.S. Open champion Ernie Els, and was responsible for handling Els’ day-to-day business affairs on behalf of Legends Inc. of South Africa. During this time, Goulet managed Els in the United States as he won the 1997 U.S. Open at the Congressional Country Club.

Goulet previously represented the marketing affairs for top professional golfers, including Phil Mickelson, David Toms, Larry Mize, Corey Pavin, Bob Tway, Rocco Mediate and Larry Nelson during his tenure as the Director of Marketing for Cornerstone Sports Inc. from 1990 to 1995. Gould has been the agent for LPGA Tour golfer Kris Tschetter since 1992.

Goulet is also credited as co-creator of VH1’s successful Fairway to Heaven Invitational charity golf event, starting in 1994. Rock stars and celebrities, including Bill Murray, Glenn Frey, Hootie and the Blowfish, Sheryl Crow, Alice Cooper, Bill Berry, Mike Mills, Tico Torres and David Bryan, get together to swing golf clubs at this cable TV-sponsored event that usually tags onto the Las Vegas Invitational in October.
