= Paul Goulet =

Paul Marc Goulet
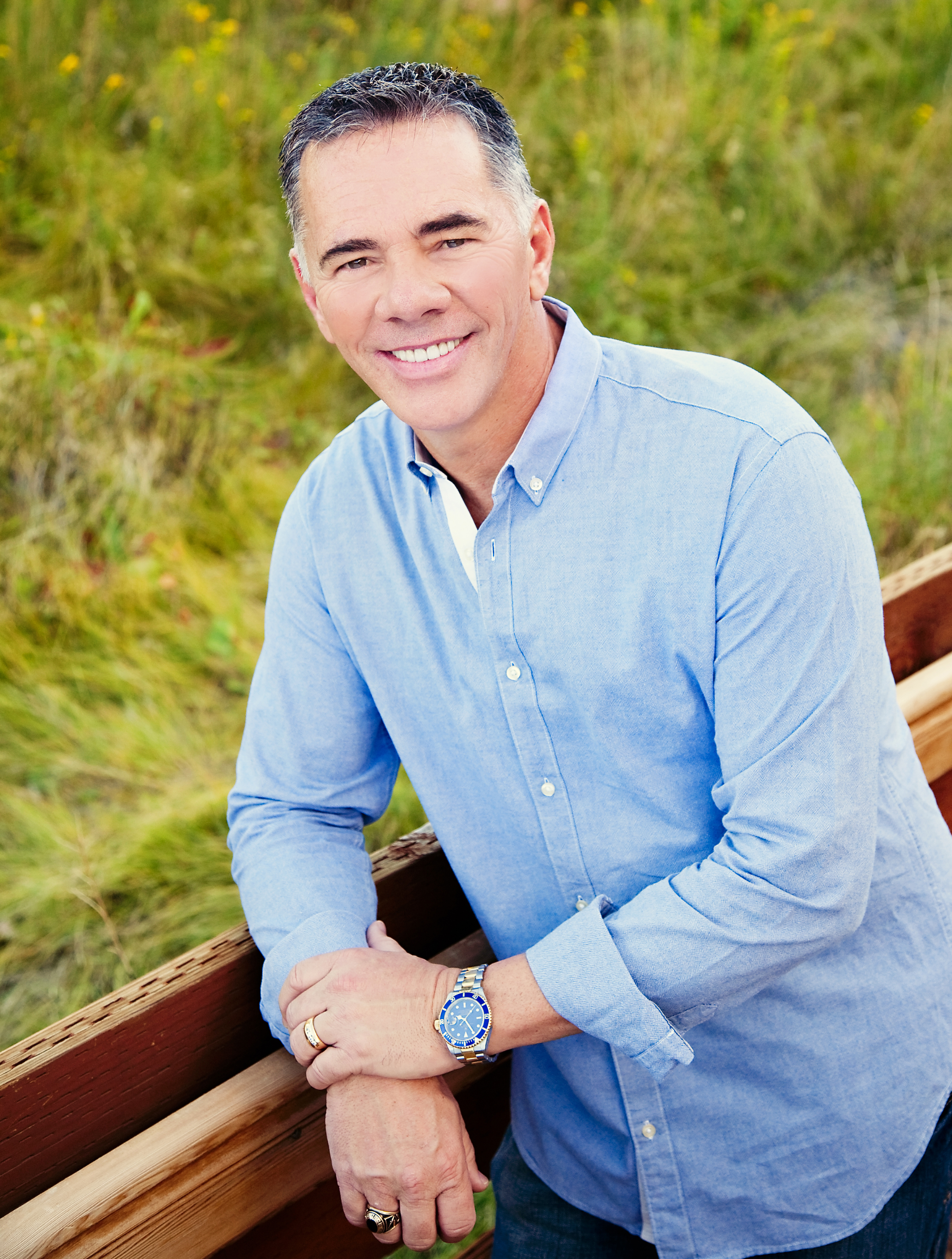

Personal life
- Born: February 25, 1958 (age 68)
- Education: Ashland University University of Ottawa

Religious life
- Religion: Christian
- Denomination: Nondenominational

Paul Goulet (born February 25, 1958) is a speaker, author, writer and consultant from Nevada. In 2013, Goulet was recognized as a Distinguished Nevadan by the Nevada System of Higher Education. June 22nd 2022 was named the Rev. Paul Marc Goulet Day by action of the city council of Las Vegas Nevada.

== Biography ==
=== Formal Education ===
Paul Goulet has earned a bachelor's degree from University of Ottawa. He has also received a master's degree from Ashland University.

=== Career ===
Paul Marc Goulet served as the founder of Capital counseling services in Sacramento California from 1988 to 1992. He served as the Senior Leader of the International Church of Las Vegas, a multi-site congregation in Las Vegas, Nevada. He retired from this church in March 2022.

The church's three local campuses welcomed thousands of worshipers from the Las Vegas metropolitan area on a weekly basis. The church's online extension, iChurch, broadcasts many church services live. Paul Marc is also credited with pioneering the International Christian Academy, the international sports academy and Dad inc. (a federally sponsored program designed to help fathers reconnect with their children).

Goulet's international work touched over thirty-one countries. Under his leadership and sponsorship slum schools, orphanages, businesses and churches were started around the world. He also partnered with John C. Maxwell's EQUIP organization to bring leadership training to Las Vegas, France and other locations.

Paul Marc Goulet has thrown himself into philanthropic endeavors since his retirement from ICLV. He has written values curriculum for the nation of Madagascar and has been traveling there since 2017. He works through his non profit (The Las Vegas Resource center) to meet the needs of this impoverished country. He recently purchased rugby cleats for the women's team who were trying to qualify for the World Cup. 

Paul Marc and his team of volunteers recently helped train thousands of people in developing leadership skills. His partnership with the agricultural initiative called PPC hopes to help the farming community reach higher levels of production. His friendship with the president and his family has opened up many doors of influence in government, education and business. His yearly goal is to train 100,000 leaders a year in Madagascar.

He has recently started to train business leaders in the U.S. through a series of seminars called "The Growth Journey". He believes that everything rises and falls with leadership.

He has also authored several books and previously hosted and produced the local television program 2020 Vision.

== Bibliography ==
- Crossing Your Next Threshold (2006)
- The Five Powers of God (2007, Thomas Nelson)
- The Transformed Family (2008)
- The Keys of The Kingdom (2014)
- ‘’The Vision Bible’’(2018)
- ‘’Game changers’’ (2022)
- ‘’ Cross your next threshold’’ (2023)
- ‘’Crack the code’’ (2025)
