= Tag Goulet =

Canadian author and entrepreneur

Tag Goulet, also known as Theresa Goulet or Therese Goulet, is an author, publishing entrepreneur, and film producer from Calgary, Alberta, Canada. Alongside her sister Catherine, she is co-founder of FabJob, a company that publishes career books from their offices in Calgary and Seattle.

== Career ==
Goulet has worked as communications director for the Law Society of Alberta, as a consultant in the publishing industry and in the technology sector during the dot-com boom. She has also worked with the American Management Association International and the Calgary Aboriginal Urban Affairs Committee.

As a writer, Goulet's work has been published by AOL, CNN, MSN, Sun Media and Metro News amongst other titles. She has also contributed essays to the official handbook of the Canadian Authors Association.

Alongside her sister Catherine, Goulet co-authored a book called Dream Careers which reached number #1 on Amazon's career and business list, and attracted the attention of ABC, Oprah Winfrey, Woman's Day and The Wall Street Journal. Goulet has authored more than eight books focused on breaking into different careers.

Goulet is the Director of "International Association of Professions (IAP) Career College". The college offers scholarships to Aboriginal, Native, and Indigenous people.

== Personal life ==
Goulet is Canadian Metis. She studied at the University of Calgary, where she received her BA in 1981 and her MA in 1986. She is the daughter of Terry Goulet and George R. D. Goulet, notable historians and authors, and the sister of Catherine Goulet, her business partner at FabJob.
