= Goulet River =

Goulet River may refer to:

- Goulet River (Bécancour River tributary), Arthabaska Regional County Municipality, Centre-du-Québec, Quebec, Canada
- Goulet River (Vermillon River tributary), Mauricie, Quebec, Canada
