= Goulet, Orne =

Goulet
- Part of Monts-sur-Orne
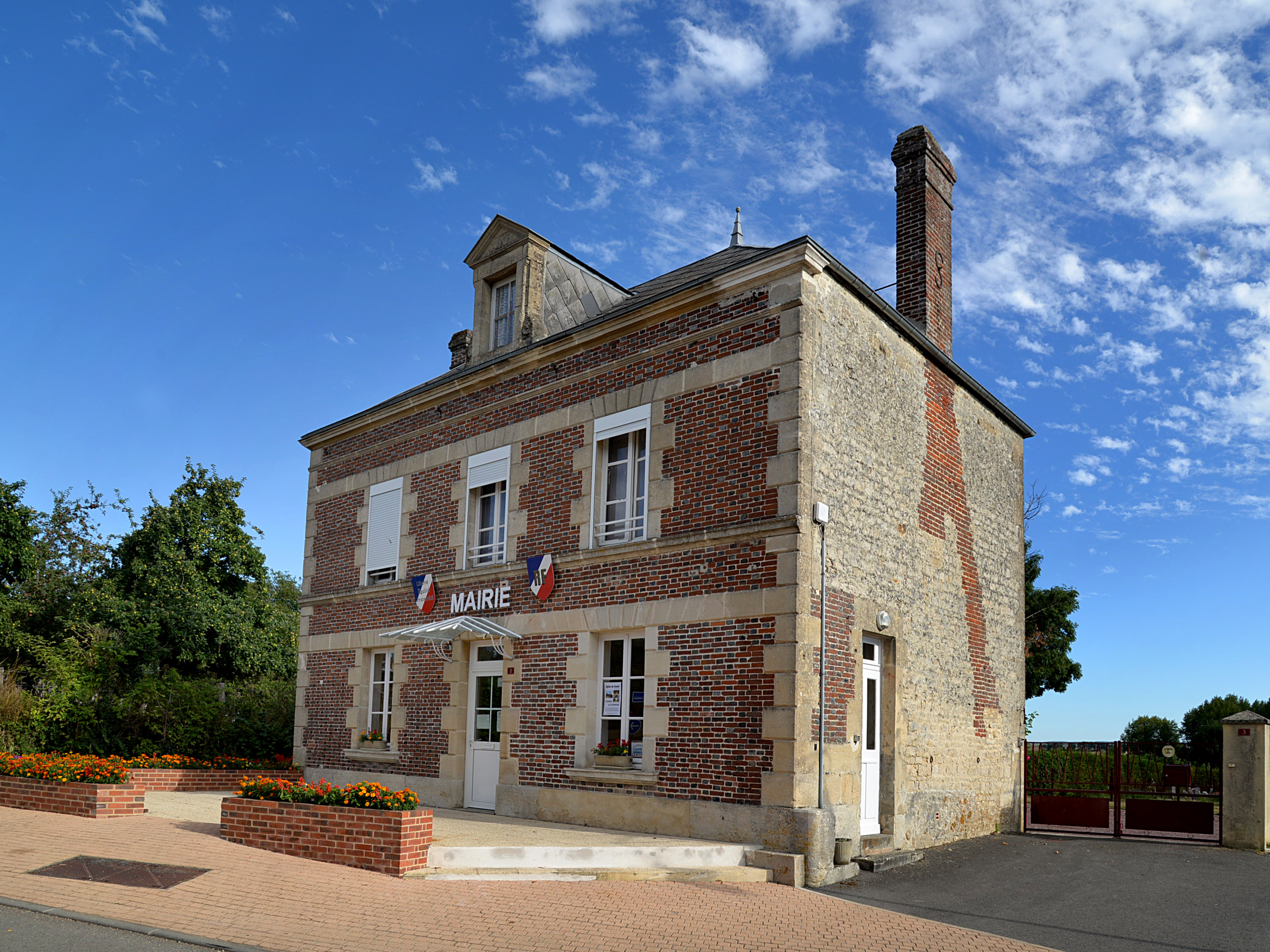
- The town hall of Goulet
- Location of Goulet
- Location within France Location within Normandy
- Coordinates: 48°44′01″N 0°05′30″W
- Country: France
- Region: Normandy
- Department: Orne
- Arrondissement: Argentan
- Canton: Magny-le-Désert
- Commune: Monts-sur-Orne
- Area^{1}: 9.3 km^{2} (3.6 sq mi)
- Elevation: 158 m (518 ft)
- Highest elevation: 194 m (636 ft)
- Lowest elevation: 147 m (482 ft)
- Population (2023): 387
  - Density: 42/km^{2} (110/sq mi)
- Time zone: UTC+01:00 (CET)
  - Summer (DST): UTC+02:00 (CEST)
- Postal code: 61150
- ^{1} French Land Register data, which excludes lakes, ponds, glaciers > 1 km^{2} (0.386 sq mi or 247 acres) and river estuaries.

Goulet (French pronunciation: [gulɛ]) is a former commune in the Orne department in north-western of France. On 1 January 2018, it was merged into the new commune of Monts-sur-Orne.

== See also ==
- Communes of the Orne department
