= Gullit =

Gullit may refer to:

- Alex Tamba Brima, also known as Gullit, (born 1971), a military commander of the Sierra Leone Civil War who was convicted of crimes against humanity and war crimes
- Asante Gullit Okyere (born 1988), Italian footballer
- Ruud Gullit (born 1962), Dutch football player and coach
- Maxim Gullit (born 2001), Dutch football player
- Gullit Zolameso (born 1995), Finnish-Angolan footballer
