= Gallet Clamshell =

1939 advertisement from Jewelers' Circular Keystone magazine of the Gallet MultiChron 30 "Clamshell", the world's first water resistant chronograph wristwatch

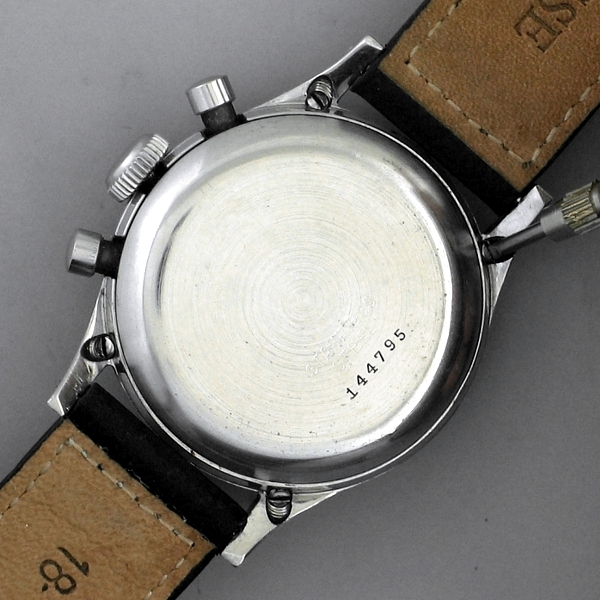
Reverse view of the Gallet Clamshell showing the 4 screws that compress the 2 part case around the flared acrylic crystal

1939 Esquire Magazine print advertisement of the Gallet Clamshell

The Clamshell, manufactured between 1936 and 1951 by the Gallet Watch Company of Switzerland, is the world's first water resistant wrist chronograph.

== History ==
Introduced before World War II as part of Gallet's MultiChron line of military and professional timepieces, Clamshell watches are distinguished by four screws on the back of the case, positioned at the base of the lugs where the band or bracelet attaches. Most Gallet Clamshell chronographs have a case diameter of 34.2 millimeters (excluding the winding crown) and an overall length of approximately 42 millimeters, although some smaller and larger models were released during the 1940s.

The Clamshell's 15-year history began in 1936 when Gallet purchased the rights to a patent for the "waterproof" watch case design (Brevet N° 189190), invented by the Swiss firm of Schmitz Frères & Cie in the neighboring city of Grenchen. By inserting gasket sealed pushbuttons into the side of this unique watch case design, Gallet was able to expand the water resistant characteristics of the Schmitz Frères concept to the more complex wrist-worn chronograph. Originally engineered by Gallet for the adverse conditions of the battlefield, the Clamshell chronograph derived its nickname from the way that the upper and lower sections of the watch case compressed together over a specially flared crystal, protecting the delicate inner mechanisms from the intrusion of water, dirt, dust, and caustic chemicals.

The "waterproof" Clamshell filled such a critical void in the area of military, industrial, and sports related timekeeping that its popularity helped Gallet's overall sales of wrist-worn watches and hand-held timers exceed 100,000 units per year for over 15 years. Gallet also supplied privately labeled versions of its Clamshell chronograph to other watch companies, as well as retailers that included C. Bucherer of Lucerne, Türler in Zurich, Tiffany & Co. of New York, and T. Eaton of Canada. In spite of the Clamshell's effectiveness at preventing water intrusion to a submerged depth of over 100 meters, it was eventually replaced by more easily serviceable versions with full screw-on case backs and readily available generic crystals.

== Clamshell Dials ==
During the 15 years of the Clamshell's production, numerous dial or face variations were released. Styles ranged from basic military specification black to more exotic two-toned and multicolored versions with tachymeter, telemeter chronograph, and heart rate indications. A relatively small number were released with luminous numbers, accompanied by radium-filled minute, hour, and sweep second hands for low-light conditions.

The Gallet Clamshell is a popular item for collectors of vintage timepieces with examples trading from $1000 to over $10,000. Current market values for classic Clamshells are based on a number of factors, the most important being the style and condition of the dial (face). An example with a non-original restored or refinished dial can lose between 25 and 40% of its value, while a Clamshell with an exotic original dial will command a premium. Original dials alone often trade in the hundreds with a few unusual styles selling for over $1000.

Due to the effectiveness of the Clamshell's water resistant case at protecting the watch's inner mechanism against the elements, vintage examples occasionally appear on the market and at auction in fully functional condition, often with non-degraded original dials.

Two early Gallet Clamshells are on permanent display at the National Watch and Clock Museum in Columbia, Pennsylvania.

== Related Watches ==
A particularly desirable "Clamshell" style wrist watch with collectors is Gallet's very first series of Flight Officer Chronographs with rotating bezel for multiple time zone calculation. Built around the waterproof design of the MultiChron 30 Clamshell, the Flight Officer's two-tone dial, printed with the world's major cities and inner telemetry scale, is rumored to have been designed in part by 33rd US president Harry S Truman while still a senator. The Flight Officer chronograph worn by Truman is now housed within the collection of the Harry S. Truman Presidential Library and Museum.

Whether or not the Truman Flight Officer should be designated as a Clamshell has been a long-standing argument among collectors. While most timekeeping historians and purist collectors feel that only the waterproof version of the early MultiChron model 30 should have this designation, a few site the shared compression case design of the two watches as possible justification for the early Flight Officer's inclusion into the Clamshell category. The fact that the Flight Officer only utilized the Clamshell style water protection system for the first decade of the watch's seven decades of production appears to support the former argument. This is further reinforced by the Gallet Company's distinctly separate nomenclature for these two different watch models.

This argument also arises in regards to the MultiChron Pilot Petite as well as Gallet's early time-only waterproof watches, since these two additional model groups also utilized the 4 screw Clamshell compression system for a brief period during the early 1940s.

== Vintage Clamshell Gallery ==
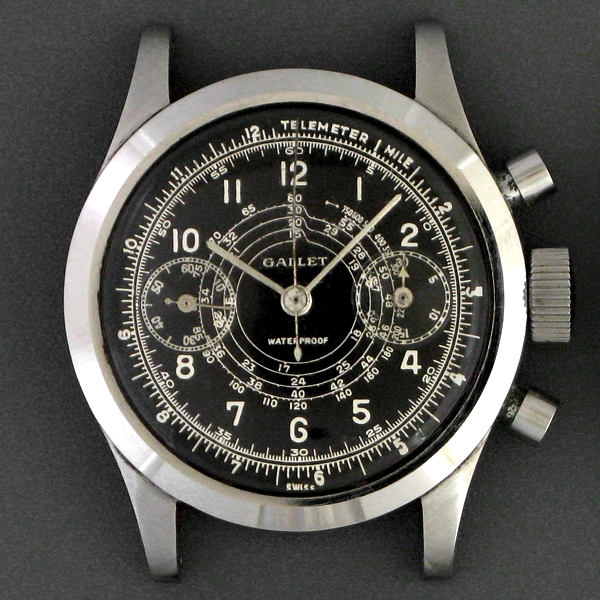
Gallet Clamshell (1943) with military style black dial and telemeter indications for artillery timing

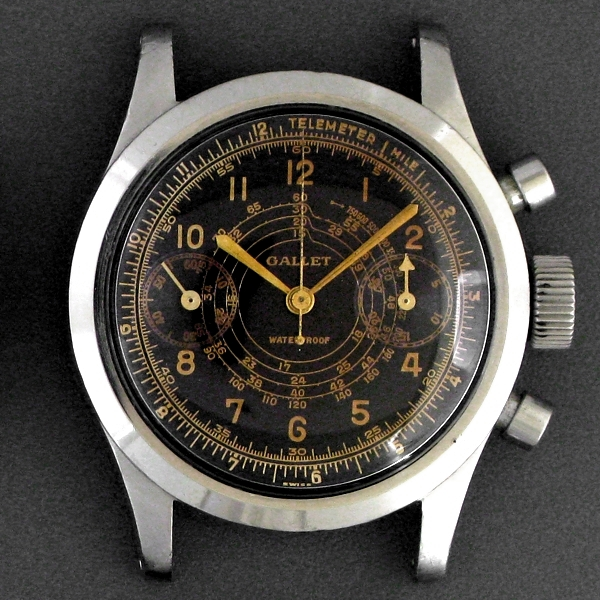
Gallet Clamshell (1943) with military style black dial, hands and dial indications in gold

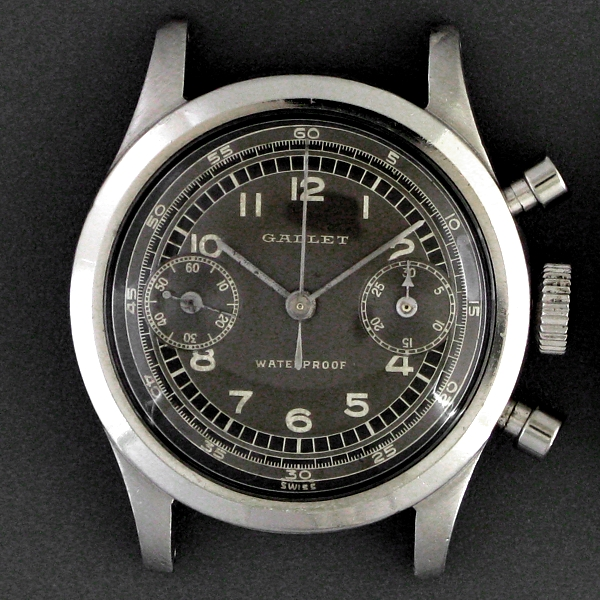
Gallet Clamshell (1942) with two-tone dial in black and dark grey

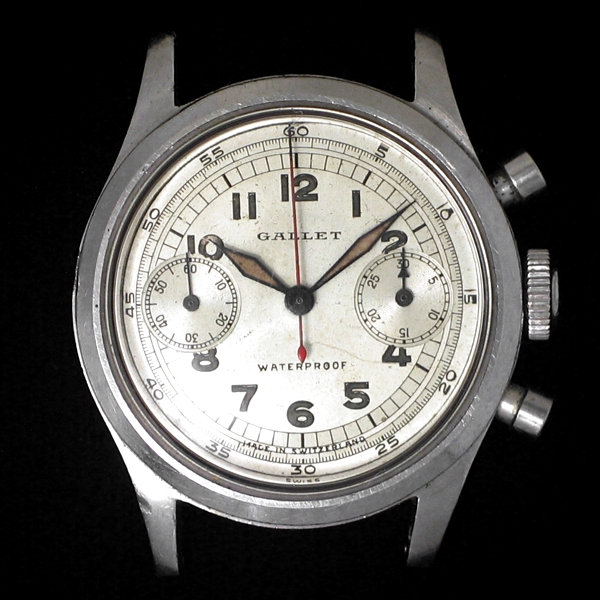
Gallet Clamshell (1938) with white dial, luminous hands and numbers

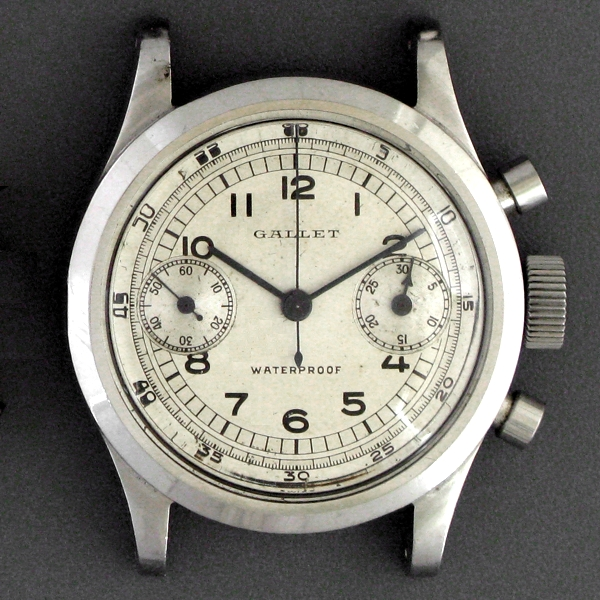
Gallet Clamshell (1942) with white dial, black indications and blued steel hands

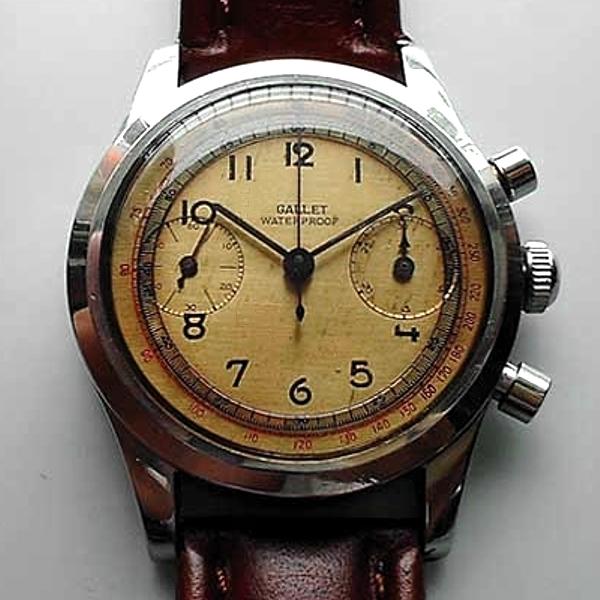
Gallet Clamshell (1939) with two-tone champagne and grey dial, mile-per-hour dial for auto racing

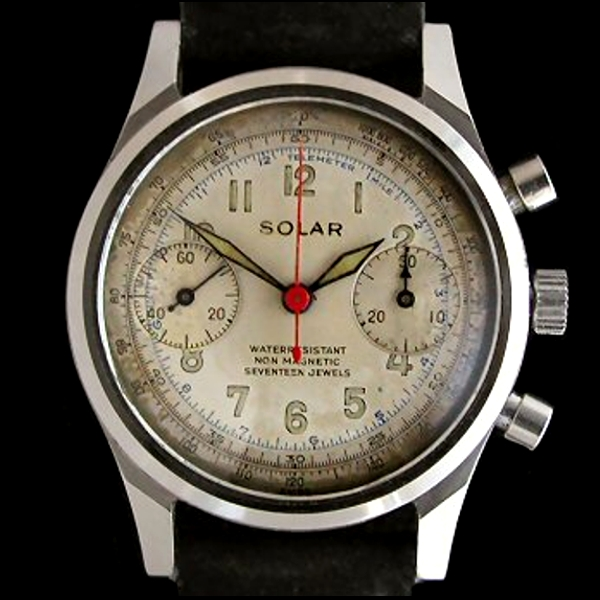
Gallet Clamshell (1940), signed SOLAR for Eaton's Department store in Canada

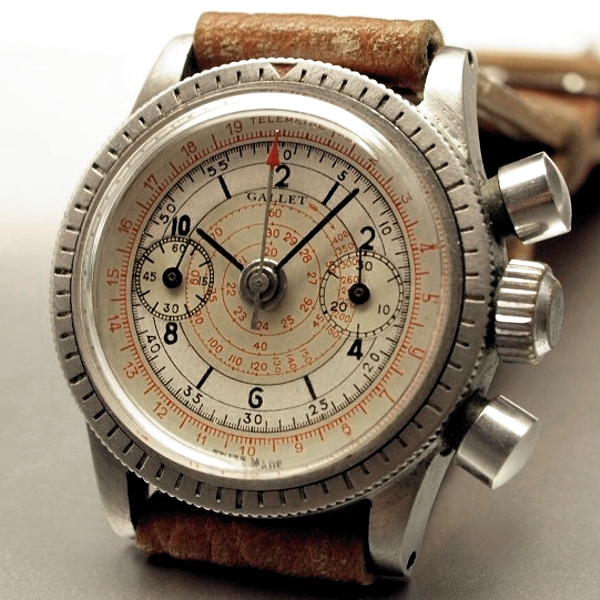
MultiChron Pilot Petit (1943), Miniature Valjoux 69 powered pilot's chronograph with rotating time zone bezel
