= Catherine Goulet =

Catherine Goulet is an author, publishing entrepreneur, and careers expert from Vancouver, British Columbia, Canada. She is co-founder of the Next Generation Indie Book Awards, a literary awards program for independently-published books, co-founder of career guides publisher FabJob alongside her sister Tag and founder of zenGOT, a platform which connects customers and service providers.

== Career ==
Goulet is co-founder and chairperson of the Next Generation Indie Book Awards, a literary awards program for independently published books. She has said that one of her goals is to make the awards "the Sundance of indie books". Goulet herself is author of more than four books focused on breaking into different careers and she has written on work-related topics for international press titles including Metro News and CNN.

Alongside her sister Tag, Goulet co-authored a book called Dream Careers which reached number #1 on Amazon's career and business list, and attracted the attention of ABC, Oprah Winfrey, Woman's Day and The Wall Street Journal.

== Personal life ==
Goulet, who is Metis, is the daughter of best-selling author Terry Goulet and George R. D. Goulet, a notable historian and author, and the sister of Tag Goulet, her business partner at FabJob.
