= FabJob =

Book publisher based in Calgary, Canada and Seattle

- Website type: Private
- Headquarters: Calgary, {{{location_country}}}
- No. of locations: 2 (Calgary and Seattle)
- Founders: Tag Goulet and Catherine Goulet
- Industry: Publishing
- Website: fabjob.com
- Launched: 1999

FabJob is a book publisher based in Calgary, Canada, and Seattle, United States. It was founded in 1999 by sisters Tag and Catherine Goulet.

== History ==
The company's guide books initially began as electronic titles in e-Book and CD-ROM formats. Since then, a number of their titles have been published in print, though the majority of their books remain available as PDF e-Books. FabJob guides range from 240 to 360 pages of searchable information about how to get started in a specific dream career. Each guide includes information about how to do the job, how to get experience, how to get hired, how to start a business, how to set your fees or prices, and how to get clients or customers.

Each book contains advice and information from individuals in a particular field, such as athletes, actors, authors and business people.

== Books ==
FabJob has published more than 100 books on careers topics including the following titles:

- FabJob Guide to Become an Accessories Store Owner
- FabJob Guide to Become an Actor
- FabJob Guide to Become an Advertising Copywriter
- FabJob Guide to Become an Antiques Shop Owner
- FabJob Guide to Become an Archaeologist
- FabJob Guide to Become an Art Curator

== Accolades ==
FabJob has been named the number one place to get published online by Writer's Digest and has received an EPPIE Award for excellence in electronic publishing.

FabJob has received press coverage from Woman's Day Magazine and Entrepreneur.com amongst other titles, and the company has been profiled by CityTV in Toronto. Founders Tag Goulet and Catherine Goulet have also written for Metro News and The Calgary Sun about careers topics on behalf of the company.

The FabJob book Dream Careers by Tag and Catherine Goulet ranked #1 in career and business books on Amazon when it was released.

== In popular culture ==
FabJob was featured in the 2005 movie Bewitched starring Nicole Kidman and Will Ferrell. The set decorating coordinator for the movie contacted FabJob to provide some print books, including a fake one called "The FabJob Guide to Becoming a Witch or Warlock", and large cardboard book displays. These props were subsequently used in a scene where main character Samantha Stephens was looking for inspiration in a bookstore to guide her towards a new career.
