= British Association of Canadian Studies =

Learned society

British Association for Canadian Studies
- Abbreviation: BACS
- Formation: 1975
- Type: Academic Association, Charity
- Registration no.: 272144
- President: Tony McCulloch
- Affiliations: International Council for Canadian Studies
- Website: https://britishassociationforcanadianstudies.com/

The British Association for Canadian Studies (BACS) is a membership-based academic association that is also a registered UK charity. BACS was founded in 1975 in order to promote Canadian studies in the United Kingdom. Along with the establishment of the Academic Relations Unit at the Canada House, it significantly helped the growth of Canadian Studies in the UK in the 1970s. The organization has 400 members as of somewhere around 2016, and holds an annual conference attended by around 150 academics and postgraduate students each year. It also publishes a peer-reviewed journal called the British Journal of Canadian Studies. It contains seven specialist groups for academics, on aboriginal studies, economics, architecture, literature, law, and Quebec as well as a resources group. BACS is a member of the International Council for Canadian Studies (ICCS), of which it was a founding member in 1981.
