= CCH Canadian =

Canadian accounting company

Wolters Kluwer Canada
- Industry: Publishing and information services
- Headquarters: Toronto, Ontario, Canada
- Key people: Frans Klaassen, President; Nancy McKinstry, CEO
- Products: Content, software, services in the fields of tax, accounting, financial planning, auditing, law and human resources.
- Revenue: €4.6 billion (2020)
- Number of employees: 19,200 (2020)
- Website: www.wolterskluwer.ca

Wolters Kluwer Canada (previously known as CCH Canadian Limited) is one of the four operating units of Wolters Kluwer Tax & Accounting. Wolters Kluwer Canada is a provider in the area of tax, accounting, law, human resources and financial planning.

== History ==
Wolters Kluwer Canada can trace its origins back to 1931 when, as the Kingsland Company, it was responsible for numerous insurance and legal publications.

In 1939 the Kingsland Company became the exclusive distributor in Canada for Commerce Clearing House Inc.'s loose leaf publication Canadian Tax Reports in three volumes. In 1945 the Kingsland Company and CCH jointly formed CCH Canadian Limited. In 1950, Mr. Kingsland sold his interest in the company and CCH Canadian Limited became a wholly owned affiliate of Commerce Clearing House, Inc.

In 1979, CCH Canadian acquired Formules Municipales Ltée (FM), a Quebec-based company which had been supplying forms and stationery requirements of the municipalities and school boards of Quebec since 1886. "FM" was renamed Publications CCH Ltée in 1996 and was becoming one of the largest publishers of legislative information outside the Quebec government, producing French language products and reporting on Quebec provincial laws and regulations which are based on French Civil Law.

CCH Incorporated was purchased by Wolters Kluwer, the Dutch publishing company on November 27, 1995. Wolters Kluwer's core publishing markets include legal, tax and business, health, science, and education, in 26 countries, as well as North America. It has over 19,000 employees worldwide. On January 1, 1996, CCH Incorporated became a wholly owned subsidiary of Wolters Kluwer NV (Amsterdam).

In July, 1998 WK acquired SoftKey, a tax compliance software company. Now located in Sherbrooke, Quebec, the tax compliance products Cantax and TaxPrep (software for preparing tax returns) formed the backbone of CCH's Tax Compliance products. These software products simplify compliance for tax practitioners, preparing tax returns for all federal and provincial/territorial jurisdictions.

In September 2000, CCH acquired Portfolio Publishing financial planning software products.

== See also ==
- CCH Canadian Ltd. v. Law Society of Upper Canada
