= Gallet & Company =

Swiss timepiece manufacturer

Gallet
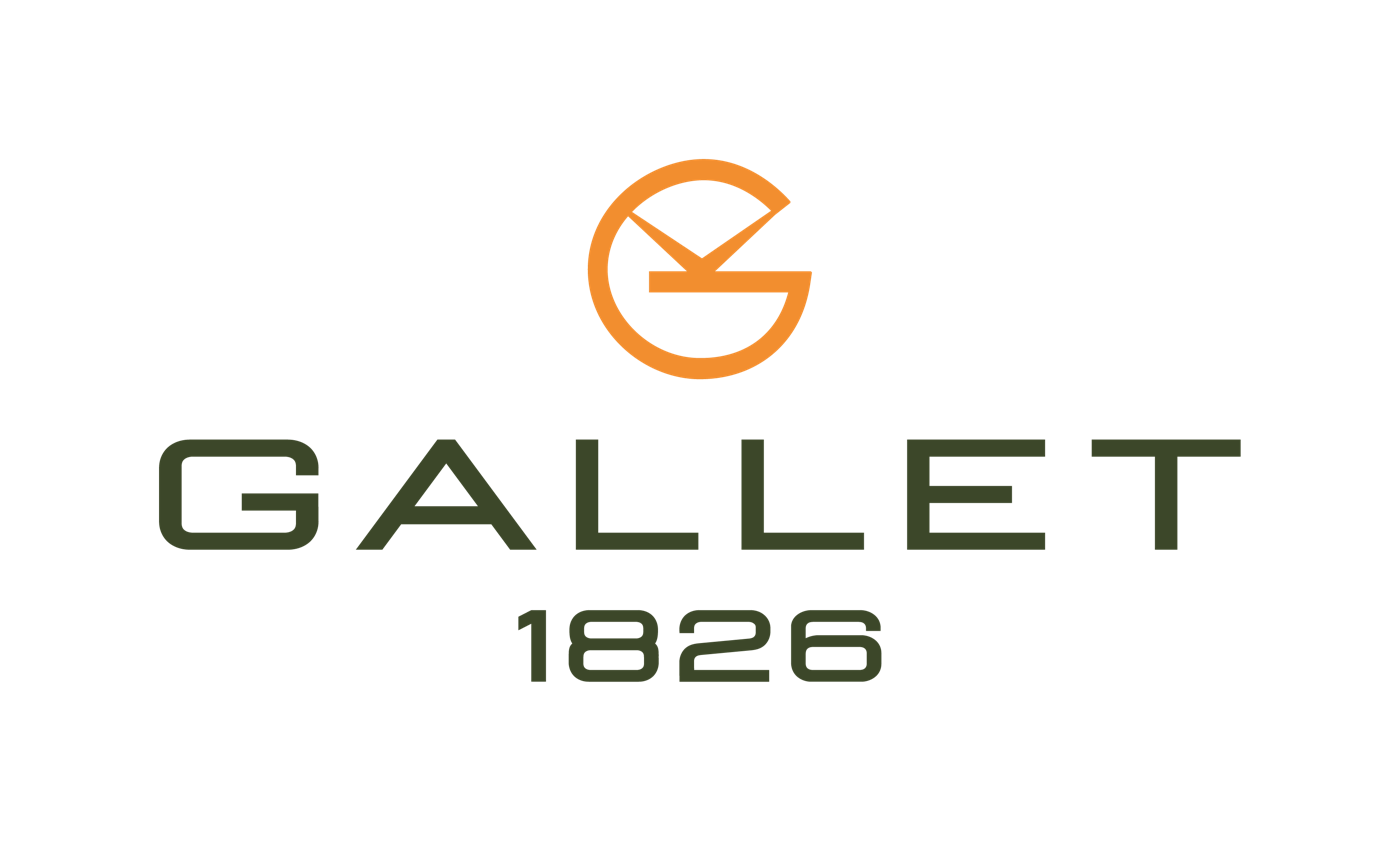
- Type: Corporation Breitling SA
- Industry: Watch manufacturing
- Founded: Historical company 1826 by Julien Gallet in La Chaux-de-Fonds
- Headquarters: Switzerland
- Products: Wristwatches
- Owner: Breitling SA
- Website: gallet.com

Gallet (/ˈɡæleɪ/; French: [galɛ]) is a Swiss watch brand that originated in 1826, when Julien Gallet founded Gallet & Co. in La Chaux-de-Fonds, Switzerland. Gallet, whose primary export market was the United States, is known for stopwatches and specialized chronograph watches designed for aviation, motor-sport, industry, long-distance travel and exploration.

== History ==
The Gallet family traces their roots back to 1466, when Humbertus Gallet became a citizen of Geneva. Oral family history claims that he was involved in clockmaking, as several later members of the Geneva-based Gallet family were part of the goldsmith's guild with similar oral family history documenting watchmaking activities during their work as goldsmiths. However, none of the clocks, timers or watches built by Gallet ancestors have survived, the continuous roots and origin begin with the establishment of the watch manufacturer Gallet & Co. by Julien Gallet in 1826 in La Chaux-de-Fonds.

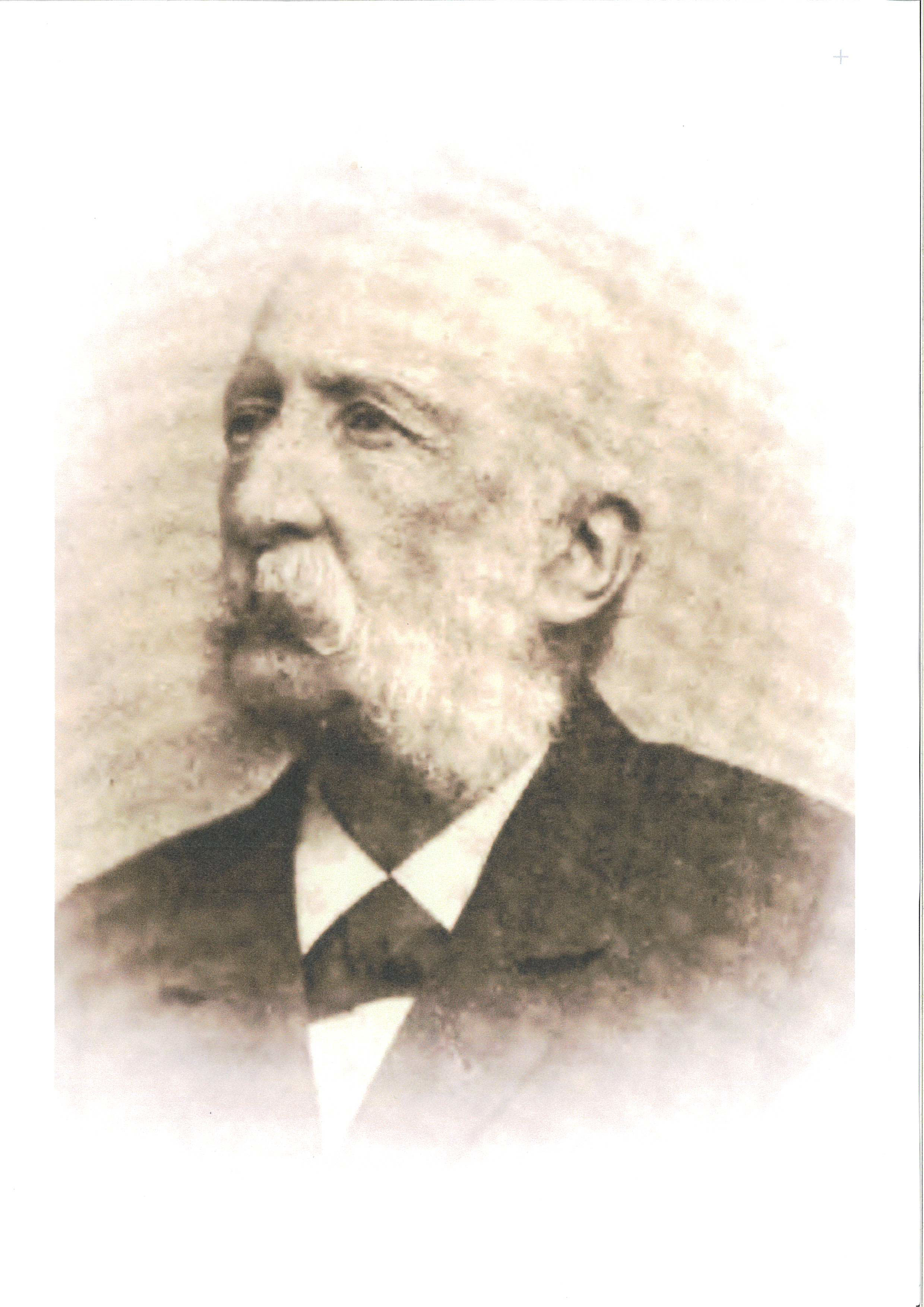
Portrait of Leon Gallet

U.S. records suggest that Gallet's representation in the United States began as early as 1856. One of the founder's sons, Leon Gallet, may have been the driving force behind this expansion. He "created a large clientele in the United States, where he often traveled." He eventually died during one of his journeys to the United States.

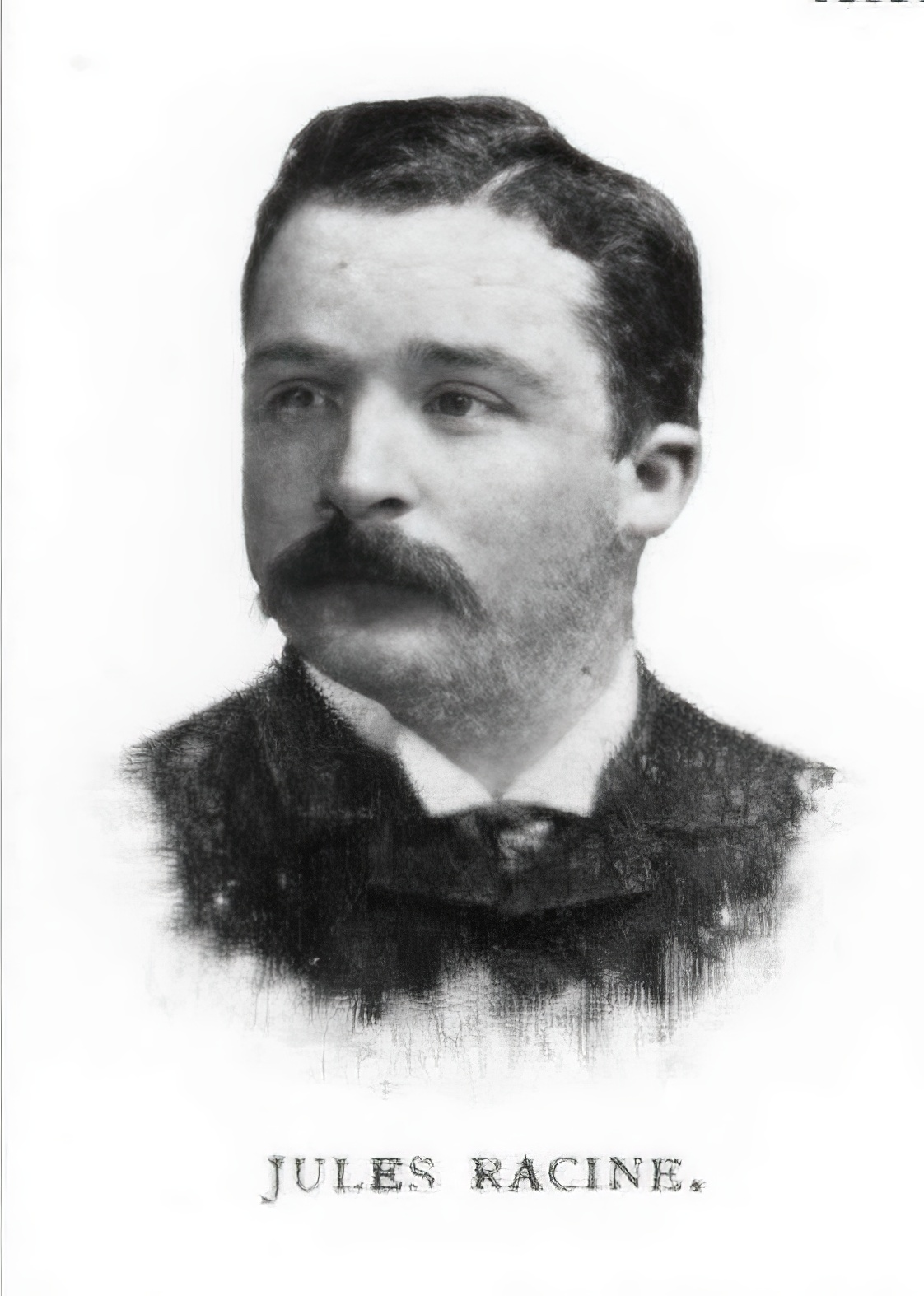
Jules Racine in 1893

Julien Gallet's grandson, Jules Racine, played the next role in Gallet's history. In 1890, Jules Racine, together with Charles Perret, established Jules Racine & Co in New York, which became the sole distributor and importer of Gallet watches in the United States. Jules Racine led the company for 45 years, during which he witnessed another important period in the brand's history. This period began in 1907 when Gallet acquired Société d'Horlogerie Electa. The following years were marked by technical innovation, new patents, and international recognition from exhibition prizes and success at chronometry competitions.

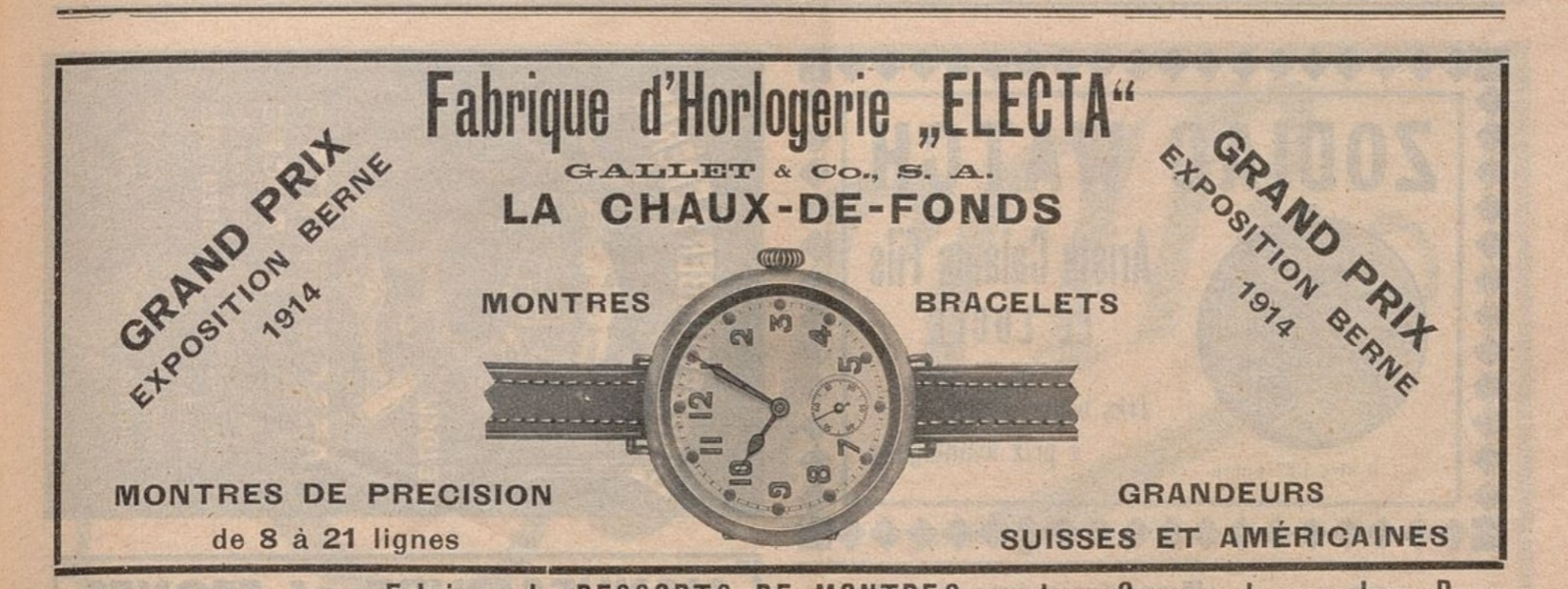

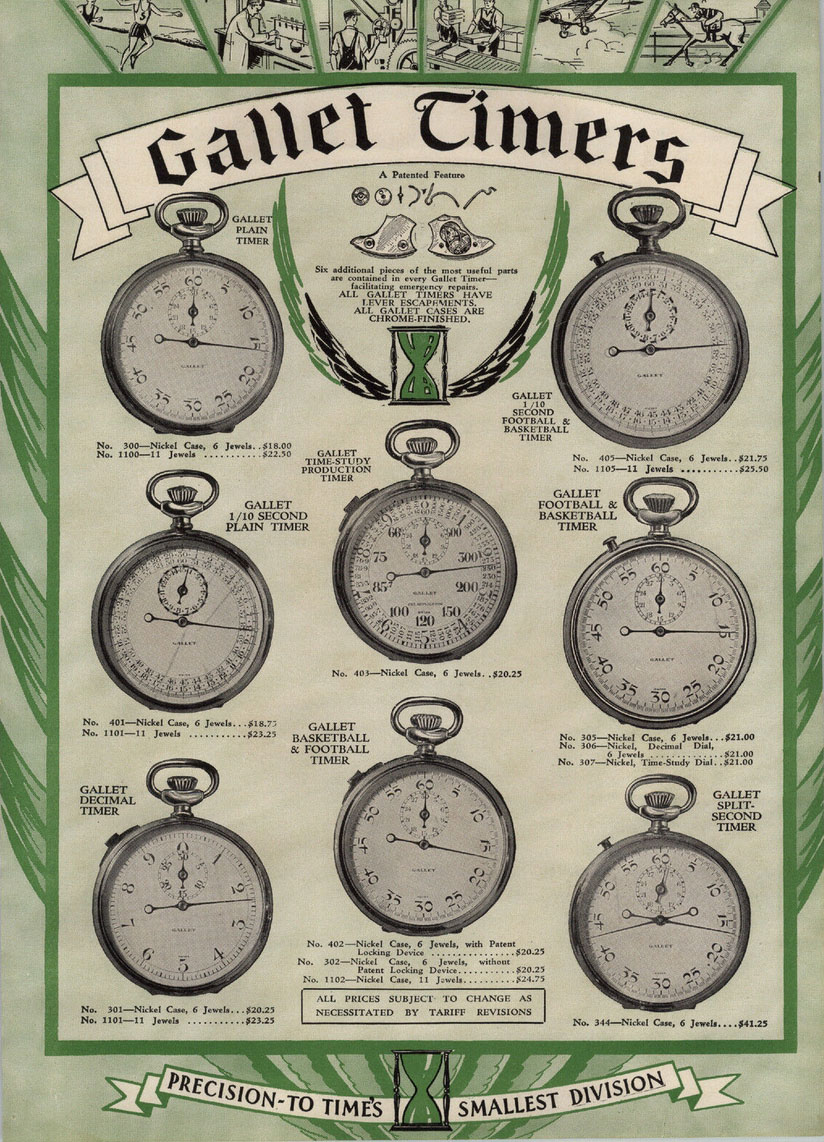
Vintage Catalog with Gallet Timers from 1930

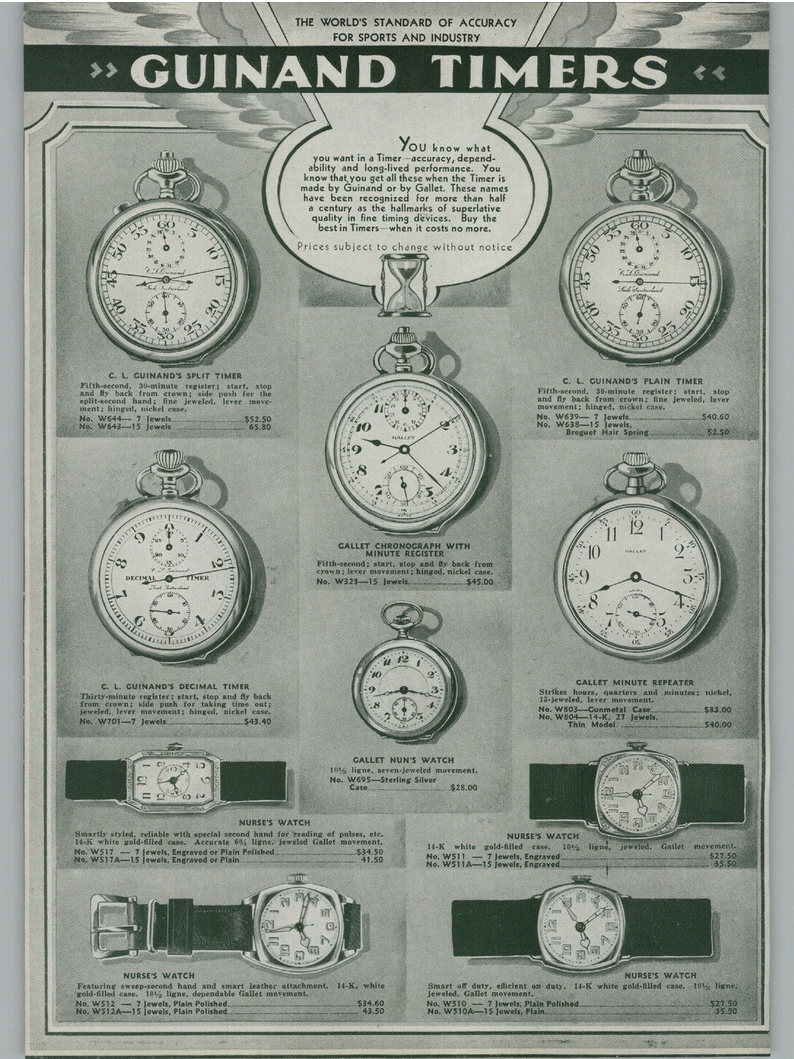
Vintage catalog with Guinand Timers from 1934

In 1916, Charles Perret died, and in 1920, George Wallace became the new partner in Gallet's U.S. operations. The post–World War I era resulted in the mid-1920s in the end of Electa's manufacturing. At that time, Gallet concentrated on supplying stopwatches, also known as timers, branded not only as Gallet but also as Galco and Guinand. A 1930s article from The Jewelers' Circular noted that Gallet "imports the large proportion of timers used in this country [U.S.]", which highlights the relevance of Gallet's operations in the United States. The company's focus on timers in the 1920s and 1930s was likely a wise business decision, as the markup on a stopwatch was sometimes "higher than that of the average watch, but certainly never less".

After Jules Racine died in 1934, George Wallace became the sole proprietor of Gallet USA. Fortunately, this did not mark the end of Gallet, quite the opposite. The rise of automobiles and aviation further favored wristwatches, which began replacing pocket watches. Advances in shock resistance, waterproofing and other features made wristwatches more reliable and more desirable. Gallet capitalized on these opportunities.

In the late 1930s, Gallet introduced some of its most iconic models - that includes the MultiChron Regulator, then the waterproof MultiChron with a clamshell case, marketed as "The First Timing Instrument of its kind in AMERICA!". In 1939, Gallet presented the Flying Officer, the world's first chronograph wristwatch featuring a multiple time zone calculator, which is considered one of the most innovative timepieces produced by the company. A very early model of the Gallet Flying Officer was presented to Senator Harry S. Truman, who later became president of the United States. The Gallet Flying Officer - described by Eric Wind on Hodinkee as "the most famous timepiece in Gallet's history"—was gifted to President Truman by Victor R. Messall, Secretary to Senator Harry S. Truman, 1935-1941 and Paul Nachtman, prominent Kansas City attorney and personal friend."

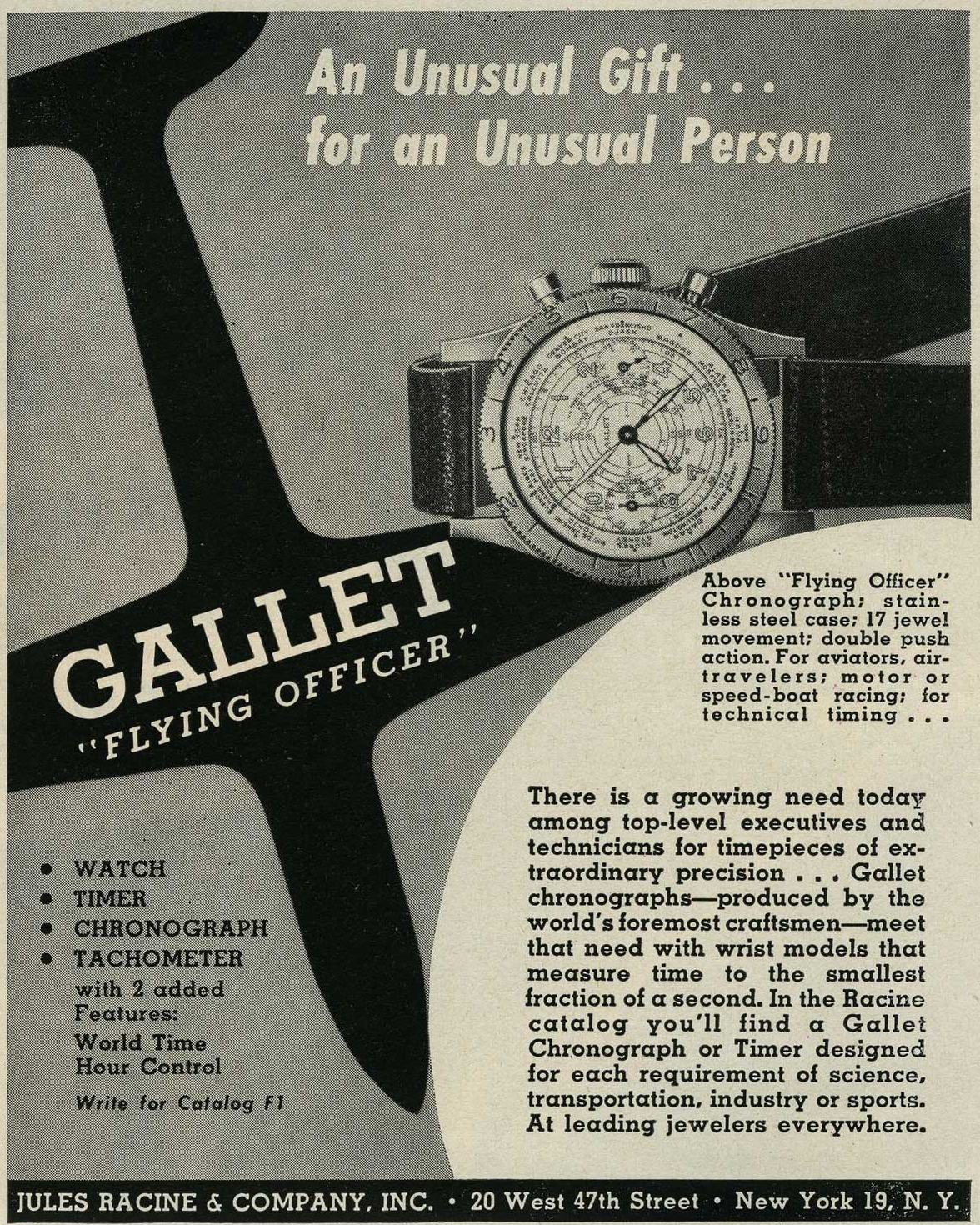

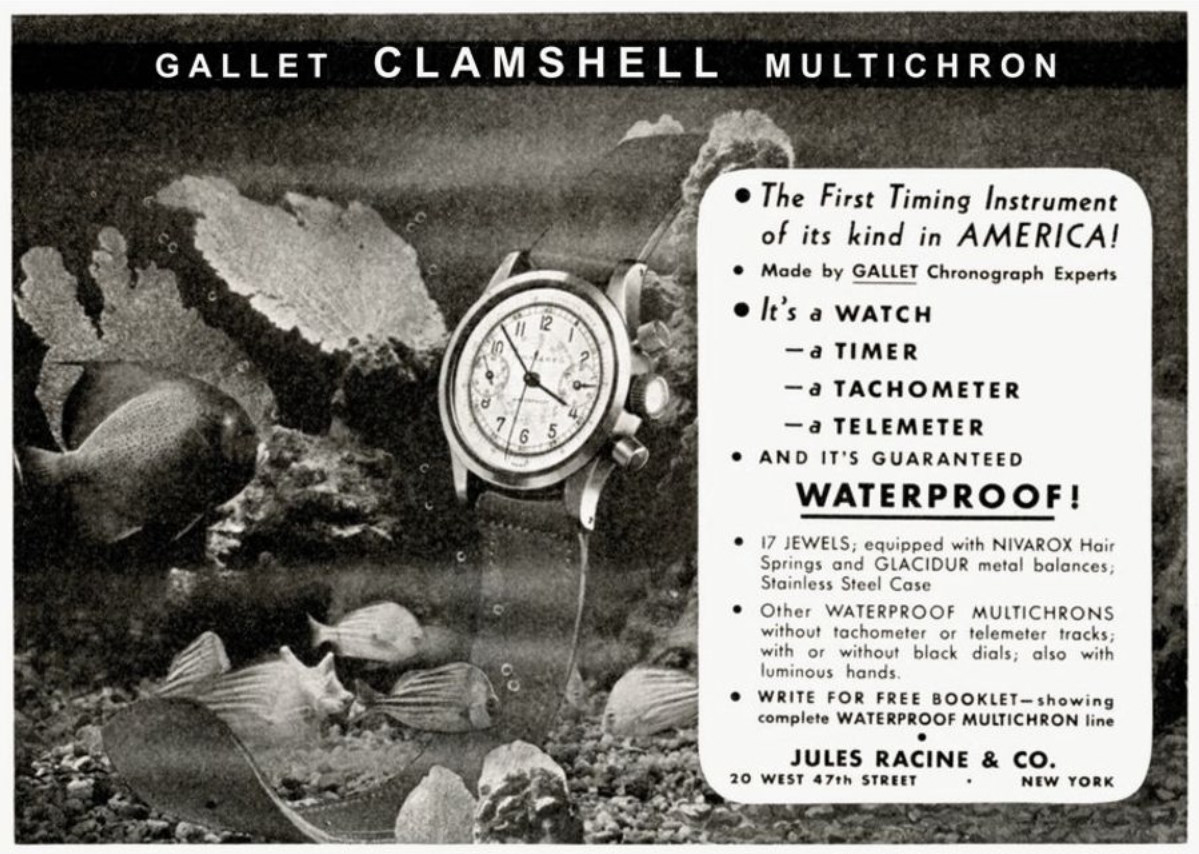

Over the next three decades, Gallet became a well-known name in the United States. Its portfolio of time-only watches from the 1950s to the 1970s was less prominent compared to its range of chronograph watches. Many Gallet chronographs were produced by contract manufacturer Excelsior Park, which was known for its reliable, high-quality movements. In addition, chronograph movements were also supplied in smaller quantities by companies such as Venus, Valjoux, Landeron Hahn, A. Schild, or even Martel, although in small quantities.

The brand ceased to be owned by the Gallet family in 1994. It subsequently remained in the hands of Swiss proprietors and, in 2024, has been acquired by Breitling.

== Acquisition by Breitling and 2026 relaunch ==
In 2025, Breitling acquired Gallet, its second heritage brand after the 2023 purchase of Universal Genève. Gallet was placed within Breitling's House of Brands, alongside Breitling and Universal Genève, and positioned as the group's entry-level sister brand, with its watches manufactured by Breitling and sold through Breitling boutiques using the company's after-sales and distribution network. Georges Kern, who led Breitling as CEO during Gallet's presentation at Geneva Watch Days 2025, became CEO of House of Brands in May 2026. The revived brand was given the creative identity "Wanderlust," referencing Gallet's history of travel, aviation and motorsport chronographs.

A new Gallet website and visual identity launched on 2 June 2026, with the full brand relaunch following in the autumn of that year, timed to the bicentenary of the company's 1826 founding. At relaunch the catalog was divided into four collections: Flying Officer, MultiChron Pilot, MultiChron Sport and Gallet Classics. All cases were produced in stainless steel, and all straps and bracelets used quick-release systems.

=== Flying Officer ===
The Flying Officer was the flagship collection, reinterpreting Gallet's historic worldtimer chronograph. The chronograph version measured 40mm and featured an outer rotating 12-hour bezel, an inner city ring bearing 24 city names, a dual-register layout with 30-minute and running-seconds counters, and luminous Arabic indices and sword hands. It was powered by the hand-wound Gallet caliber 23, based on the Sellita SW510. The collection also included a three-hand automatic version that retained the outer 12-hour bezel and inner city ring, added a date window, and used the Gallet caliber 17, based on the Sellita SW200.

=== MultiChron Pilot ===
The MultiChron Pilot was based on a 1969 model that originally used a 38mm case and a Valjoux 72 movement. The relaunched version measured 42mm and was fitted with a bidirectional 12-hour bezel, a telemeter scale, a triple-register layout with 30-minute, 12-hour and running-seconds counters, and a date window. It used the Gallet caliber 23 (Sellita SW510).

=== MultiChron Sport ===
The MultiChron Sport drew on three-register models from the 1960s. It measured 41mm and differed from the Pilot in using rectangular pushers, a smooth bezel and a tachymeter scale. It shared the triple-register configuration and the Gallet caliber 23 (Sellita SW510).

=== Gallet Classics ===
The Gallet Classics collection comprised three tribute references: the Tribute to MultiChron Yachting Big Eye, the Tribute to MultiChron 45 and the Tribute to Silverlight. Each measured 38mm and featured lyre-style lugs, dual pump pushers, a smooth bezel, a leather strap and a two-register layout with 30-minute and running-seconds counters. Produced for the relaunch and the brand's 200th anniversary, the collection used Breitling's in-house B09 caliber with a 70-hour power reserve.

== Timeless Horology Legacy ==
Leon Gallet, the son of the original Gallet founder, Julien Gallet, died in 1899. He bequeathed a large sum, part of which was used to establish the Musée international d'Horlogerie (MIH) in La Chaux-de-Fonds.

== Gallet & Excelsior Park ==
Gallet's partnership with movement manufacturer Jeanneret-Brehm & Cie dates to the early 1900s, but in the early 1940s it became transformative for both parties. Although Gallet used various contractors, Jeanneret-Brehm & Cie, which later became Excelsior Park, was by far the most important. Due to lost or destroyed pre-1980s Gallet archive records, it is not clear which watches were designed and assembled solely by Gallet, co-created with other manufacturers, or delivered fully assembled by contracted manufacturers.

=== The Sun ===
Two pocket stopwatches to time the Wright brothers flights on December 17, 1903, were made by Gallet. One is displayed at the National Air and Space Museum in Washington, D.C., while a similar model remains in the Gallet heritage collection.

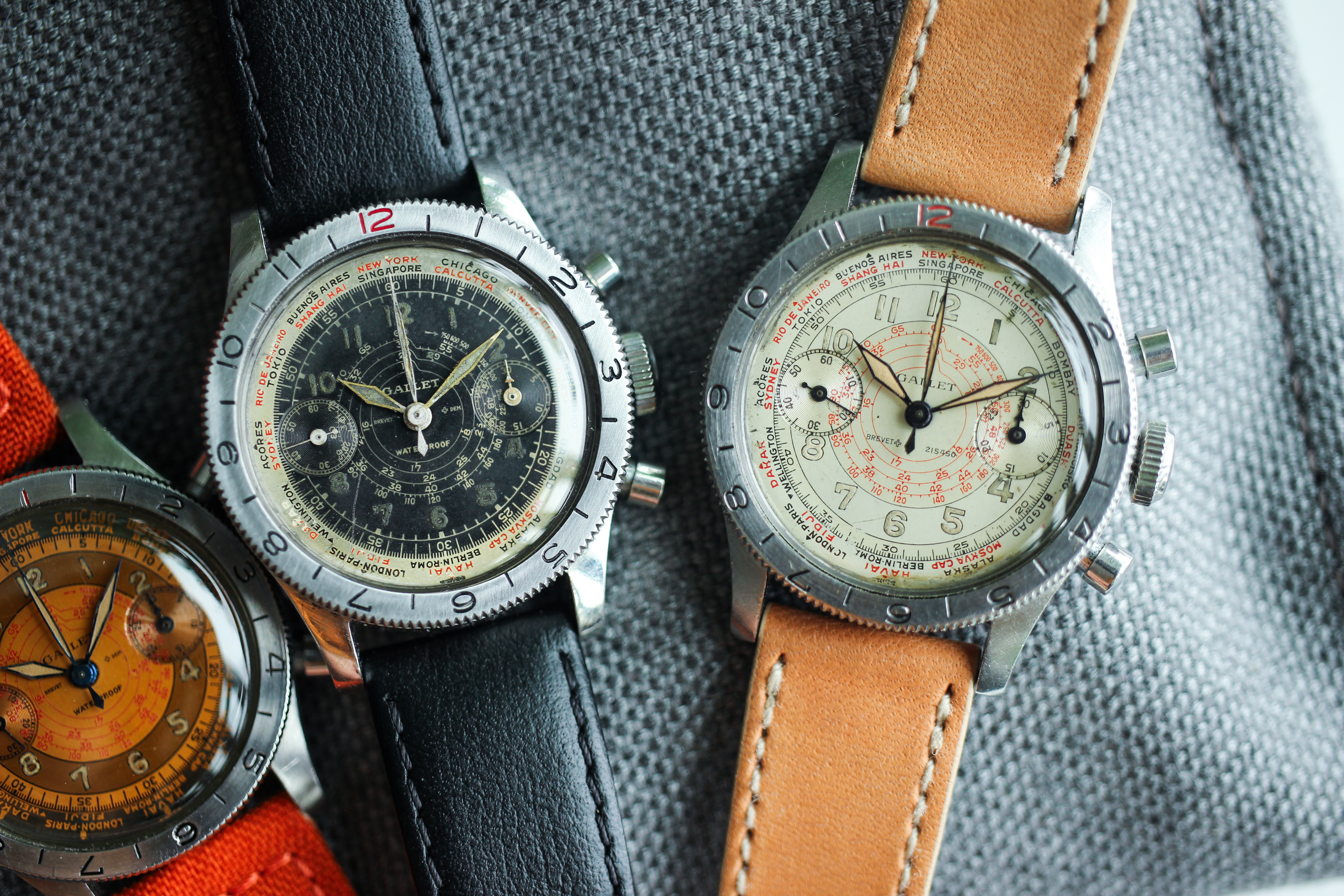

=== The Flying Officer ===
The most important watch in Gallet's history. Featuring the names of world cities arranged by time zone along the edge of the dial made it the world's first worldtimer wrist chronograph.

=== MultiChron Regulator ===
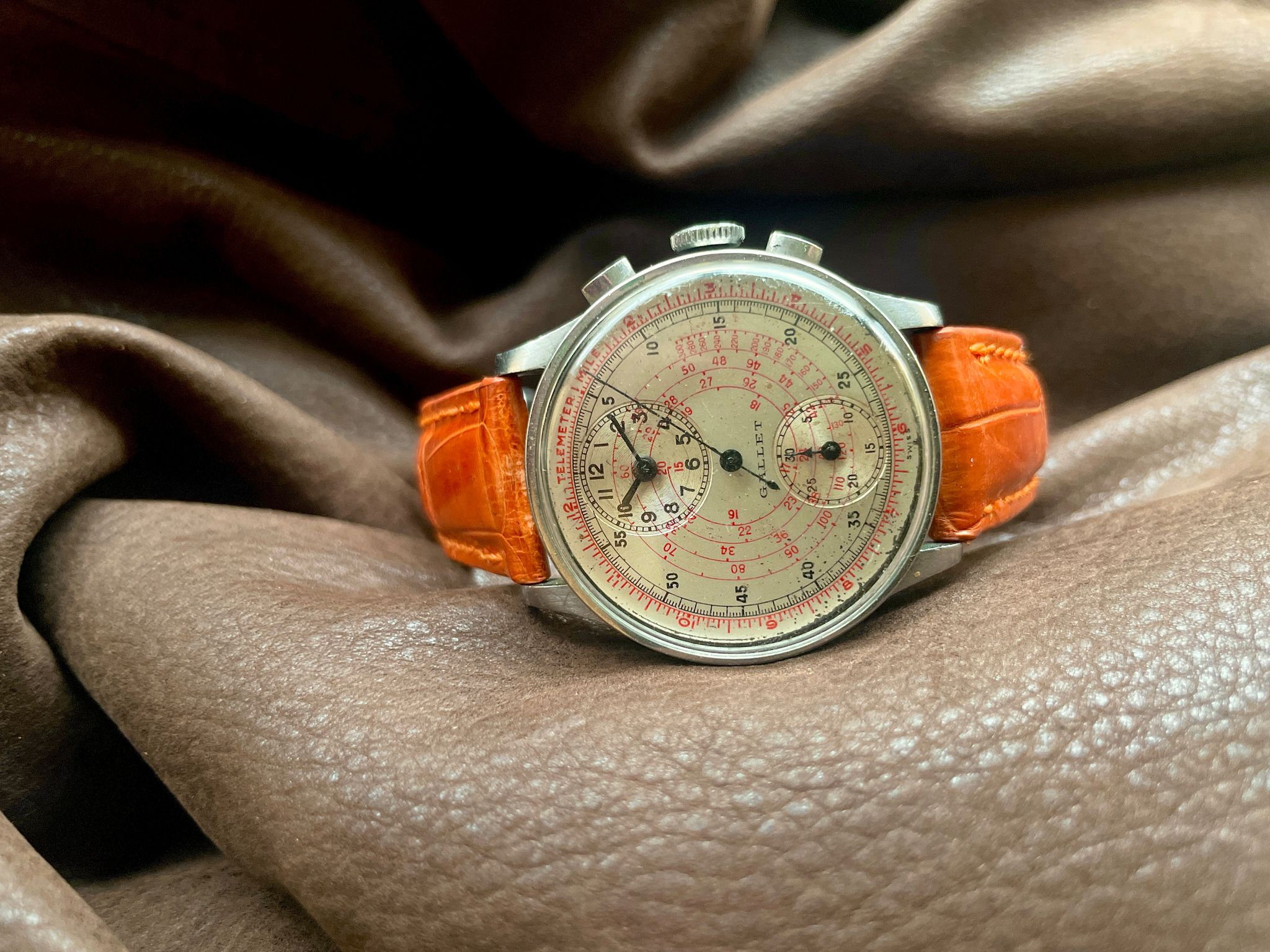

Gallet MultiChron Regulator has time-reading in a smaller top sub-register, and the minute counter at the bottom. It was designed for applications where recording events took precedence over telling the time.

=== MultiChron Waterproof "Clamshell" ===
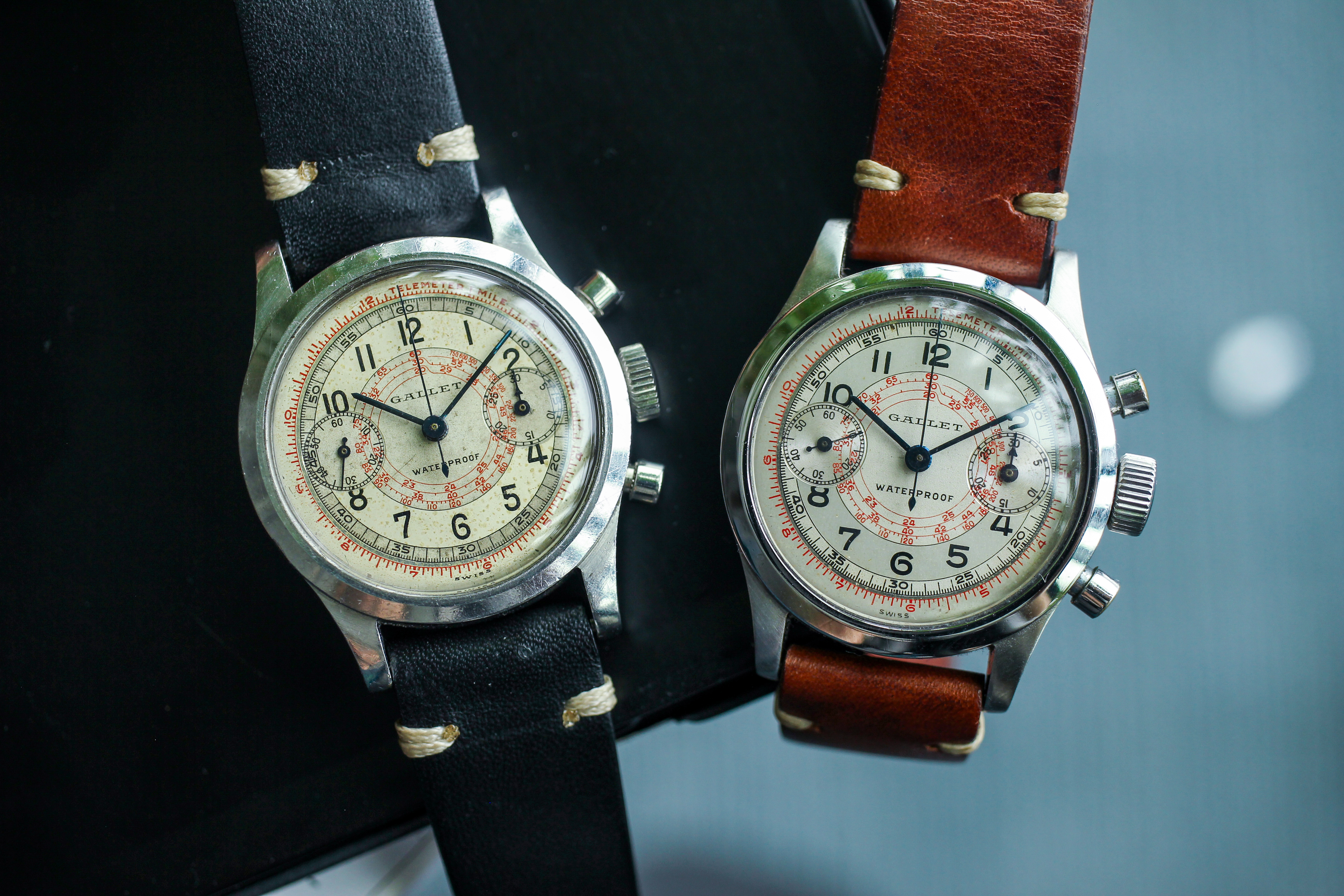

First Gallet waterproof chronograph with a special patented two-part case that holds together thanks to four screws in the foot of each of the lugs. It provided novel protection for the dial and movement from the intrusion of water, dirt, dust, and caustic chemicals.

=== MultiChron Yachting "Big Eye" ===
Version of the Gallet MultiChron Chronograph with colorful race inspired preparation countdown timer, sold with black or white dial.

=== MultiChron Decimal ===
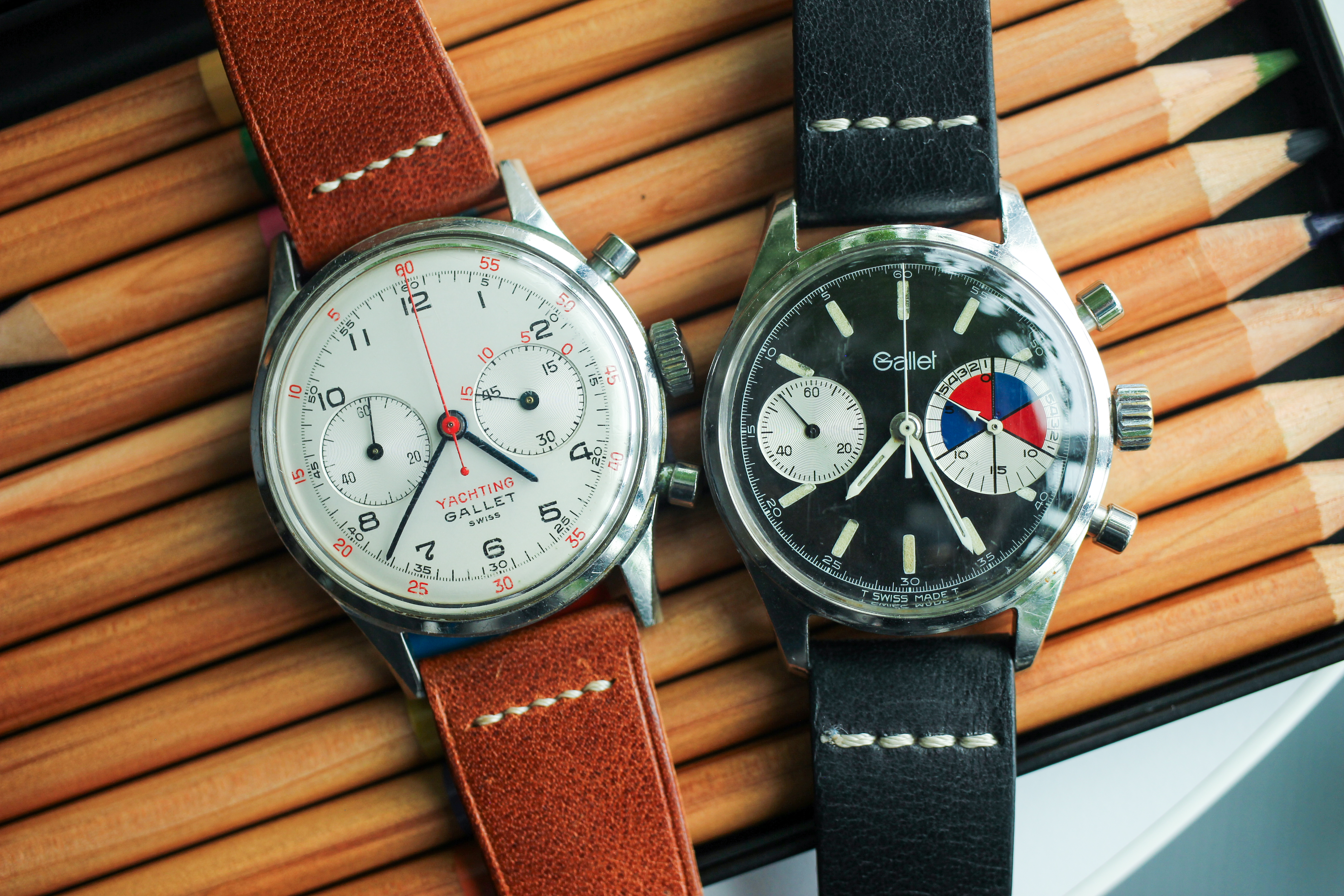

Gallet MultiChron has the decimal scale for quick calculations based on a 100-unit. It allowed workers and engineers to calculate productivity rates, such as units produced per hour or convert elapsed time into a percentage of an hour.
