= Louis Riel Sr. =

Farmer, miller and Métis leader in Canada (1817–1864)

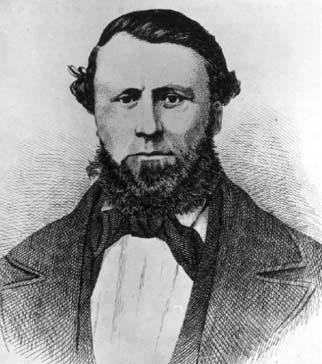
Louis Riel Sr.

Louis Riel Sr. (père) (July 7, 1817 – January 21, 1864) was a farmer, miller, Métis leader, and the father of Louis Riel.

== Life ==
Born in Île-à-la-Crosse, Rupert's Land, Riel was the eldest son of Jean-Baptiste Riel, dit L’Irlande, a voyageur, and Marguerite Boucher, a Franco-Chipewyan Métis. The Riel family moved back to Lower Canada while Louis was a child. He was educated in Quebec, learning the trade of carding wool. He joined the fur trade with the Hudson's Bay Company in 1838 and was stationed at Rainy River, Ontario, where he fathered a daughter named Marguerite in 1840. He left the HBC in 1842 and returned to Quebec with the intention of joining the priesthood at the Oblates of Mary Immaculate at Saint-Hilaire, but withdrew a year later.

He returned to the Canadian West, settling in the Red River Colony on a river lot in Saint-Boniface (now a district of modern Winnipeg, Manitoba). He married Julie Lagimodière, daughter of voyageur Jean-Baptiste Lagimodière and Marie-Anne Gaboury in January, 1844. Together they had eleven children, and by all accounts formed a devout and close-knit family.

Riel established a number of businesses in the Red River Colony. In 1847, he opened a small mill on his farm with the support of chief factor John Ballenden with the hope of establishing a fulling mill operation in the settlement. However, Riel had little success with his fulling mill. He also attempted to open and operate a carding and grist mill to grind grain and card wool for the Grey Nuns of St. Boniface, hence his title of "miller of the Seine", but to little success. Finally, in 1857, Riel attempted to establish a textile industry in the settlement, but the venture failed.

Although he was not a successful businessman, he showed great leadership within the Métis community. Louis Riel Sr. was an active participant in the Red River Métis community. Riel emerged as a Métis leader in the defence of Guillaume Sayer in his trial in May 1849. This trial was a defining moment in the fall of the Hudson's Bay Company's monopoly of the fur trade at Red River. Riel continued to fight for the rights of the Métis and was instrumental in them gaining representation on the Council of Assiniboia and for French to be used in the Assiniboia courts as well as English.

His son Louis was likely influenced greatly by his father's actions. Louis Jr. continued in his father's steps to become the most famous Métis leader and the "Father of Manitoba". When Louis Riel Sr. died January 21, 1864, his death was mourned by the entire settlement.

== See also ==
- Sara Riel
