= Sara Riel =

Canadian Métis Grey Nun (1848–1883)

- Born: October 11, 1848; St. Boniface, Red River Colony
- Died: December 27, 1883; Île-à-la-Crosse, Saskatchewan
- Occupation: Grey Nun

Sara Riel (October 11, 1848 – December 27, 1883) was the first Métis Grey Nun from Red River. She is best known as the sister of Métis leader Louis Riel. Born in 1848 in the Red River settlement to parents Jean-Louis Riel and Julie Lagimodière, she was raised in a religious household. She was educated by the Sisters of Charity of Montreal but also by her mother, who was a devoted Catholic. She was inspired to become a nun after her older brother Louis entered the seminary to become a priest. Although Louis did not become a priest, she actively took her Solemn vows in 1868. She taught languages and arts at the Grey Nuns boarding schools between 1868 and 1871, after which she became a Catholic missionary. Her family were active members in the Red River community right up to the Métis resistance. Although separated from her family, her writings showed a sympathetic view towards the resistance. Given that her brother was leading the rebellion against the government, the congregation feared for her safety and she was moved several times within a few years. Even though she took no active part in the rebellion, she provided support to her brother and acted on behalf of the Métis to local Catholic Churches. In 1871 she became the first Métis missionary from Red River and travelled to Île-à-la-Crosse in northern Saskatchewan. In 1872 Sara Riel became ill and almost died, after claiming a vision from God, Sara Riel changed her name to ‘Sister Marguerite-Marie of Alacoque’ and re-honoured her vows and commitment to the Catholic Church. She died of tuberculosis in 1884 at the age of 35.

== Early life ==
Sara Riel was born on October 11, 1848, in the Red River Colony, a small community settled via the fur trade and later expanded by the colonization of Lord Selkirk. The Red River was a secluded place in the 1850s. It could only be reached by water, leaving it near impossible to reach in the winter. The North West Company's fur trade was the primary economic resource of the region and large alliances formed between the company and the indigenous people. They taught each other important aspects of survival and adaptation concerning the buffalo hunt, agriculture, and medicine. Red River eventually became inhabited primarily by retired fur traders and their families, this demographic shift in the settlement produced a generation of mixed European-indigenous children (Métis) who maintained a unique culture.

Sara Riel's father was Jean-Louis Riel born in 1817, he was a voyageur for the North West Company, and was a 5th generation settler of French-Canadian descent. In the Red River, Jean-Louis Riel became a notable person among the Métis, encouraging the preservation of Métis heritage and to embrace their culture. He himself led many Métis movements, including one surrounding the Sayer Trial in 1849.

Her mother, Julie Lagimodière, was born in 1822 in the Red River Colony to Marie-Anne Gaboury. Lagimodière was also from a French background that integrated with the Métis culture and passed on their traditions to their children. Prior to marriage, Julie Lagimodière was planning to join the Grey Nuns. Her parents chose the marriage to Jean-Louis Riel for the purposes of financial and social security for their daughter.

Sara Riel was the fourth child born to Jean-Louis Riel and Julie Lagimodière. The first born was Louis, followed by two children who died very young. This left a bond between Louis and Sara as the two eldest children of the family. Altogether the Riel family consisted of 11 children but only 8 lived to adulthood. The Riel family were respected members of Red River, and the children lived a more privileged life which was tied to the Catholic Church.

Education was important to the Riel family and was taken very seriously by their mother, whom herself wanted to join the sisterhood prior to marriage. She taught her children the ways of the Catholic Church.

== Education ==
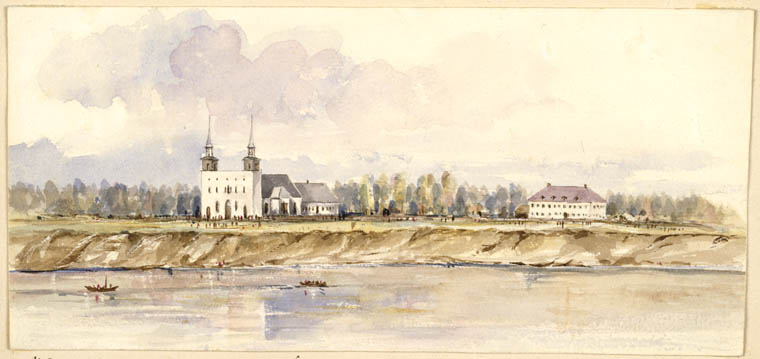
St. Boniface Cathedral and the Grey Nuns' Convent in 1858

Sara Riel was educated by the Sisters of Charity boarding school in St. Boniface. She excelled in many subjects including languages, art, and music. She also learned household skills such as cooking and cleaning along with spin, knit, sewing, and embroidering. The Grey Nuns believed that orderliness and cleanliness of the Métis were a representation of the schooling provided by the Church, therefore they encouraged the young girls to perfect their skills in household chores.

She attended school in St. Boniface from 1858 until 1866 when she was chosen to join the Grey Nuns. She entered the congregation in 1866. In 1868, she became the first Métis Grey Nun from the Red River. She was skilled in many languages including French, English, Michif, and Cree. The church were interested for her to become a teacher but also a mediator between missionaries and the indigenous.

After the death of her father in 1864, Louis became the head of the family and therefore responsible for his mother and younger siblings including Sara Riel. He and the rest of the children were forced to quit school to help with agriculture and sustaining the family home. Sara Riel was the only one who was allowed to stay in school and fulfill her mission as a nun.

== Religion ==
The Riel family was very dedicated to the education of their children. Their mother was especially dedicated to the church and instilled the will of God into her children. The family found themselves very close to Alexandre-Antonin Taché who was the head of the Catholic church in St. Boniface. It was through him that Sara Riel learned of the missionaries and Louis Riel was chosen to study for the priesthood. Louis Riel left school in 1865, abandoning all wishes to join the church. He did not return home from Montreal until after his father's death.

Following in her loving brother's footsteps Sara Riel was accepted to the Grey Nuns as a novice in 1866. Two years later in 1868, Sara Riel took her vows and joined the Catholic community. At this time, the Red River had just 26 sisters serving as missionaries, many of whom came from Quebec, who helped provide a better education for the country-born children and Métis.

On June 22, 1871, Sister Riel left for the mission of Ile-a-La-Crosse now in northern Saskatchewan. Le Métis (a local Red River newspaper) reported:

Sister Riel, sister of Mr. Louis Riel, however, had been designated to accompany her (Sister Charlebois), she is believed the first missionary from the Métis nation of Red River, given to this Great Apostolic work, and one could not find a more dignified person. A kind heart, keen intelligence, and inexhaustible charity distinguished this new missionary, her departure is a sacrifice for her family and the entire population, but at the same time it is an honour and a blessing for us.

== Red River Rebellion 1869-1870 ==
The first Métis resistance happened between 1869-1870. This happened following the establishment of the Canadian government and first signs of surveyors on the Métis land. The Hudson Bay Company sold Rupert's Land to the Canadian Government without thinking about the people who occupied it or had claims over it. Louis Riel and the other Métis believed that the creation of the Canadian state was not only a political issue but also a religious and cultural one. With determination to preserve their way of life the Métis people took arms. After stopping surveyors, the Métis of Red River formed a provisional government. At the head of the provisional government was Louis Riel.

During the conflict, the Métis took Fort Gary and executed Thomas Scott. This forced the Canadian government to acknowledge the people who lived on the land. This uprising lead to the creation of the province of as Manitoba. With Sara and Louis Riel's close relationship and tensions rising between the Métis and the government, the congregation had to take special precaution with Sara Riel.

By 1869 the congregation feared for Sister Riel's safety. With the rebellion unfolding, she was moved back to St. Boniface. Sara Riel was not impressed by the choice to move her. When Sara learned that she would have to perform manual and domestic duties, she saw that as a demotion to all the hard work she had done. Sister Riel wrote in one of her letters: “The annual autumn changes took place today on the 20th. My mission to St. Norber is over. The order placed me in the day school. I must also mend and was the community linen-- a job that occupies me continuously without fatigues”

With all the stress and chaos that the rebellion brought at home, Sister Riel still wrote actively to her brother. In the many letters sent, Sara Riel repeatedly told her brother to stay strong and fight for what they both believed in. In September 1868, she wrote: “Louis, chase away the sad and troubling thoughts to which our last meeting gave birth. Which time and the grace of God, the darkness of the present will disappear. Be confident! until then, we must do out duties. You as a fervent Christian and me as a sister of charity”

When Louis Riel was in exile to Saint-Joseph, Detroit after the first uprising, Sara Riel wrote several letters to Louis showing confidence, love and vital information that may have played a role in the future of the cause. She wrote; “truthfully I believe it would be an insult to God if I doubted for only a second the complete success of our cause... remember last winter when everything seemed over. It was God’s will that you should be overthrown, it overthrew in order to better your success.” In another letter she sent she described the heartache felt by the Métis following his departure. She wrote: ''Louis let us bury our sorrows in the wounds of his (God's) sacred heart...to love and pray, these are the arms with which we must fight to vanquish the conqueror.''

Throughout the exile, Sister Riel and Mgr Taché knew of Louis Riel's whereabouts and helped him with news and information of Canadian politics. This is about the same time that Sara Riel chose to exile herself. But like the letters to Louis Riel, they both had to wait until the time was right. Sara Riel prayed for her brother's health and safety.

Following the resistance, the people of Red River elected Louis Riel to a seat in Parliament in 1873 but he was a wanted man in Canada. The Canadian Government wanted him for the murder of Scott, which prevented him from taking his seat and delayed his return to the Red River. The last Métis resistance occurred in 1885, one year after the death of Sara Riel.

== Life after the Rebellion ==
Sara Riel was often mentioned in the writings and correspondence of the Grey Nuns. She was a very active, important and hardworking member of the clergy, who was often recognized for her actions.

In 1872, Sister Riel became ill and almost died one day after choir practice. After a miraculous recovery, she claimed to have been saved by God and her faith was solidified. She changed her name to that of a great saint: “Marguerite-Marie of Alacoque” after a vision from God.

In the 1880s her health began to decline. Sara Riel suffered from tuberculosis for many years. When her health became very serious she was given permission to return to the Red River, to be with her family in her final days. Sister Riel refused the offer. She was determined that her mission was to Île-à-la-Cross and would stay until the end.

Sara Riel died December 27, 1883, at the age of 35. She served the Catholic Church as a nun for just over 17 years, either as a teacher, a translator or a missionary. The chronicles from Île-à-la-Crosse described her last moments as ones of suffering and difficulties. One of her final letters was addressed to her brother, Louis Riel. She claimed her love for him, she reminded him to be strong and to remain dedicated to God in all his actions.

On April 27, 1885, the day after the Green Lake Post was looted during the North-West Rebellion, the Grey Nuns of Île-à-la-Crosse were terrified that Louis Riel, who had accused them of letting his younger sister die in misery would seek revenge. They fled the village along with most of the personnel and dependents of the Hudson's Bay Company Post and the Roman Catholic Mission. The large group camped on a small wooded island north of Patuanak until the crisis was over and returned to Île-à-la-Crosse on May 29, 1885.

== Legacy ==
Today, Sara Riel is not as well known nor has she had the same amount of attention from scholars as her brother.

The Riel family home still stands in Red River and has become a historical site in the province of Manitoba. It is referred to as the birthplace of the Métis resistance.

Sara Riel is seen as an important figure in the history of the Métis woman, of the Red River and in the Catholic missions in the Canadian north-west. She was an active writer, which left a larger paper trail allowing historians and scholars an insight into her life, family and the people at the time of the resistance. Until recently, her legacy had been overlooked and marginalised, with one scholar calling her "a pale representation of her brother." Nonetheless, her letters left important information on Canadian and Métis history, allowing an alternate perspective on many aspects of life of the North-West in the late nineteenth century.
