= Fort Williams (disambiguation) =

Fort Williams Park is a 90-acre park in Cape Elizabeth, Maine.

Fort Williams may also refer to:

- Castle Williams, a War of 1812 fort on Governors Island, New York City
- Fort Williams (Alabama), a War of 1812 fort near Talladega Springs
- Fort Williams (Maine), a coastal fort in Cape Elizabeth, Maine
- Fort Williams (Virginia), a Civil War fort, part of the Defenses of Washington, D.C.

== See also ==
- Fort William (disambiguation)
