= Marjorie Morgan =

Canadian writer and author

Marjorie Morgan (1915 – July 10, 2007) was a Canadian writer and author.

== Marie Ann ==
Her most noted work, the film Marie-Anne, was co-written with George Salverson and directed by Martin Walters. It starred Andrée Pelletier, John Juliani, Tantoo Cardinal and Gordon Tootoosis.

== Death ==
Morgan died of Alzheimer's disease on July 10, 2007, aged 92.
