= Marie-Anne (film) =

- Directed by: Martin Walters
- Written by: George Salverson; Marjorie Morgan
- Produced by: Fil Fraser
- Starring: Andrée Pelletier; John Juliani; Tantoo Cardinal; Gordon Tootoosis
- Cinematography: Reginald H. Morris
- Edited by: Stanley Frazen
- Music by: Maurice Marshall
- Distributed by: Les Films Mutuels
- Release date: August 2, 1978
- Running time: 88 minutes
- Country: Canada
- Languages: English; French

Marie-Anne is a Canadian drama film, directed by Martin Walters and released in 1978. The film is a historical biopic of Marie-Anne Lagimodière, the first woman of European descent to settle in Western Canada and the grandmother of Louis Riel.

The film stars Andrée Pelletier as Marie-Anne Lagimodière and John Juliani as her husband Jean-Baptiste Lagimodière. The cast also includes Tantoo Cardinal and Gordon Tootoosis.

The film garnered two Canadian Film Award nominations at the 29th Canadian Film Awards, for Best Actor (Juliani) and Best Actress (Pelletier).
