= Adam Thom =

- Born: 30 August 1802; Brechin, Scotland
- Died: 21 February 1890 (aged 87); London, England
- Occupations: teacher, journalist, lawyer, public servant, and recorder.

Adam Thom (30 August 1802 – 21 February 1890) was a teacher, journalist, lawyer, public servant, and recorder.

== Biography ==
Adam Thom was born in Brechin, in the Tayside region in Scotland. His father was Andrew Thom, a merchant, and his mother Elizabeth Bisset.

He entered the King's College in 1819 and obtained a Master of Arts in 1824. In 1840 Thom was awarded an lld by the same institution. He taught briefly at the Udny Academy, in Aberdeenshire and also in a school of Woolwich where he settled. He published a grammar of Latin entitled The Complete Gradus in 1832.

He emigrated to Lower Canada in 1832 and settled in Montreal. He began articling in the law office of James Charles Grant. In January 1833, he became editor of the Settler, or British, Irish and Canadian Gazette, where he intended to inform new immigrants of the problems they would face in British North America, until its closing on 31 December 1833. The Anti-Canadian opinions he expressed in his newspaper gave him the nickname of "Dr. Slop" in the Vindicator and Canadian Advertiser edited by patriot Edmund Bailey O'Callaghan. In November 1833, he was appointed secretary of the Beefsteak Club, which gathered some of the richest merchants of Montreal.

He went back to teaching at the Montreal Academical Institution. He published a public letter addressed to Colonial Secretary Lord Stanley in 1834. In January 1835, he became editor of the Montreal Herald. He strongly opposed the policy of governor Gosford, which he judged too conciliating toward the parliamentary majority. In February 1836, he published the Anti-Gallic Letters, a collection of texts addressed to Gosford, which he originally signed under the pseudonym of Camillus in the Montreal Herald between September 1835 and January 1836.

He was admitted to the Bar of Lower Canada in 1837. On 25 August 1838, Lord Durham who replaced Gosford, appointed him assistant commissioner in the commission on municipal administration presided by Charles Buller. He became the spokesman of Durham and the paper he wrote with fellow assistant commissioner William Kennedy was included in the Report on the Affairs of British North America. In December, he embarked for England to help with the drafting of the final document.

He left England for Red River Colony to fill the position of recorder offered to him by George Simpson, governor of the Hudson's Bay Company. He was asked to reform the administration of justice, and to codify the laws of the colony.

He arrived at Red River in the Spring 1839. In 1840, the King's College made him a doctor of laws. His career as a jurist for the Hudson's Bay Company was animated. He refused to use the French language, which he knew, even though the duties of his office required it. In 1845, he condemned to death a Saulteaux Indian by the name of Capineseweet, although according to the law, all capital cases had to be tried in Upper Canada.

He entered in conflict with the Métis, which were mainly French-speaking and Catholic, when he recommended the governor Assiniboia, Alexander Christie, to repress the business of small independent fur traders on the company's territory. In consequence of the measures taken by the government, Pierre-Guillaume Sayer was tried before the court on 17 May 1849 and was declared guilty of illicit possession of furs by the jury. He was however unconditionally released and permitted to keep the furs in spite of the verdict, because the Métis who attended the trial, Louis Riel Sr. at their head, made it clear they were not going to let it happen.

The Métis submitted a petition to the governor of the Hudson's Bay Company, George Simpson, in which they asked for the resignation of Thom. During a special meeting on 31 May 1849, the Council of Assiniboia arrived to a compromise with Thom, who agreed to make use of the French language in the performance of his duties. He however continued to displease a good part of the population of River Red and in the autumn of 1850, Louis Riel Sr. again requested his resignation. On 10 April 1851, Simpson informed Thom that he was relieved of his duties as recorder. Many of his duties were assumed by John Black, his former deputy. He however kept the title of clerk of the Court of Assiniboia and even continued to receive the same annual salary of £700.

He left Red River for Edinburgh in 1854. In 1865, he settled in London. He died in that city on 21 February 1890. His son, Adam Bisset Thom, inherited his fortune.

== Works ==
- The Complete Gradus; Comprising the Rules of Prosody, Succinctly Expressed and Rationally Explained, on a New Plan;..., London, 1832
- Letter to the Right Hon. E. G. Stanley, His Majesty's Principal Secretary of State for the Colonies, Montréal, 1834
- Review of the Report made in 1828 by the Canada Committee of the House of Commons, Montréal, 1835
- On the Canada Committee of 1828, Montréal, 1835
- Remarks on the Petition of the Convention, and on the Petition of the Constitutionalists, Montréal, 1835 (online)
- Anti-Gallic letters; Addressed to His Excellency, the Earl of Gosford, Governor-in-Chief of the Canadas, Montréal, 1836 (online)
- Canadian Politics, Montréal, 1836
- Cubbeer Burr, or the Tree of Many Trunks, Montréal, 1841
- The Claims to the Oregon Territory Considered, London, 1844 (online)
- A Charge Delivered to the Grand Jury of Assiniboia, 20 February 1845, London, 1848 (online)
- Chronology of Prophecy; Tracing the Various Courses of Divine Providence from the Flood to the End of Time;..., London, 1848
- A Few Remarks on a Pamphlet, entitled "A few Words on the Hudson's Bay Company"; in a letter to Alexander Christie..., London, 1848
- Barrow in Furnace; No. I; A letter to the subscribers to the Common Law Fund in Overend, Gurney & Co., Limited (No. II: A letter to the Hero of the Story), London, 1869
- Overend and Gurney Prosecution; In its Relation to the Public as Distinguished from the Defendants, London, 1869
- The Prosecutor's Protest against Judicial Despotism and Forensic Monopoly: Addressed to the Lord Chief Justice of England, London, 1869
- Queen Alone, in Every Heart and On Every Tongue..., London, 1876
- Bane and Antidote Together..., A letter from an Octogenarian Advocate of Inspiration, London, 1884
- Emmanuel Alone, for his Own Sake through Time and Space Alike, London, 1885 (online)
- Emmanuel; Both the Germ and the Outcome of the Scriptural Alphabets, and the Metallic Image; With an Appendix of Individual Analogues; A Pentaglot Miniature, London, 1885
