= George Tryon Harding =

American physician and businessman

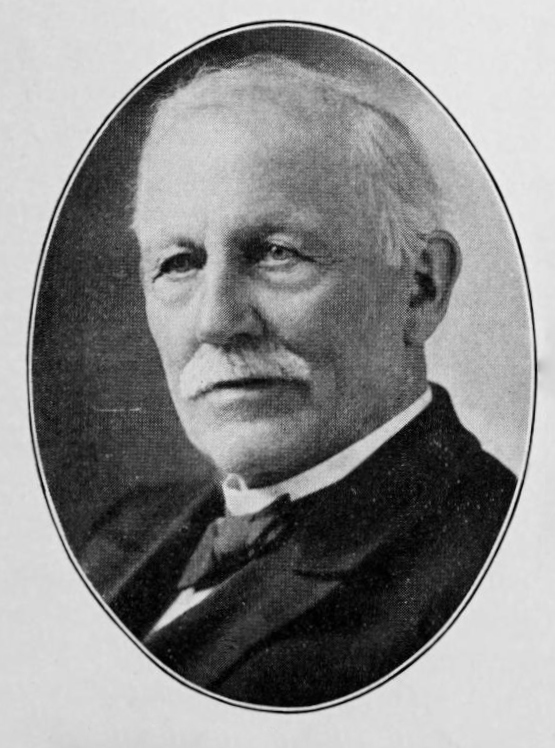
- Born: George Tryon Harding; June 12, 1843; Blooming Grove, Ohio, United States
- Died: November 19, 1928 (aged 85); Santa Ana, California, United States
- Other name: Tryon Harding
- Occupations: Physician, businessman
- Spouses: Phoebe Dickerson (m. 1864; died 1910) Eudora Kelley Luvisi (m. 1911; div. 1916) Alice Severns (m. 1921)
- Children: 8, including Warren

George Tryon Harding (June 12, 1843 – November 19, 1928), known as Tryon Harding (often misspelled "Tyron"), was an American physician and businessman who is best known as the father of Warren G. Harding, the 29th president of the United States. Harding was named in honor of his grandfather; however, he did not use "Jr." or the suffix "II" in his adult life. He was the first presidential father to outlive his son, and the second presidential father (after Nathaniel Fillmore) to live through his son's presidency. In his biography of Warren G. Harding, Charles L. Mee describes Tryon Harding as "a small, idle, shiftless, impractical, lazy, daydreaming, catnapping fellow whose eye was always on the main chance".

== Early life and military service ==
Harding was born on June 12, 1843, in Blooming Grove, Ohio, to Mary Anne Harding (née Crawford) and Charles Alexander Harding. Both his parents were born in Pennsylvania to old-stock American families, and he was named after his paternal grandfather, George Tryon Harding I. Harding was the third-born of ten children, of whom he and five sisters lived to adulthood. His father was a reasonably prosperous farmer, and was able to afford to send his son to school. Harding began his education at a private school run by his aunt, and then at the age of 14 progressed to Iberia College. He graduated in 1860 with a bachelor's degree, and then began teaching at a small school just outside of Mount Gilead, Ohio. Harding returned to school after a year, enrolling at the Ontario Academy.

In 1863, Harding enlisted in the Union Army as a fifer in the 96th Ohio Infantry. However, he caught pleurisy soon afterward, and received a medical discharge a few weeks later without ever having left the state. After a period of recuperation at his parents' home, on May 2, 1864, Harding re-enlisted as a drummer in the 136th Ohio Infantry Regiment. His unit shipped out to Virginia in May 1864, where he was stationed at Fort Williams and served during Early's attack on Washington. While on a furlough, he and two of his friends visited the White House in Washington, D.C., where they requested and received a meeting with President Abraham Lincoln. In August 1864, Harding was again taken ill, this time with typhoid fever. He received a second medical discharge two weeks later.

== Later life ==
After returning from the war, Harding resumed his teaching career and also began building a house, which was completed in 1865. In 1869, having grown tired of teaching, he began training as a physician, buying a set of second-hand medical books and accompanying the local doctor on his rounds. The following year, Harding attended a semester of medical school at Cleveland Homeopathic Hospital College, which allowed him to receive a licence to practice medicine from the Northwest Medical Society. He returned to the college in 1873 for an additional semester, after which he was granted his Doctorate of Medicine (M.D.).

Late into his seventh decade, Harding practiced as a country doctor, but eventually lost interest in the profession. His earnings were rarely constant (often received in farm produce rather than cash), and he often had to rely on his wife's income as a midwife. In later life, he frequently borrowed money from family, including his children. At various times, Harding supplemented the income from his medical practice by buying and selling farm equipment, speculating on land, selling insurance, managing a hardware store, and farming, almost all of which he did unsuccessfully. Arguably his one successful investment was his purchase of a half-interest in a local newspaper, the Caledonia Argus.

When his son won the Republican Party's nomination at the 1920 presidential election, Harding received a surge of interest that lasted for several months. During the campaigning period, Warren's campaign touted Tryon's Civil War service, with photographs run showing him in his Grand Army of the Republic uniform. Harding gave interviews in which he incorrectly boasted that he would be the first man to see his son elected president, and also proclaimed that he had "a few scores to settle." Reporters eventually tired of his arrogant manner and rambling anecdotes, although he re-entered the limelight after the president's death in office in 1923. He participated in his son's funeral—the only father of a president to do so. He also survived his daughter-in-law, Florence Kling Harding, when she died in 1924. Over the next few years, when his son's reputation diminished due to corruption scandals during his administration, Harding came to shun publicity. He died at Santa Ana, California, in November 1928, at the age of 85, outliving his son by five years.

== Marriages and family ==
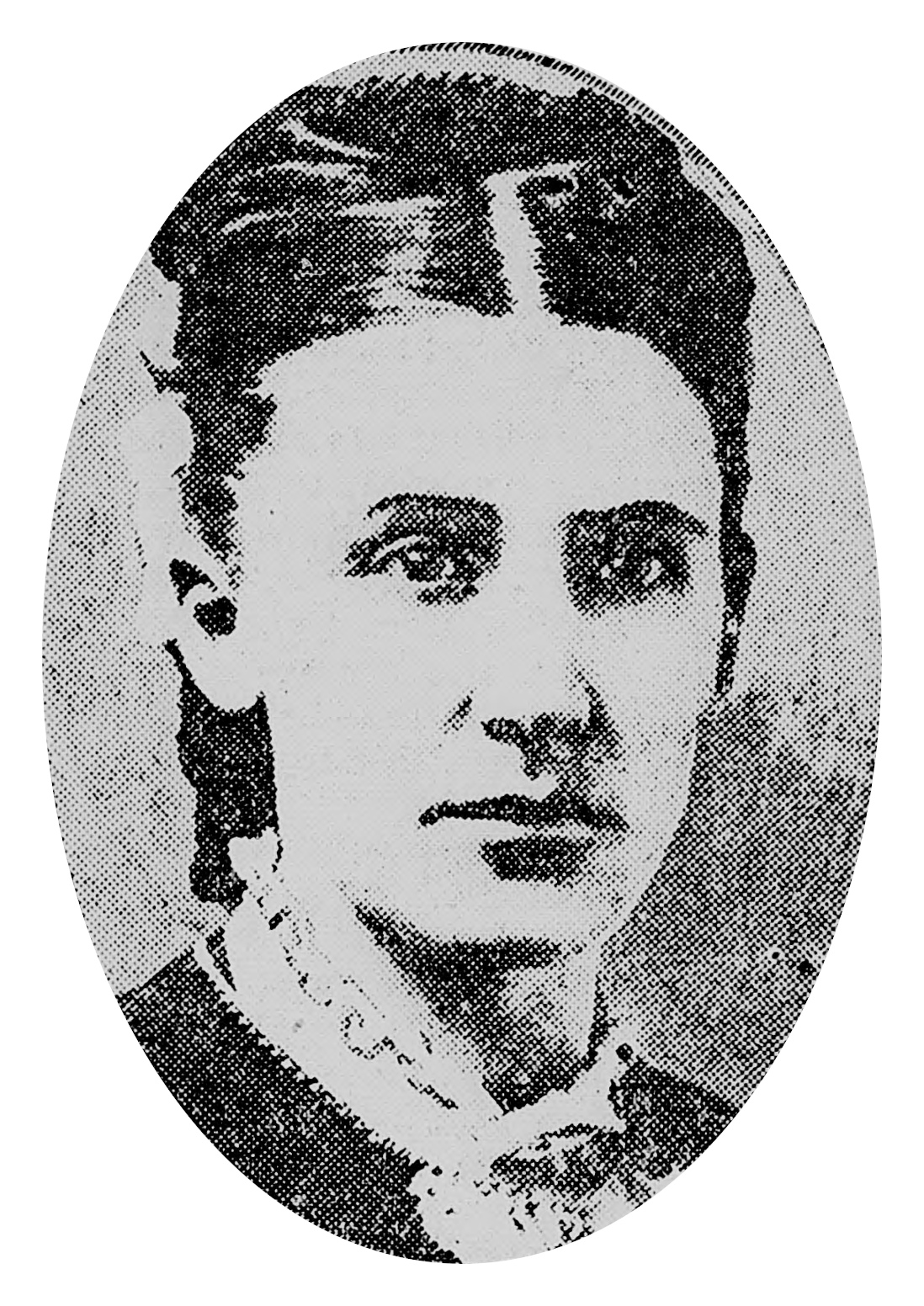
Phoebe Dickerson Harding, mother of Warren G. Harding

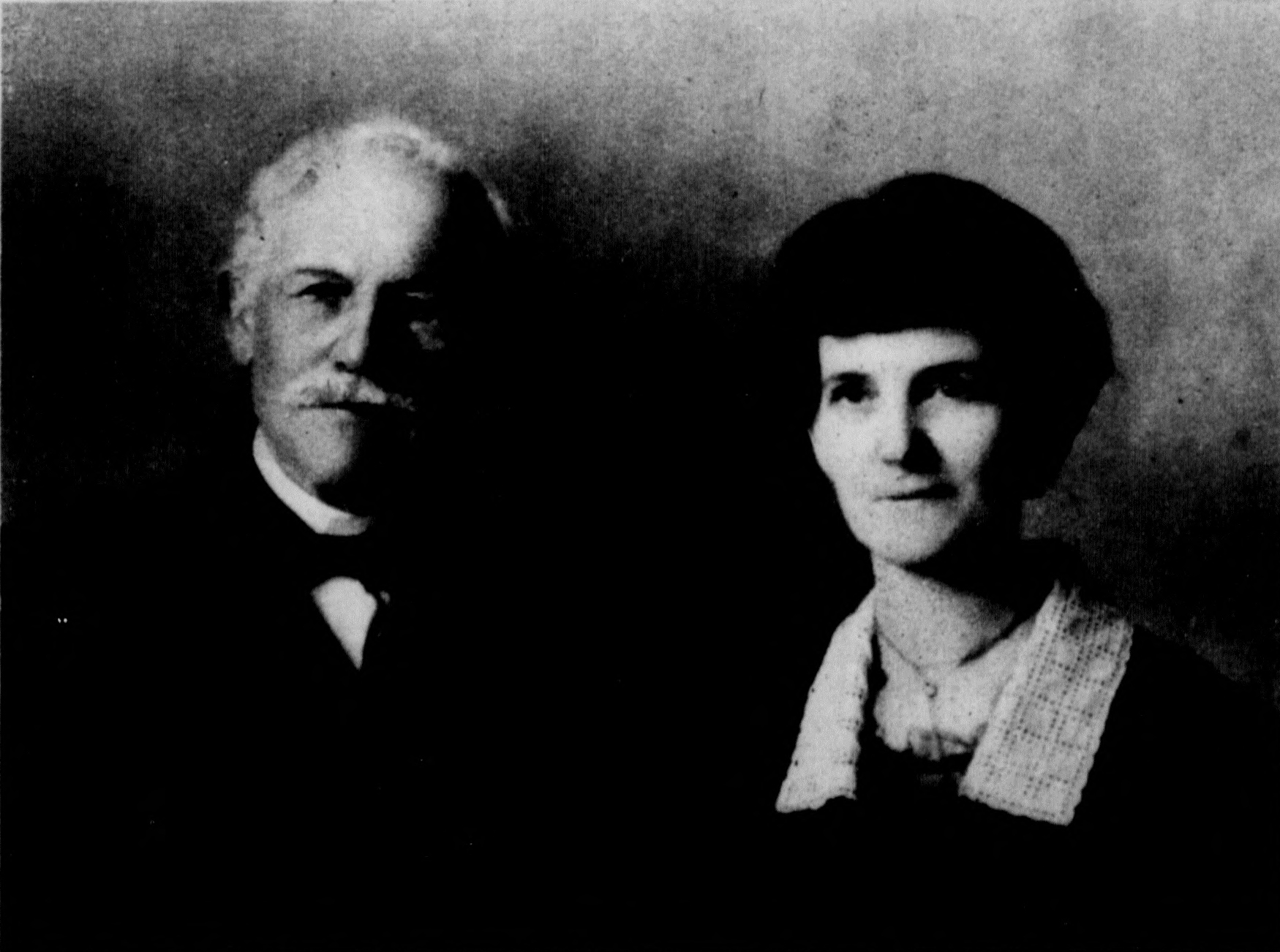
Harding with his third wife, Alice Severns, in 1921

Harding married Phoebe Dickerson on May 7, 1864. He had first met her at his aunt's school, and (despite already being a college graduate) later followed her to the Ontario Academy, where they became secretly engaged. They finally eloped just before Harding was due to ship off to Virginia, marrying in Galion, Ohio, at the home of the local Methodist minister. His wife's parents did not learn of their marriage until Harding returned from the war.

Phoebe died in 1910, and Harding remarried on November 23, 1911, to Eudora Kelley Luvisi, a 43-year-old widow. They divorced in 1916, and on August 12, 1921, Harding married for a third time, to his office secretary, Alice Severns. They remained married until his death. Harding's second and third wives were both 26 years younger than he, making them even younger than his son Warren.

Harding and his first wife had eight children together (three boys and five girls), born over a 14-year period. Six of the children, Warren, Charity, Mary, Daisy, George Tryon Harding II, and Caroline lived to adulthood. Two other children, Charles and Almira, died young. Harding's oldest child, Warren Gamaliel Harding, became (in order) a state senator, Lieutenant Governor of Ohio, U.S. senator from Ohio, and finally President of the United States. President Harding had a reasonably close relationship with his father, especially in his youth, and was grateful to him for providing a college education and teaching him the basics of the newspaper business.
