= Julie Lagimodière =

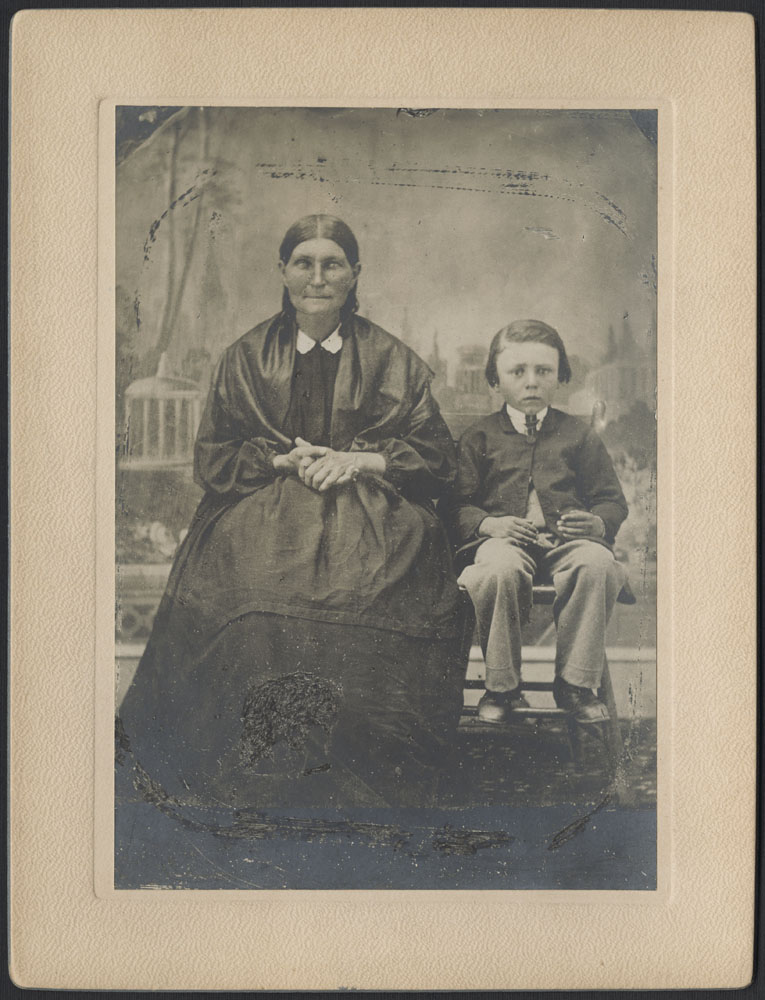
Julie Lagimodière, mother of Louis Riel, with her son Alexandre Riel in Manitoba.

Julie Lagimodière was the daughter of Marie-Anne Gaboury, the first white woman in the Canadian West, and the mother of Louis Riel, a Métis leader and the founder of Manitoba. She was born either July 26, 1820 or July 23, 1822 in the Red River Colony. She died in Saint Boniface, Manitoba in May 1906.

Julie Lagimodère was deeply religious throughout her life, rejecting the first marriage proposal from Louis Riel Sr. because she wanted to be a nun. Julie's devotion to Catholicism had a profound impact on her son Louis and her daughter Sara, who became a Grey Nun. She eventually acquiesced to her parents wishes and married Riel Sr. on January 21 of 1844. The Riels went on to have eleven children, only eight of which survived to adulthood. Their first home was on the Lagimodière lot in St. Boniface. She gave birth to Louis Riel on October 2, 1844. She gave birth to two daughters, Élie and Philomène between 1845 and 1847; neither survived. Sara and Marie followed in 1848 and 1850, around the time the family moved to St. Vital. Octavie, Eulalie and Charles were born there between 1851 and 1854. Julie had her last two children, Henriette and Alexandre in 1861 and 1863.

Louis Riel Sr. died in 1864 and a short while later the family moved again to the current location of the Riel House National Historic Site. The lot was given to her by Archbishop Taché, who also encouraged her son Louis to study in Quebec in 1854.

Julie outlived four of her adult children. Marie died of influenza in 1873, Charles of fever in 1875 and Sara of consumption in 1883. Her eldest child Louis Riel was executed for treason in 1885 after the North-West Rebellion; his final letter was to his mother. After Louis' wife Marguerite died of tuberculosis in 1886 Julie raised her grandchildren Jean and Marie-Angélique. She died in 1906 and was buried with her husband and eight children in the Saint Boniface Cathedral.
