= Jean-Baptiste Lagimodière =

Canadian fur trader

- Born: 25 December 1778; Trois-Rivières, Quebec
- Died: 7 September 1855 (aged 76); Saint-Boniface, Manitoba
- Occupation: Trapper

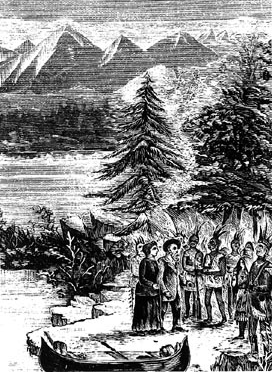
Meeting of Marie-Anne Gaboury and Jean-Baptiste Lagimodière with First Nations people, c. 1807

Jean-Baptiste Lagimodière (25 December 1778 in Trois-Rivières, Quebec – 7 September 1855 in Saint-Boniface, Manitoba) was a French-Canadian hunter and trapper employed in the fur trade by the Hudson's Bay Company in Rupert's Land.

Lagimodière is noted both as the grandfather of Métis leader Louis Riel, and as the husband of Marie-Anne Gaboury, the first woman of European descent to travel to and settle in western Canada. She was the mother of daughter Julie, who gave birth to Louis Riel at Winnipeg in 1844.

Lagimodiere and Marie-Anne travelled across the prairies after their marriage in 1806, eventually having what some say was the first Euro-Canadian child in Manitoba in January 1807 and then the first in what is now the province of Saskatchewan as well, when they lived along the Saskatchewan River. They lived a couple years at Fort Edmonton, 1808-1811. During this time the fort moved from Rossdale downstream to near Smoky Lake.

The Lagimodières were also, in 1812, the first settlers at the Red River Colony near modern Winnipeg, Manitoba. The Hudson's Bay Company, for whom he worked, supported the creation of the Selkirk Settlement. When its leader Colin Robertson heard that the North West Company was planning an attack on the settlement, he dispatched Lagimodiere to travel to Montreal to alert Lord Selkirk in Montreal. Lagimodiere did the 3,000-kilometre trip in five months, earning the Earl's gratitude and receiving a grant of land on the site of present-day Winnipeg. His information allowed reinforcements to be sent west - albeit too late to avoid the colony's temporary abandonment. The reinforcements, while on its way, captured Fort William, where it found and freed Lagimodiere who had been captured on his way back home.

The family settled on the land grant in the Red River Valley, establishing a large farm where he died in 1855.

He is portrayed by John Juliani in the 1978 film Marie-Anne. The Winnipeg section of Manitoba Highway 59, known formally as Winnipeg Route 20, in the eastern part of the city, is named Lagimodière Boulevard after him.
