= National Committee of the Métis =

Committee formed by Louis Riel for the Métis

The National Committee of the Red River Métis was brought together and made a committee on October 16, 1869. John Bruce was elected as president and Louis Riel as secretary. The committee was formed with the support of Father Ritchot. Ritchot hoped to minimize the independent actions of the federal authorities involving the management of the territory of the Red River Colony. The committee ordered that Governor William McDougall was not allowed entry.
