= Statue of Louis Riel =

Sculpture of Louis Riel by John Cullen Nugent

Riel
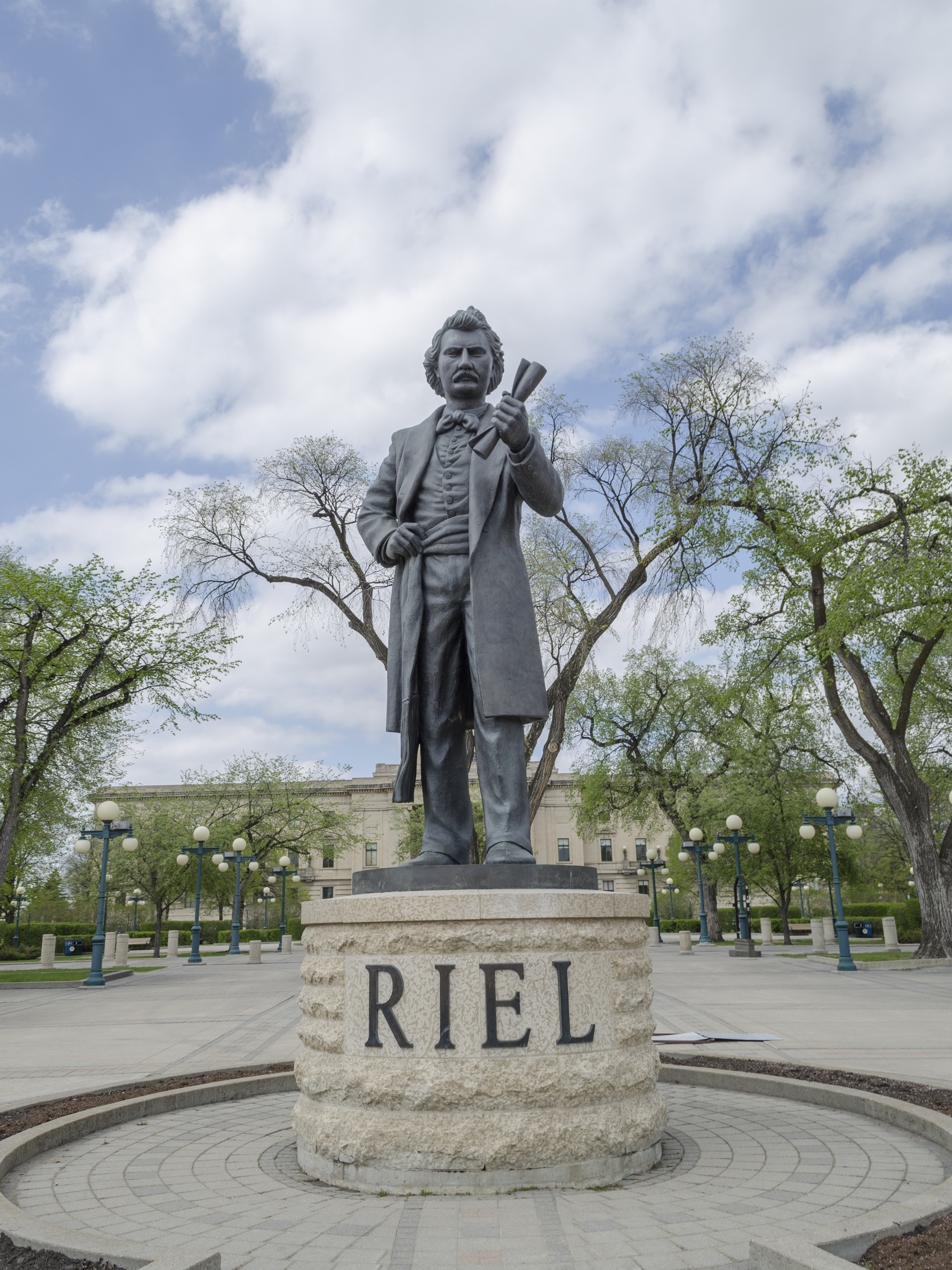
- Artist: Miguel Joyal
- Year: 1996
- Medium: Bronze sculpture
- Subject: Louis Riel
- Dimensions: 3.5 m (11 ft)
- Location: Manitoba Legislative Building grounds, Winnipeg, Manitoba, Canada; 49.882748°N 97.145915°W

Other details
- Cost: $200,000 CAD
- Commissioned by: Manitoba Metis Federation

The Louis Riel sculpture is a monument to Louis Riel located on the grounds of the Manitoba Legislative Building in Winnipeg. Commissioned by the Manitoba Metis Federation (MMF) and sculpted by Miguel Joyal, the statue is located on the building's south grounds and faces the Assiniboine River.

Standing at 3.5 metres (11 ft) tall, the statue depicts Riel dressed in a 19th-century shirt, overcoat, trousers, and moccasins. Riel is shown standing with clenched fists, with his left hand holding a parchment to represent the Manitoba Act.

The cost for the statue was estimated to be $200,000, and was to be shared equally between the MMF and the Province of Manitoba. In 1994, the MMF failed to raise the necessary amount, and the federal government contributed $15,000.

== Previous statue and controversy ==
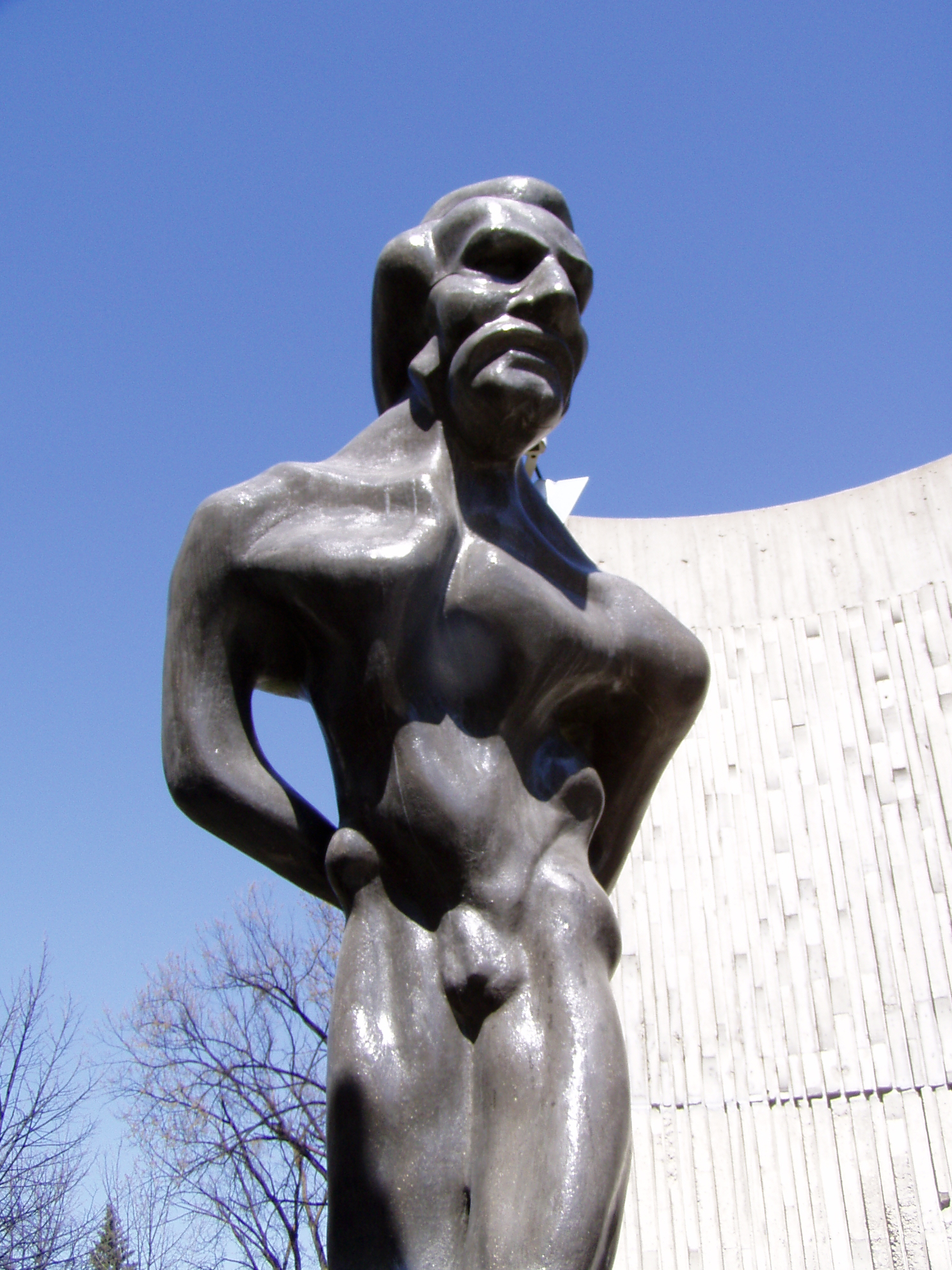
Original Louis Riel statue, now at the Université de Saint-Boniface

The current statue replaced an existing statue of Riel. Installed in 1970 and unveiled in 1971, the previous statue was conceived by Marcien Lemay and Étienne Gaboury. It depicted Riel in the nude, with a distorted and compressed body, and was considered controversial. By 1991, the Manitoba Metis Federation and the Government of Manitoba agreed to create a second statue to replace the one by Lemay and Gaboury due to sustained criticism and repeated vandalism. The controversial statue was relocated to the grounds of the Université de Saint-Boniface in 1995.

== Construction ==
In April 1995, the maquette of Riel was conceived in approximately two weeks. Once accepted and officially announced as the winning model on 3 May 1995 the bronze construction took place in Toronto at the MST Bronze Limited Art Foundry.

The first step was to mount the steel armature by welding together the dominant elements of the composition (legs, arms, head). The armature was fastened to a portable base with wheels and surrounding it a wooden structure (roof and ramps) was installed allowing the sculptor to easily access the various sections.

Afterwards, two blocks of XPS foam measuring two feet by four feet and eight feet in height were glued to the ‘legs’ of the armature. Smaller pieces of foam were added to envelop the remaining framework. In order to respect the proposed proportions Joyal proceeded to divide the maquette as well as the foam frame into five equal parts (vertically and horizontally) so that one inch of the maquette would represent one foot of the final sculpture. Various types of saws were used to carve Riel’s figure. On October 26, 1995 winterstone, a type of plaster, was applied to the carving.

Due to the large size of the sculpture (16 feet 8½ inches) the lost-wax casting method was not used. Instead, the statue was divided into ten sections. A mold for each of these segments was produced using the sand casting method (sand mixed with epoxy forms to the outer shape of the statue and then hardens creating the mold). Graphite was dusted over the foam to prevent it from adhering to the sand cast. Sand casting requires less welding and repairing at the end of the process.

The inside of each sand cast mold was layered with plasticine (¼ inch thick). The application of graphite to the sand cast and the plasticine prevented the materials from bonding. A second sand cast was made over the plasticine. This process created a void, which would be filled with melted bronze. To avoid the formation of air pockets air vents were installed before pouring the bronze. The bronze sections were welded together and sandblasted (using a wire brush) to clean the sculpture and produce a uniform texture. Lastly, the bronze was coated with a patina to protect it from the elements of the outdoors.

In a large wooden crate the finished sculpture was transported from Toronto to Winnipeg and fastened to its base with the help of epoxy cement and 1¼ inch stainless steel pins. The cement base was previously installed directly onsite. It measures six feet in height and is plated with Manitoba’s very own Tyndall Stone.

Joyal chose to dress the subject in attire that corresponds with the photographs of Riel. The artist added the moccasins, the sash, as well as the Manitoba Act in order to shed light on Riel’s ethnic background and his role in the community. The sculpture’s physical position was designed to convey power and leadership.
