= Miguel Joyal =

- Born: Winnipeg, Manitoba
- Known for: sculptor

Miguel Joyal is a Canadian-born artist and sculptor.

== Works ==
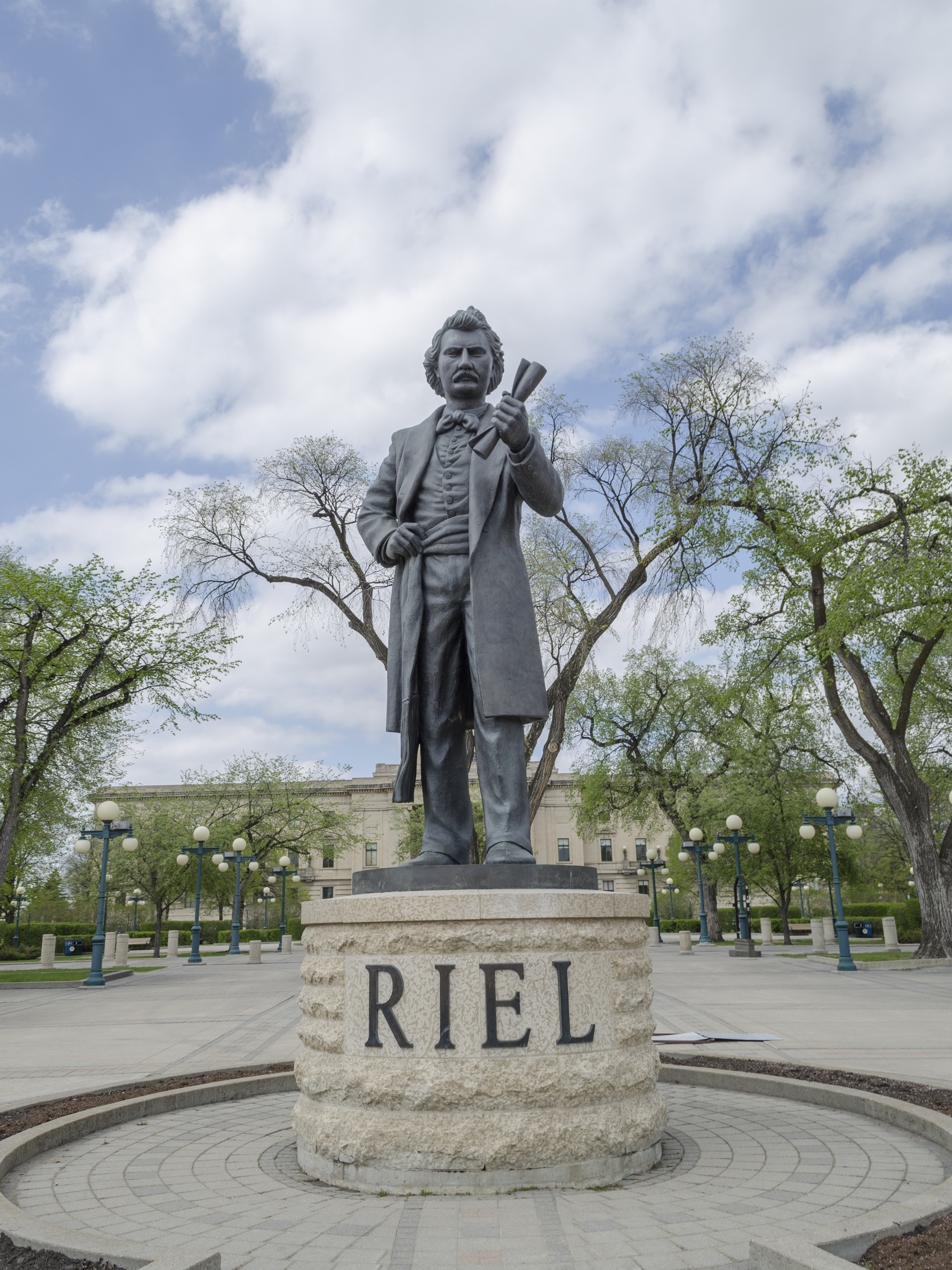
Louis Riel statue at the Manitoba Legislative Grounds

Joyal created the Louis Riel sculpture located at the Manitoba Legislative Building. Completed in 1996, the sculpture was commissioned by the Manitoba Metis Federation, and replaced an existing statue of Riel from 1971, which had garnered controversy.

Joyal was commissioned to contribute a sculpture to the University of Manitoba campus. Unveiled in 2011, the sculpture represents Louis Riel as a scholar learning the "laws of the land".

In January 2018, Joyal completed a statue of Saint Boniface activist Georges Forest for placement in Winnipeg's Provencher Park. The statue was initially rejected by the committee overseeing the project. The bronze bust will stand just under 1 metre (3.3 ft) high, weigh approximately 73 kilograms (161 lb), and rest on a granite base atop a concrete platform. The entire structure will be just over 2 metres (6.6 ft) tall.

Joyal has also created sculptures from snow and styrofoam for Winnipeg's annual winter Festival du Voyageur, as well as wood chieftains and Madonnas, stone figurines and eagle heads, and a nearly life-size airplane.
