= Fort William =

Fort William may refer to:

== Places ==
=== Canada ===
- Fort William, Ontario, a Canadian city which, together with Port Arthur, became part of Thunder Bay in 1970
  - Downtown Fort William, Ontario, a neighborhood of Thunder Bay
  - Fort William (federal electoral district), a related Canadian federal electoral district
  - Fort William (provincial electoral district)
  - Fort William and Rainy River, a federal electoral district from 1917 to 1925
  - Fort William First Nation, an Ojibwa First Nation reserve
  - Fort William Gardens, a multi-purpose arena in Thunder Bay, Ontario
  - Fort William Historical Park, historical re-creation of the original Fort William (Ontario) on the Kaministiquia River
- Fort William, Newfoundland
- Fort William, a community and historic site along the Ottawa River in Sheenboro, Quebec

=== Ghana ===
- Fort William, Ghana, a fort in Anomabu, Central Region, built in the 18th century
- Fort William Lighthouse, in Cape Coast, Central Region, Ghana, built in the 19th century, now used as a lighthouse

=== United Kingdom ===
- Fort William, Scotland, a town in Scotland
  - Fort William railway station

=== United States ===
- Fort William, Massachusetts (also called Castle William), a former name for the current Fort Independence in Boston Harbor
- Fort William (Salem, Massachusetts), 1643 fort on the site of Fort Pickering
- Fort Amsterdam (once named Fort William), New York City
- Fort William (Colorado), a frontier trading post also known as Bent's Old Fort
- Fort William (Kentucky), frontier fort 1785
- Fort William (Oregon), a fur trade outpost in Oregon Country
- Fort William (Wyoming), a frontier trading post later renamed Fort Laramie
- Fort William (Pennsylvania), second name for Fort Lebanon, changed after 1757

=== Elsewhere ===
- Fort William, India, a fort in Kolkata
- Fort William Point (Robert Island), a conspicuous headland on the Coppermine Peninsula of Robert Island in Antarctica

== Other uses ==
- Fort William College, based in Fort William, India from 1800 to 1854
- Fort William F.C., a football club based in Fort William, Highland
- Fort William Shinty Club, a shinty team
- Supreme Court of Judicature at Fort William, Calcutta, 1774-1862

== See also ==
- Fort Williams (disambiguation)
