= Carolyn Harding Votaw =

American missionary (1879–1951)

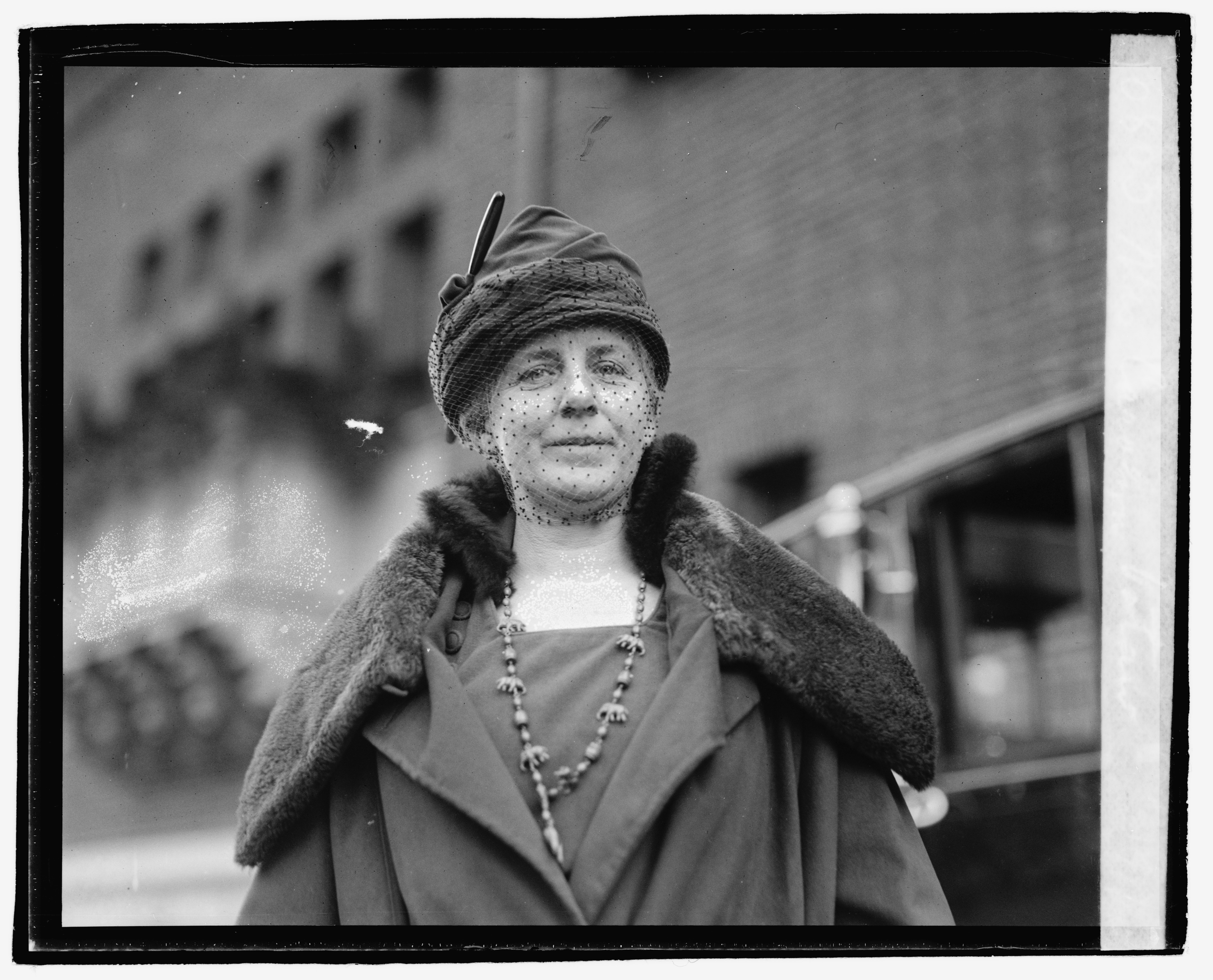
Votaw in 1920

Phoebe Carolyn Harding Votaw (October 21, 1879 – October 22, 1951) the youngest sister of Warren G. Harding, 29th President of the United States, was a missionary, then a public officeholder in Washington D.C. before and during his administration.

She was born in Caledonia, Ohio, in 1879, and graduated from high school in Marion, Ohio, in 1898. To distinguish her from her mother, Phoebe Dickerson Harding, she was known by her middle name Carolyn. From 1905 to 1914, she served as a missionary in Burma with her husband, Heber H. Votaw, a Seventh-day Adventist minister, whom she wed in 1903. They moved to Washington while Harding was a U.S. Senator from Ohio. There, she was an early member of the Women's Bureau of the Metropolitan Police Department of the District of Columbia, serving as a probation officer, and running a program for unwed mothers. During that period, her husband served as a clerk to Senator Harding, then as an assistant clerk for the U.S. Senate Committee on the Philippines, which Harding chaired in 1919 and 1920.

Soon after her brother was elected to the presidency in 1920, she was appointed to head the social service division of the U.S. Public Health Service, while her husband was named by Attorney General Harry M. Daugherty as Superintendent of Prisons and chairman of the boards of parole at each institution. Mrs. Votaw also served as an advisor to the Federal Board of Vocation Education within the Veterans' Bureau, which caused her name to arise during testimony in the successful prosecution of the bureau's director, Charles R. Forbes, on corruption charges. She arranged a tour of the White House for Nan Britton, with whom Harding allegedly had an extensive affair, and their child, Elizabeth Britton.

In 1924, after President Harding died in office, Heber Votaw's integrity was challenged in a U.S. Senate hearing on misconduct within the Daugherty Department of Justice. William J. Burns, then the head of the Bureau of Investigation, alleged that Votaw called him off an investigation of a narcotics smuggling ring at Atlanta Federal Penitentiary, fearing the adverse publicity it would generate. He resigned the following year, citing ill health.

The Votaws lived at 7633 Carroll Avenue in Takoma Park, Maryland.
