= Fort Williams (Virginia) =

- Part of the Civil War defenses of Washington, D.C.
- Alexandria, Virginia
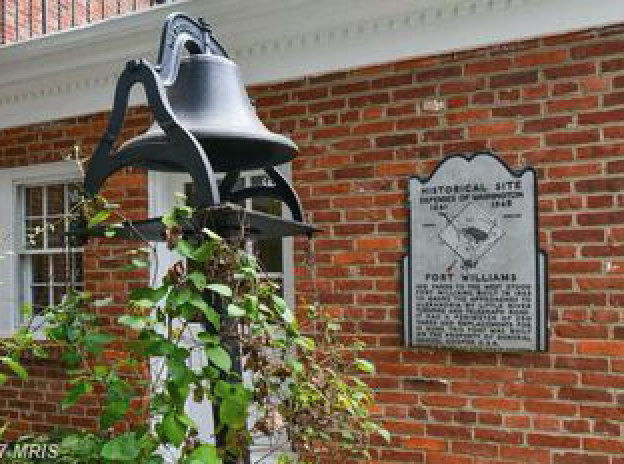
- Fort Williams located in the backyard of 212 Quaker Lane in Alexandria, Virginia

Site information
- Type: Earthwork fort
- Controlled by: Union Army
- Condition: Dismantled

Location
- Coordinates: 38.81180°N 77.09000°W

Site history
- Built: 1861
- Built by: U.S. Army Corps of Engineers
- In use: 1861–1865
- Materials: Earth, timber
- Demolished: 1865
- Battles/wars: American Civil War

Fort Williams was a timber and earthwork fortification constructed in Alexandria, Virginia as part of the defenses of Washington, D.C. during the American Civil War.

== History ==
Fort Williams was named for Thomas Williams who was killed at Baton Rouge on August 5, 1862.

Built in the weeks following the Union defeat at Bull Run, Fort Williams was situated on north of Hunting Creek and Cameron Run, (which feeds into it), near Vaucluse. From its position on Quaker Lane, one of the points west of Alexandria, the fort overlooked the Orange and Alexandria Railroad, the Little River Turnpike, and the western approaches to the city of Alexandria which is the largest settlement in Union-occupied Northern Virginia.

Built by the 2nd Connecticut Heavy Artillery Regiment, Fort Williams had a perimeter of 250 yards, and space for 13 guns.

The Fort is now located in the backyard of a property in the Seminary Ridge neighborhood. Portions are also included in a 7.80 acres (31,600 m^{2}) Alexandria, Virginia city park, at 501 Fort Williams Parkway. A small cemetery with the gravesites of several Union soldiers was located in the woods off the southeast corner of Seminary Road and Fort Williams Parkway. The graves were not well known and were desecrated when homes were built on that plot in the mid-1980s.

Among those stationed at the fort during the war was George Tryon Harding, father of Warren G. Harding, who spent time there in 1864.

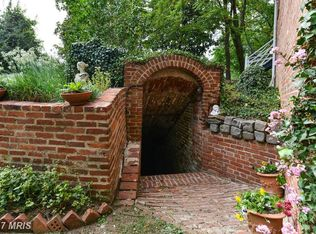

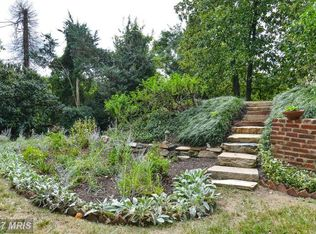

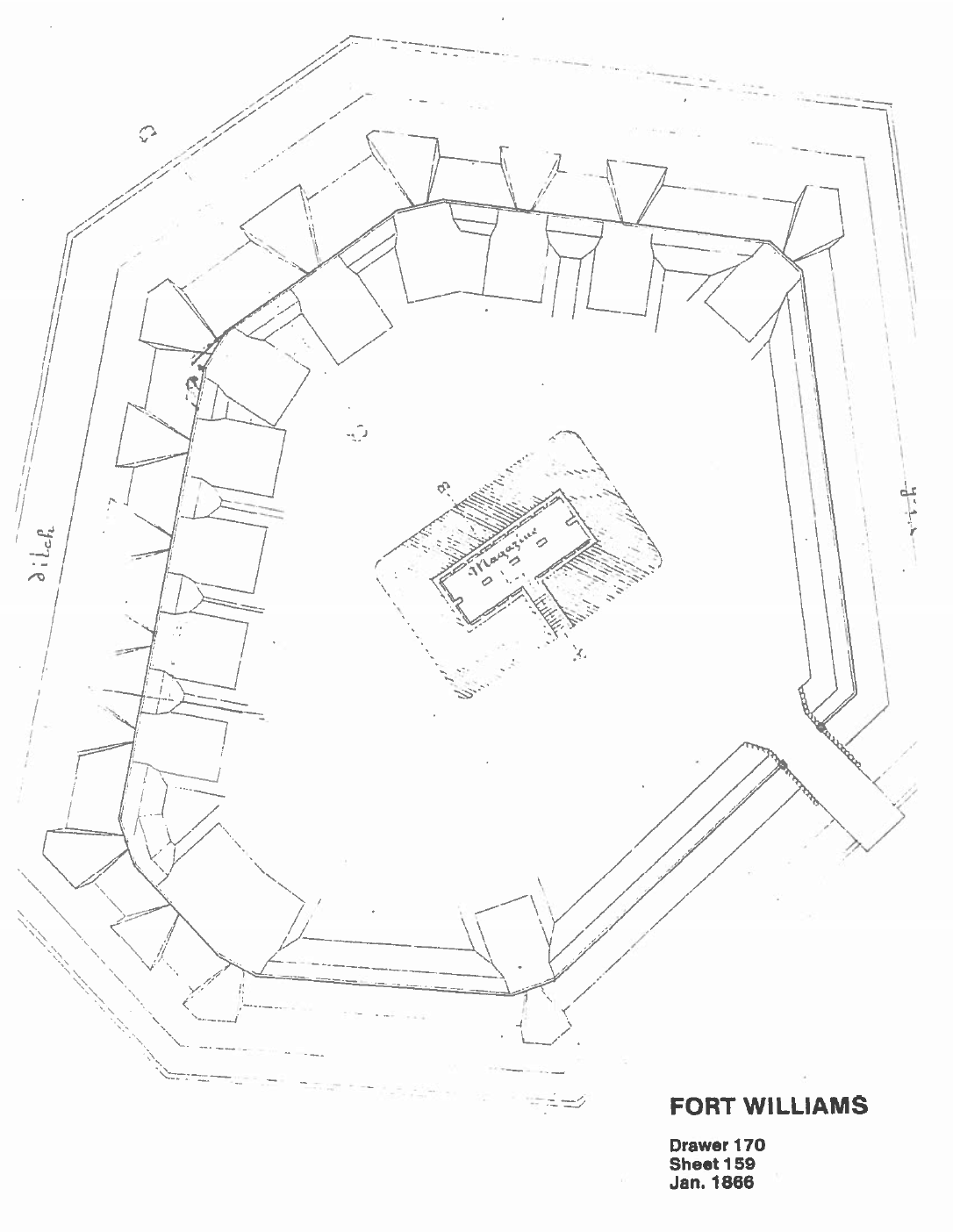

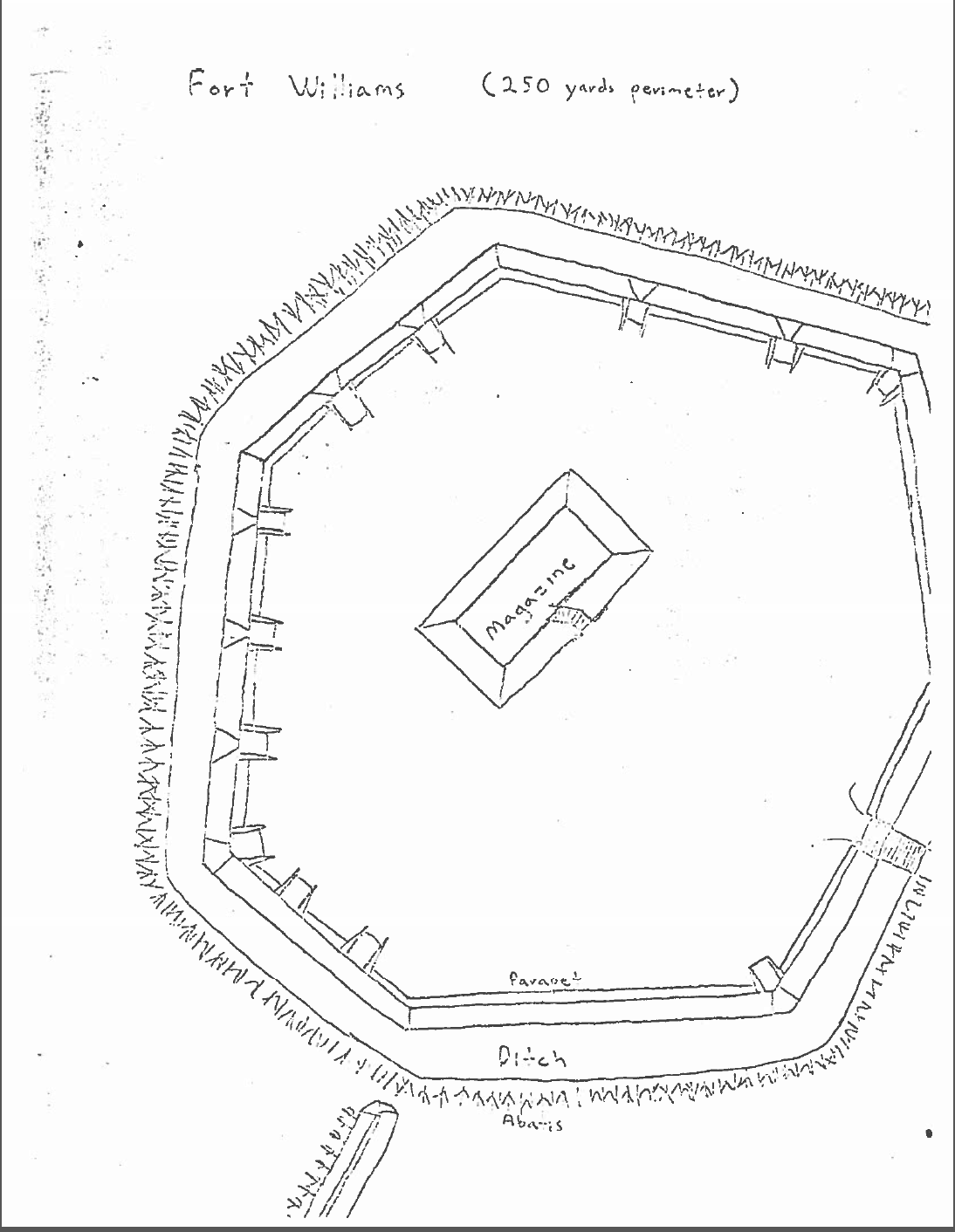

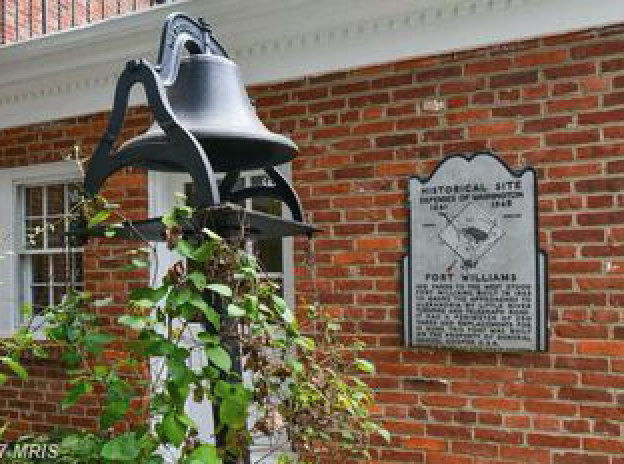
