= John Juliani =

Canadian actor, writer, producer, director and educator (1940–2003)

- Born: March 24, 1940; Montreal, Quebec, Canada
- Died: August 21, 2003 (aged 63); Vancouver, British Columbia, Canada
- Education: National Theatre School of Canada
- Occupations: Actor; Writer; Producer; Director; Educator
- Children: Alessandro Juliani

John Juliani (March 24, 1940, Montreal – August 21, 2003, Vancouver) was a Canadian actor, writer, producer, director and educator. His career spanned four decades in a number of different media, including radio and film. In addition to his artistic contributions, Juliani was a strong advocate of Canadian theatre and the arts. He is the father of actor Alessandro Juliani.

== Career ==
Juliani trained at the National Theatre School of Canada and was the first alumnus of that school to serve there as a guest teacher. Early in his career, Juliani performed at the Stratford Festival of Canada and was a member of the Stratford Shakespearean Festival Company.

In 1966, Juliani joined the theatre department of Simon Fraser University as an instructor. At that time, he also established the Savage God Theatre Company. Juliani took the name from a comment made by William Butler Yeats after Yeats had seen a production of Alfred Jarry's Ubu Roi to signify literary and theatrical revolution.

During 1973 and 1974, under a grant from the Canada Council, Julian traveled and studied world theatre. Afterwards, in 1974, Juliani established the graduate studies program in theatre at York University. In 1976, Juliani moved to Edmonton where he produced work with Savage God in both that city and Toronto. In 1978, he received a Canadian Film Award nomination for Best Actor at the 29th Canadian Film Awards, for his performance as Jean-Baptiste Lagimodière in the film Marie-Anne.

In 1982, Juliani joined radio drama department of the CBC in Vancouver, where he was the executive producer of special projects until 1997.

In 1983, Juliani and Sharon Riis earned a Genie Award nomination for Best Original Screenplay for the film Latitude 55°, which Juliani also directed. That film earned a total of six Genie nominations.

Juliani was an active member of artists’ unions and organizations, including Equity, serving on its West Coast Advisory Committee, and ACTRA. He was the National President of the Directors Guild of Canada for 1986–1987 and later spent a decade as chairman of the B.C. District Council of the DGC. Juliani also served as President of the Union of British Columbia Performers (ACTRA) from 1998 until his death. Juliani was also a founding member of the editorial board of the Canadian Theatre Review.

In Vancouver, under Juliani’s guidance, Savage God undertook a number of projects, including The Shakespeare Project, a programme of staged readings of the entire works of Shakespeare. The project commenced in January 2000, and had been intended to span a number of years. With Juliani’s sudden death after a short battle with liver cancer, Savage God produced the remaining plays in a three-day "Bard-a-Thon" in June 2004, ending with a production of Hamlet.

In addition to founding Savage God, Juliani was a co-founder and co-artistic director of "Opera Breve", a self-styled "micro" company.
