= Guillaume Sayer =

Pierre Guillaume Sayer (October 18, 1799 – August 7, 1868) was a Métis fur trader who challenged the monopoly of the Hudson's Bay Company (HBC) of the fur trade in the Red River region. Ultimately this led to its end.

After leaving the HBC, Sayer moved near the Red River Settlement. He was arrested and tried in 1849 for independent trading. Although he was convicted, the judge levied no fine or punishment. Effectively the HBC could no longer use the courts to enforce its monopoly in the Red River region. It gave up its ownership of Rupert's Land in 1868, and the monopoly was officially ended in 1870.

== Life ==
Sayer was born October 18, 1799, "[t]he natural son of John Sayer of the parish of Sainte Anne," and an Ojibway woman, Marguerite. Records from Pointe-Claire, Quebec, indicate that he was baptized on July 21, 1815.

Sayer enlisted as a coureur des bois with the McTavish, McGillivray & Company on April 7, 1818, as was registered by the notary J.-G. Beek at Ste Anne, Bout de l'Isle, in the west of the Island of Montreal. He was hired to work in the areas controlled by the North West Company. The contract is preserved in the Archives Nationales du Quebec.

According to the Hudson Bay Archives, Pierre Guillaume worked for the North West Company at Cumberland House from 1818 to 1821, the year of the union of the North West and Hudson Bay companies. From 1828 to 1829, he worked for the Hudson Bay Company as a Bowsman at Fort Pelly in the Swan River District and then stayed on as a Steersman from 1829 to 1832. In 1832, he was freed from his service in the Hudson Bay Company and moved to Grantown, near the Red River Settlement.

On March 2, 1835, according to the St. Francois Xavier Catholic Church marriage records, Sayer married Josephte Frobisher, the elder daughter of fur trader Alexander Frobisher and his Cree wife, on March 2, 1835, at St. Francois Xavier. Josephte, who was born around 1795 to 1807, was baptized the same day as the wedding. She and Sayer had eight sons and four daughters together.

== Trial ==
Sayer had been trading to Norman Kittson, now in Pembina, North Dakota, which was in direct violation of the Hudson Bay Company's monopoly. In 1849, Chief Factor John Ballenden arrested Sayer, André Goulet, Hector McGinnis, and Norbert Larond of Grantown as they were about to leave on a trading trip to Lake Manitoba. They were brought to trial before the General Quarterly Court of Assiniboia on May 17, 1849.

Sayer was backed by Métis leader Louis Riel Sr. On the day of the trial, a crowd of armed Métis men gathered outside the courtroom, ready to support their Métis brother. They demanded that Sayer be tried by a jury of his own choosing and to be allowed to take fellow Métis into the court with him.

Although Sayer was allowed to select a jury of his own, he was still found guilty. Judge Adam Thom, under immense pressure from the presence of numerous armed Métis, levied no fine or punishment. The Métis cried, "Le commerce est libre! Le commerce est libre!" ("Free Trade! Free Trade!") The HBC could no longer use the courts to enforce their monopoly on the settlers of Red River.

In 1870 the trade monopoly was finally abolished, and trade in the region was opened to any entrepreneur. The company had earlier relinquished its ownership of Rupert's Land under the Rupert's Land Act 1868 enacted by the Canadian Parliament.

== Later life ==
According to the church records at St. Laurent, Manitoba, Pierre Guillaume died on August 7, 1868, at the age of 75. He was buried at St. Laurent the next day, August 8, 1868. Father Laurent Simonet OMI, who had started the mission and became its first parish priest in 1864, officiated. The witnesses were Baptiste Lavallée and Pierre Chartrand.

== Birth dates ==
Sayer's birth year is documented as variously between 1779 and 1807 in different original sources.

- 1779 appears in the Manitoba census of 1834 and in the update of 1835. However, it seems to be a copyist error as the name above lacks its date, which is given to Pierre instead. The error is corrected in the formal census of 1835.
- 1793 is the date given in the registry of his death and burial at St. Laurent, Manitoba.
- 1796 is given on the census of 1849, the year in which he was tried in court.
- 1801 is from the fact that when he enlisted with the Hudson Bay Company in 1828, he stated that he was 27 years old. That is shown on the Servants List of 1828 and gives him 1801 as the year of his birth.
- 1803 is found on the censuses of 1833 and 1838. Pierre’s grandson, Alexander Henry Sayer, also stated that his grandfather was about 14 years old when he enlisted as a voyager in 1818.
- 1807 is from the censuses in 1835 and 1843.

== Sources ==
- Goulet, George R.D. and Terry Goulet. “Free Trade and the Sayer Trial” in The Métis: Memorable Events and Memorable Personalities. Calgary: FabJob Inc., 2006: 101-108.
- Morton, W.L. (1988). "Sayer, Pierre Guillaume". In Halpenny, Francess G. (ed.). Dictionary of Canadian Biography. Vol. VII (1836–1850) (online ed.). University of Toronto Press.
- Stanley, Della M. M. “Pierre-Guillaume Sayer.” Dictionary of Canadian Biography, Vol. VII (1836-1850). Toronto: University of Toronto Press, 1988: 776-777.
- Stubbs, Roy St. George. “Adam Thom” in Four Recorders of Rupert’s Land. Winnipeg: Peguis Publishers, 1967: 1-47.
- Western Law Times, Vol. 2, 1891: 12-15.
