= Dit name =

Primarily French-Canadian alternate surname

The dit name (French: nom-dit [nɔ̃ di]) is a mostly French-Canadian custom by which families often adopted an alternative surname. They are also used in France, Jersey, Italy, Scotland, and areas of the United States with a French cultural background, such as Louisiana and New Hampshire. The practice of giving such names was common in the seventeenth and eighteenth centuries, and though some people later simplified their surnames, some of them are still used in the twenty-first century. The dit name poses challenges for genealogists confronted with different surnames in different documents, particularly if they are not familiar with the custom.

Dit and the feminine form dite translate as "called" and are the past participle of the French verb dire, "to say". A name such as Adolphe Guillet dit Tourangeau can translate as "Adolphe Guillet, called Tourangeau", where both "Guillet" and "Tourangeau" are used as surnames, sometimes together and sometimes individually in different situations. The dit name carried the same legal weight as the original family name with regard to land transfers and the naming of children. Dit names developed for a variety of reasons, such as distinguishing one family from another nearby family with the same surname, or allowing an adopted child to retain both their birth and adopted family names. In some cases, both the original name and the dit name were retained, resulting in full-blown double-barrelled names such as Miville-Deschênes.

A family's dit name often derived from a personal attribute (Leblond, Leblanc, Leroux), place of origin (St-Onge, Coderre, LeBreton), or profession (Chartier, Meunier, Vanier). For example, an immigrant to New France from Paris might receive the dit name Parisien, and a person who worked as a blacksmith might receive the dit name Lefebvre. Sometimes, the name could be ironic. A large person could be "Tiny" or Petit. The custom originated in the military, where those with the same name adopted noms de guerre to distinguish themselves. Children often adopted the dit name, sometimes dropping the original family name. Sometimes some of the children chose to take only the family name and others only the dit name.
