= Marie-Anne Gaboury =

French-Canadian settler and grandmother of Louis Riel (1780–1875)

- Born: 15 August 1780; Maskinongé, Quebec
- Died: 14 December 1875 (aged 95); St. Boniface, Manitoba
- Occupations: mother, settler

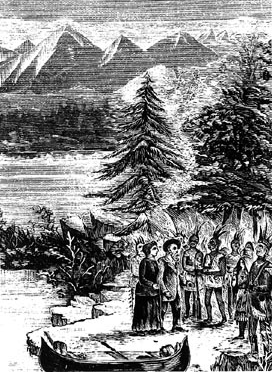
Meeting of Marie-Anne and Jean-Baptiste Lagimodière with First Nations people, c. 1807

Marie-Anne Lagimodière (née Gaboury; 15 August 1780 – 14 December 1875) was a French-Canadian woman noted as both the grandmother of Louis Riel, and as the first woman of European descent to travel to and settle in what is now Western Canada.

== Early life ==
Gaboury was born in Maskinongé, Quebec, a village near modern Trois-Rivières. As a young woman, she kept house for a priest there until her marriage on 21 April 1806 to Jean-Baptiste Lagimodière. Lagimodière was originally from nearby Saint-Ours; he had become a coureur des bois employed in the fur trade by the Hudson's Bay Company in Rupert's Land.

== Travels in the west ==
Immediately following their marriage, and in defiance of the custom of the time, Gaboury travelled to the west with her new husband. They went first to the area near the confluence of the Assiniboine and Red Rivers near what would later become the Red River Colony and eventually modern Winnipeg, Manitoba. They wintered at a Métis encampment near Pembina (under British sovereignty at the time but now in North Dakota), where the first of her eight children was born on 6 January 1807.

The following spring, the Lagimodières travelled to the valley of the Saskatchewan River, in what is now northern Saskatchewan and Alberta, where they remained until 1811, living a semi-nomadic lifestyle among other French-Canadian trappers and their Native wives, Native buffalo hunters, and fur trading forts of the Hudson's Bay and the North West companies, such as Fort Edmonton. During this period, Marie-Anne accompanied her husband on many trapping and buffalo hunting expeditions, and for months she and her children lived in a tent on the open prairies. Her second child was born on the open prairie shortly after her horse bolted towards a herd of buffalo, and on another occasion she fought and shot a large bear that was attacking one of their companions.

Once Tsuu Tʼina warriors took the family prisoner because of their association with Cree. They escaped on horseback but were pursued for five days until reaching the safety of Fort des Prairie (also known as Fort Augustus), the North West Company's counterpart to Fort Edmonton) located near modern Edmonton, Alberta.

Before his marriage, Jean-Baptiste had been involved à la façon du pays (in the style of the country) with a native woman who had borne his children. Marie-Anne was tolerant and accepting of the children arising from this previous relationship, although the other woman was jealous and reportedly threatened to poison her. Despite this incident, the Lagimodières generally had good relationships with the First Nations they encountered. They often regarded Marie-Anne as an object of curiosity during her travels as she was invariably the first white woman they had ever seen. (Some even believed that she possessed supernatural powers).

== Return to the Red River ==
On hearing that Lord Selkirk was establishing a permanent colony at the Red River, they returned to help establish the new Red River Colony in the spring of 1812. The early history of the settlement was characterized by struggles between the Hudson's Bay Company (HBC) and its rival, the North West Company, culminating in the Battle of Seven Oaks in 1816. Although the Lagimodières managed to avoid involvement with the violent confrontations, Jean-Baptiste was asked by HBC representative Colin Robertson to take news of the events to Lord Selkirk in Montreal. Over the winter of 1815–1816, Lagimodière travelled over 2,900 km on horseback and on foot in fulfillment of this mission. During this time, Marie-Anne found shelter among the First Nations and Métis people of the Red River area when the Nor'Westers took possession of Fort Douglas. On his return from the east, Jean-Baptiste was taken prisoner by the Nor'Westers and was imprisoned in Fort William until August 1816. The Lagimodières were not reunited until September 1816, after the unrest subsided.

In recognition of his service, Lord Selkirk awarded Jean-Baptiste a tract of land near the Red River, which the Lagimodières farmed for many years. They had six more children, including, in 1822, Julie Lagimodière, the future mother of Louis Riel. The first years were not easy – grasshoppers, mice and a flood prevented harvests. But Marie-Anne and her children stuck with it while Jean-Baptiste went on hunting journeys. She generously supported Catholic missionaries when they arrived in 1818 as a sign of civilization in the rough land.

Dying at age 95 in 1875, Marie-Anne lived to see Manitoba become a province in the Canadian Confederation, following her grandson Riel's actions during the Red River Rebellion of 1869–1870.

== Legacy ==
She is sometimes remembered as the "Grandmother of the Red River", and many of the Métis people of the Canadian Prairies can trace their ancestry to her.

École Marie-Anne-Gaboury, a French immersion elementary school in St. Vital, Winnipeg, Manitoba, was named in her honour, as is Rue Marie Anne Gaboury in Bonnie Doon, Edmonton, Alberta, which is the home to the French-language section of the University of Alberta, the Campus Saint-Jean.

The 1978 Canadian feature film Marie-Anne tells a fictionalized story of "the first white woman in Western Canada".

== See also ==
- Isobel Gunn, an HBC labourer who travelled to Rupert's Land disguised as a man.
