= Indigenous Canadian personalities =

Individual Indigenous Canadians

Over the course of centuries, many Indigenous Canadians have played a critical role in shaping the history of Canada. From art and music, to law and government, to sports and war; Indigenous customs and culture have had a strong influences on defining Canadian culture. The Indspire Awards are the annual awards presented by Indspire, formerly the National Aboriginal Achievement Foundation. The awards were first established in 1993 in conjunction with the United Nations declaring the 1990s "International Decade of the World's Indigenous peoples". June 21 is Canada's National Aboriginal Day, in recognition of the cultural contributions made by Canada's indigenous population. The day was first celebrated in 1996 following Governor General of Canada Roméo LeBlanc's proclamation.

1,172,790 million people reported having at least some Indigenous ancestry in 2006, representing 3.8% of the total Canadian population. From 1981 to 2001, the percentage of Indigenous people who obtained college diplomas increased from 15.0 per cent to 22.0 per cent, while the percentage that obtained university degrees increased from 4.0 per cent to 6.0 per cent. This compares with increases of 20.0 per cent to 25.0 per cent for non-Indigenous people obtaining college diplomas that is a narrow gap between the Indigenous and non-Indigenous population. This is partly due to organizations that focus attention on the achievements and welfare of Indigenous Canadians like, Congress of Aboriginal Peoples, Native Women's Association of Canada, Aboriginal Curatorial Collective, National Aboriginal Health Organization, Metis Child and Family Services Society and Aboriginal Peoples Television Network.

== Notable individuals ==
=== First Nations ===
First Nation people have come from a diverse background of history, economy, culture, and government. First Nations become active politicians in the Canadian government holding a sense of pride and patriotism towards the nation of Canada. First Nations also become politicians within their own well-defined First Nation government known as the Assembly of First Nations (AFN) which supported by its membership, land base and tribal councils

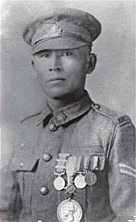
Francis Pegahmagabow, an expert marksman and scout during WWI

Shanawdithit, born 1801, was the last recorded surviving member of the Beothuk people. After Shanawdithit's death in 1829, the Beothuk people became officially extinct as a separate ethnic group. Aatsista-Mahkan (Running Rabbit), became chief of the Siksika First Nation following the death of his father in 1871. Aatsista-Mahkan was a signatory to Treaty 7, but he and his people continued living the plains Indian lifestyle following the bison until 1881. The Siksika Nation was then forced to settle on a reserve 97 kilometres (60 mi) east of today's Calgary, Alberta. Big Bear (mistahi-maskwa) was a Cree leader notable for his participation in the 1870 Battle of the Belly River. Following this, in 1873, Big Bear clashed with the Métis. Francis Pegahmagabow was the First Nation soldier most highly decorated for bravery in Canadian military history and the most effective sniper of World War I. Mary Greyeyes-Reid was the first First Nations woman to join the Canadian Forces. Tommy Prince was one of Canada's most decorated First Nations soldiers, serving in World War II and the Korean War. Mary John, Sr., CM was a leader of the Dakelh (Carrier) people and a social activist. A story of her life is told in the book titled Stoney Creek Woman. Ethel Blondin-Andrew, was a Canadian politician of Dene descent in the Northwest Territories and the first Indigenous woman to be elected to the Parliament of Canada. Ovide Mercredi is a politician of Cree descent and a former national chief of the Assembly of First Nations. Harold Cardinal was a Cree writer, political leader, teacher, negotiator and lawyer who demanded, on behalf of all First Nation peoples, the right to be "the red tile in the Canadian mosaic. The tenth Lieutenant Governor of Alberta, Ralph Steinhauer, was the first Indigenous person to become a Lieutenant Governor in Canada, holding that post between 1974 and 1979. Skowkale lawyer and judge, Steven Point, OBC (Xwĕ lī qwĕl tĕl), was the Lieutenant Governor of British Columbia from 2007 to 2012.

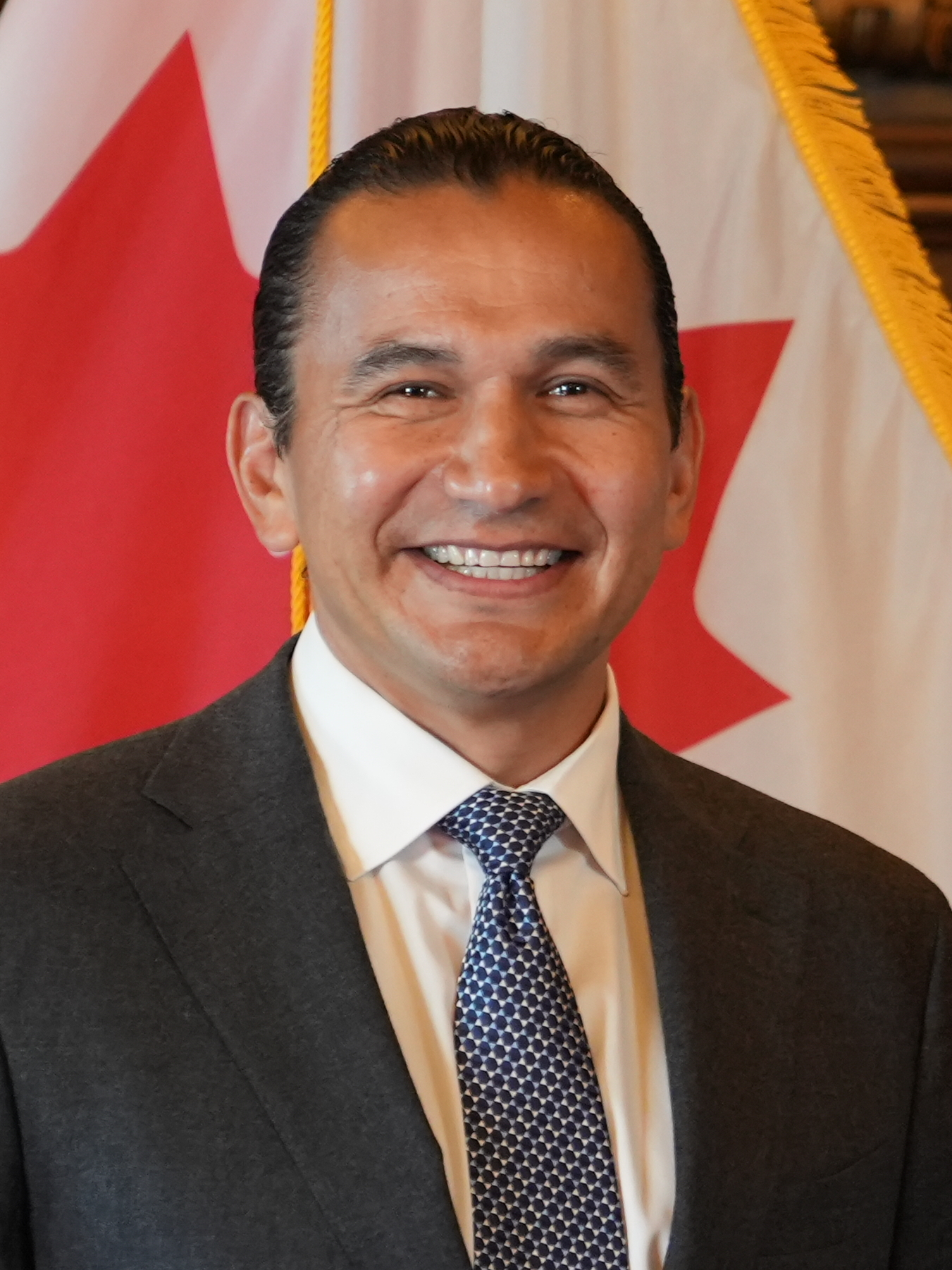
Wab Kinew in 2024

The Premier of Manitoba, Wab Kinew, is Canada's first Indigenous provincial Premier, having been elected to this post in 2023. Harriet Nahanee was a civil rights activist, a Canadian residential school system survivor and environmentalist. Nahanee was arrested and imprisoned in 2007 at the age of 71 for trying to protect Squamish Nation territory. Theresa Spence a chief of the Attawapiskat First Nation is a prominent figure in the modern Attawapiskat housing and infrastructure crisis and Idle No More protest.

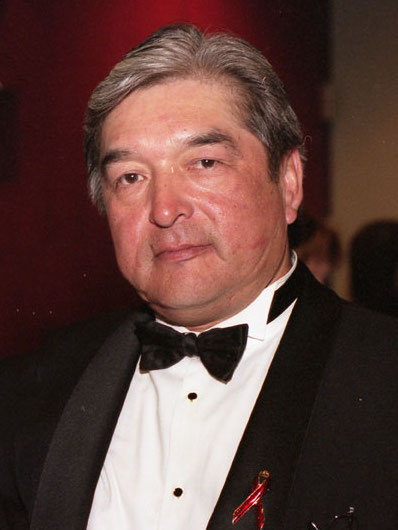
Graham Greene at the Gemini Awards in 1998

The arts and entertainment industry has seen Indigenous peoples stand at the Oscars, an internationally prominent award ceremony such as Chief Dan George. Dan George OC, was chief of the Tsleil-Waututh (Coast Salish) Nation, Academy Award-nominated actor and an author. Adam Beach is an actor of Saulteaux descent from Dog Creek First Nations Reserve at Lake Manitoba. Beach has acted in high-profile roles such as, Marine Private First Class Ira Hayes in Flags of Our Fathers, Private Ben Yahzee in Windtalkers, Chester Lake in Law & Order: Special Victims Unit and starred in Canadian television productions such as Arctic Air. Lorne Cardinal of Cree descent, is noted for playing First Nations roles in many productions. Cardinal's most notable Canadian role was portraying character Davis Quinton on the Canadian television series Corner Gas. Tantoo Cardinal is a Canadian film and television actress of Métis and Cree descent.Graham Greene is an Academy Award–nominated Canadian actor from the Oneida tribe. He was born in Ohsweken on the Six Nations Reserve in Ontario. D'Pharaoh Woon-A-Tai is an Emmy-nominated Canadian Oji-Cree actor known for Reservation Dogs.

Shania Twain is a country pop artist of partial Cree ancestry. Shania Twain along with Alanis Morissette are the only Canadian musicians to have sold over 2 million units in Canada, receiving the double diamond award. Kashtin was a Canadian folk rock duo composed of Innu Claude McKenzie and Florent Vollant. Robbie Robertson, Mohawk, musician, singer–songwriter, and guitarist is best known for his membership in The Band. Norval Morrisseau, CM, or Copper Thunderbird, was an Anishinaabe artist known as the "Picasso of the North". Bill Reid, OBC, was an artist who renewed interest in his heritage Haida art, with his sculpture and totem poles.

In sports there are number of accomplished First Nations peoples, such as Tom Longboat, an Onondaga distance runner. Longboat was inducted into both Canada's Sports Hall of Fame and the Indian Hall of Fame. George "Chief" Armstrong was noted as an Irish-Algonquin, professional hockey player. Ted Nolan, Ojibwe, Jack Adams Award winner, is a retired professional hockey left winger of the National Hockey League (NHL). Nolan was the former head coach and vice president of hockey operations for an American Hockey League (AHL) team. Jonathan Cheechoo was the first member of the Moose Factory Cree Nation to play hockey for the Ottawa Senators of the NHL. Of Cree heritage, Jon Mirasty, "Nasty Mirasty", is a popular enforcer in the AHL.

=== Inuit ===
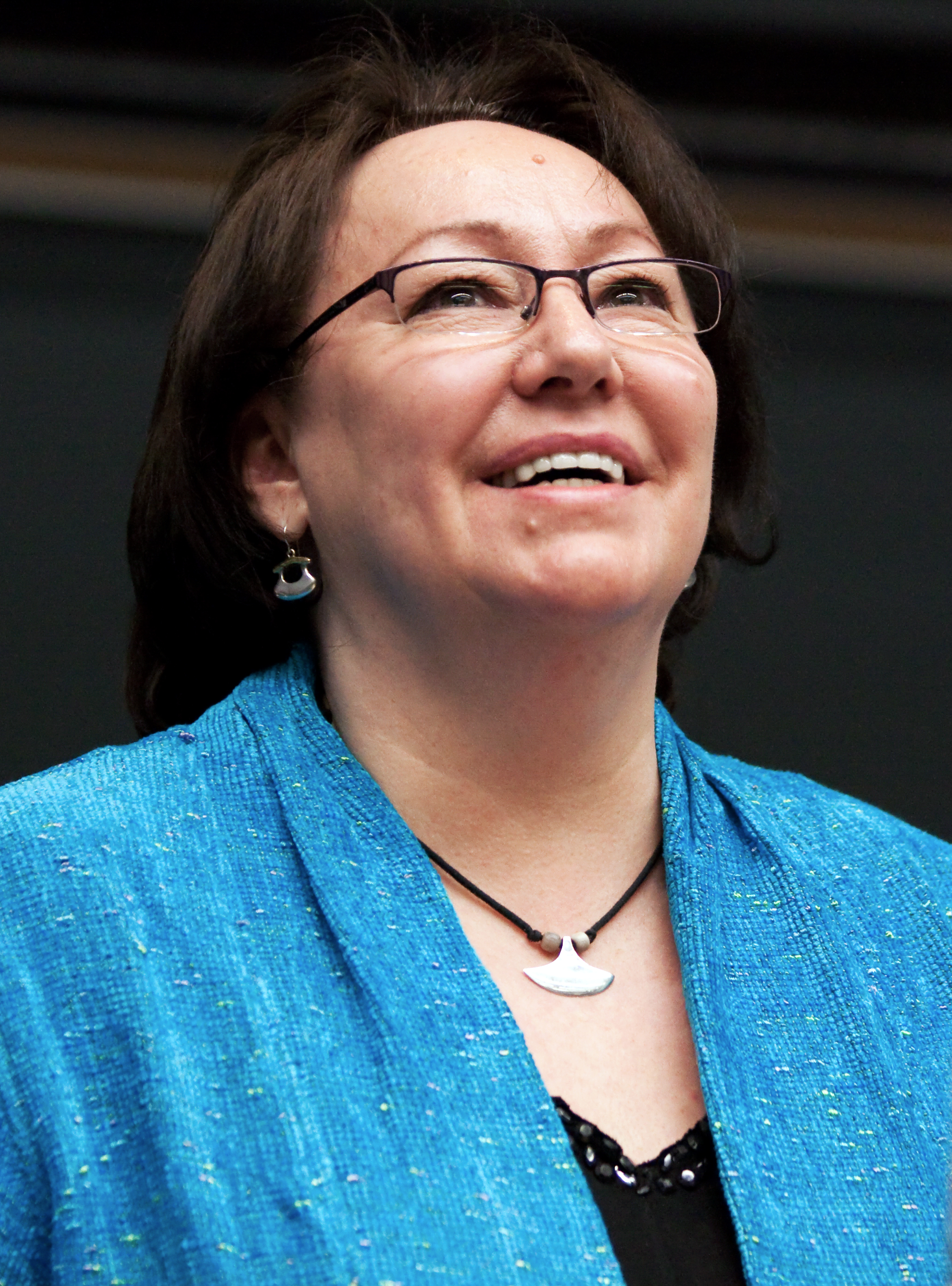
Sheila Watt-Cloutier lecturing at York University's 50-50 Symposium

Inuit serving in political roles have actively advocated in support of the Inuit community. Some Inuit serve within a national political organisation known as the Inuit Tapiriit Kanatami. Abe Okpik CM, was instrumental in helping Inuit obtain surnames rather than disc numbers. Simonie Michael, the first Inuk to be elected to what is now the Legislative Assembly of the Northwest Territories, was among the early Inuit leaders to call for an end to the disc numbers. Kiviaq (David Ward) was the first Inuk to become a lawyer, and is responsible for several important advances in establishing the legal rights of the Inuit. In 2001, Kiviaq won the legal right to use his single-word Inuktitut name. Peter Irniq a former Commissioner of Nunavut set up the offices of "the Official Languages, Access to Information and Conflict of Interest Commissioners". Irniq also has encouraged the use of the Inuit languages and the culture, referred to as Inuit Qaujimajatuqangit or IQ. Sheila Watt-Cloutier, OC, is an Inuk political representative and activist at the regional, national and international levels. Sheila has most recently worked as International Chair of the Inuit Circumpolar Council (formerly the Inuit Circumpolar Conference). Nellie Cournoyea, OC, of Inupiat heritage, served as the first female Premier of the Northwest Territories and the second female leader of an elected legislature in Canada. Helen Maksagak, CM, a Copper Inuk, was the last Commissioner of the undivided NWT and first Commissioner of Nunavut. Paul Okalik was the first Premier of Nunavut whose "dream was to help his people in their dealings with the Canadian justice system." Ann Meekitjuk Hanson is the Commissioner of Nunavut as well as civil servant, broadcaster, journalist, and author.

Historically among the Inuit, Stephen Angulalik was an internationally known Ahiarmiut Inuk from northern Canada. Angulalik was recognized as a Kitikmeot fur trader and trading post operator at Kuugjuaq (Perry River), NWT. According to Royal Canadian Mounted Police Sergeant Henry Larsen by 1941, Angulalik and his third wife had raised 11 children. Ebierbing, also known as "Eskimo Joe", was a guide and explorer. Ebierbing was one of the most widely travelled Inuit in the 1860s and 1870s, he assisted Arctic explorers. Peter Pitseolak was an Inuk photographer, artist and historian. Pitseolak lived most of his life in traditional Inuit camps near Cape Dorset, on the southwest coast of Baffin Island, now in the Canadian territory of Nunavut.

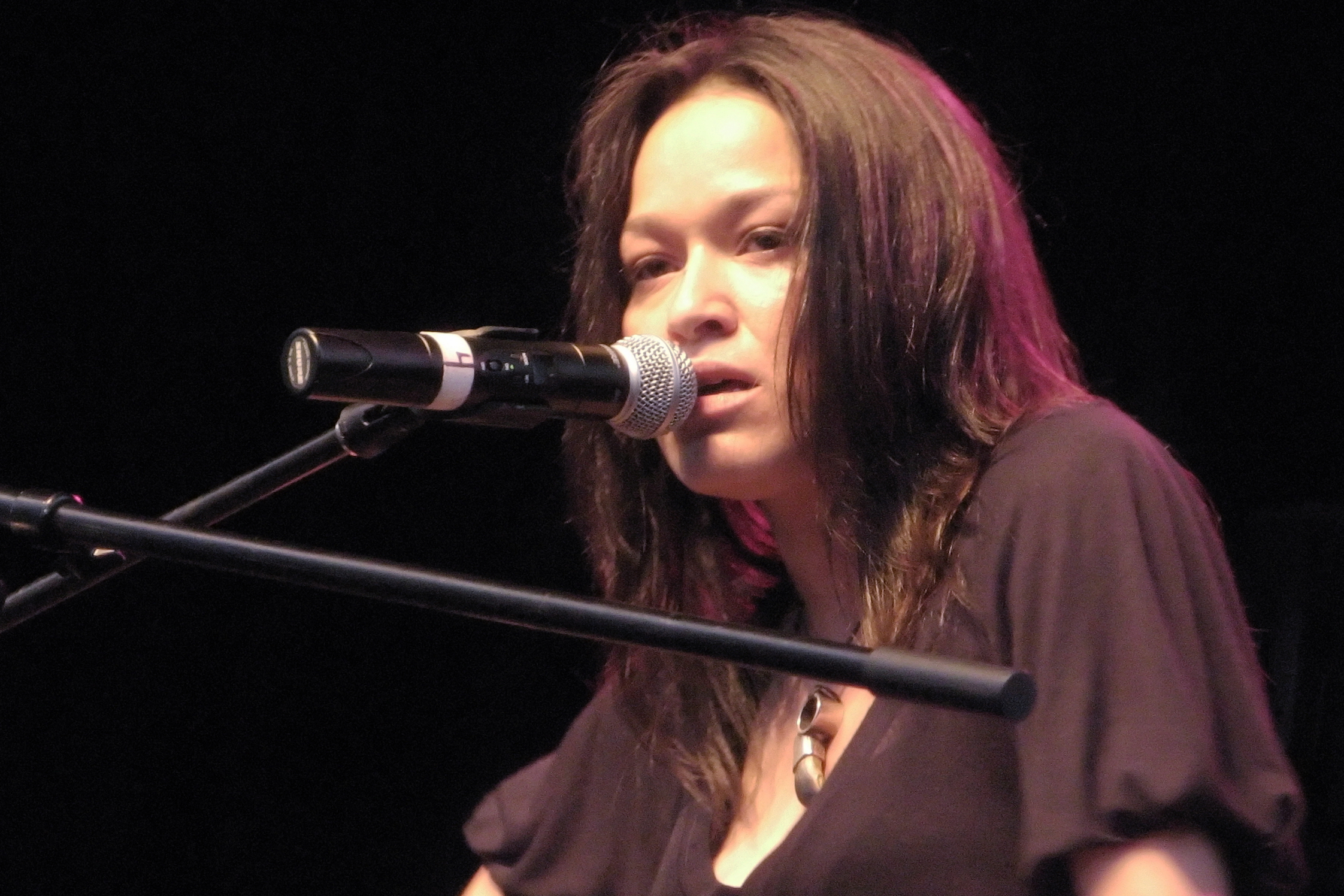
Lucie Idlout at Westfest 2008

Kenojuak Ashevak, CC, is a noteworthy pioneer of modern Inuit art. Born in an igloo in an Inuit camp in 1927, by the late 1950s Kenojuak became one of the first Inuit women in Cape Dorset to begin drawing. She has since created many carvings from soapstone and thousands of drawings, etchings, stone-cuts, and prints – all sought after by museums and collectors. Zacharias Kunuk, is a producer and director distinguished for his film Atanarjuat: The Fast Runner. Atanarjuat was the first Canadian dramatic feature film produced completely in Inuktitut. Atanarjuat is co-founder and president of Igloolik Isuma Productions, Canada's first independent Inuit production company. Annabella Piugattuk is a throat singer, and actress memorable for her role in The Snow Walker. Susan Aglukark is a three-time Juno winning musician, in 1995 for New Artist of the Year and Best Music of Aboriginal Canada. In 2004 Susan won for Aboriginal Recording of the Year, with a blend of folk Inuit music, traditions with country and pop sounds. Tanya Tagaq Gillis is an Inuk throat singer, who performs as a solo artist rather than part of a traditional duo. Charlie Panigoniak is a country singer-songwriter and guitarist whose albums reflect on northern life. Lucie Idlout is a rock singer who writes songs that called attention to the issue of domestic violence in Canada. Jessie Oonark was an internationally renowned artist who was elected a Member of the Royal Canadian Academy of Arts and made an Officer of the Order of Canada. Alootook Ipellie was an illustrator and writer who told the stories of the Inuit in print. Natar Ungalaaq is an actor, filmmaker, and sculptor whose artwork is in many major Inuit art collections worldwide. In sports, Jordin Tootoo is the first Inuk athlete to become a professional ice hockey player playing with the NHL.

=== Métis ===
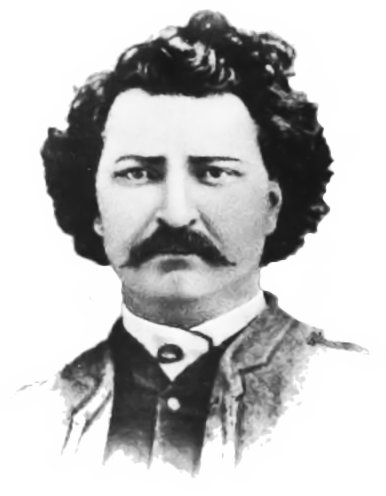
Louis Riel, leader of the Red River Rebellion and North-West Rebellion.

The life and times of celebrated Métis people include military figures, entrepreneurs, and sports professionals. Historically, William Kennedy was an Arctic explorer and, in 1851, commander of the second of four expeditions sponsored by Lady Franklin to find her husband, Sir John Franklin. Gabriel Dumont brought Louis Riel back to Canada, in order to pressure the Canadian authorities to pay attention to the troubles of the Métis people. Louis Riel was a founder of the province of Manitoba, and leader of the Métis people of the Canadian Prairies. He led two rebellions against the Canadian government and its first post-Confederation Prime Minister, Sir John A. Macdonald; the Red River Rebellion of 1869–1870 and the North-West Rebellion of 1885 which ended in his trial. Dumont would serve under Riel as adjutant general in the provisional Métis government declared in Saskatchewan in 1885. Dumont then commanded the Métis forces in the North-West Rebellion. Elzéar Goulet was a Métis leader in the Red River Settlement, supporter of Louis Riel's provisional government and namesake of Winnipeg's Elzéar Goulet Memorial Park. Charles Nolin was a Métis farmer and active political organiser who equivocated between religion and political support of the North-West Rebellion and his first cousin Louis Riel. John Bruce was the first president of the Métis provisional government and fought at the Red River Settlement during the Red River Rebellion of 1869.

The Métis National Council is a national political organisation supported with provincial associations and local communities. Activists for the Métis community include Pearl Calahasen who was the first Métis woman elected to public office in Alberta and Associate Minister of Aboriginal Affairs. Senator Thelma Chalifoux was the first female Métis to receive the National Aboriginal Achievement Award.

Blanche Brillon Macdonald was an entrepreneur and activist who developed the "Blanche Macdonald Centre". Suzanne Rochon-Burnett, CM, O.Ont was a businesswoman and a founder of the Métis Nation of Ontario.

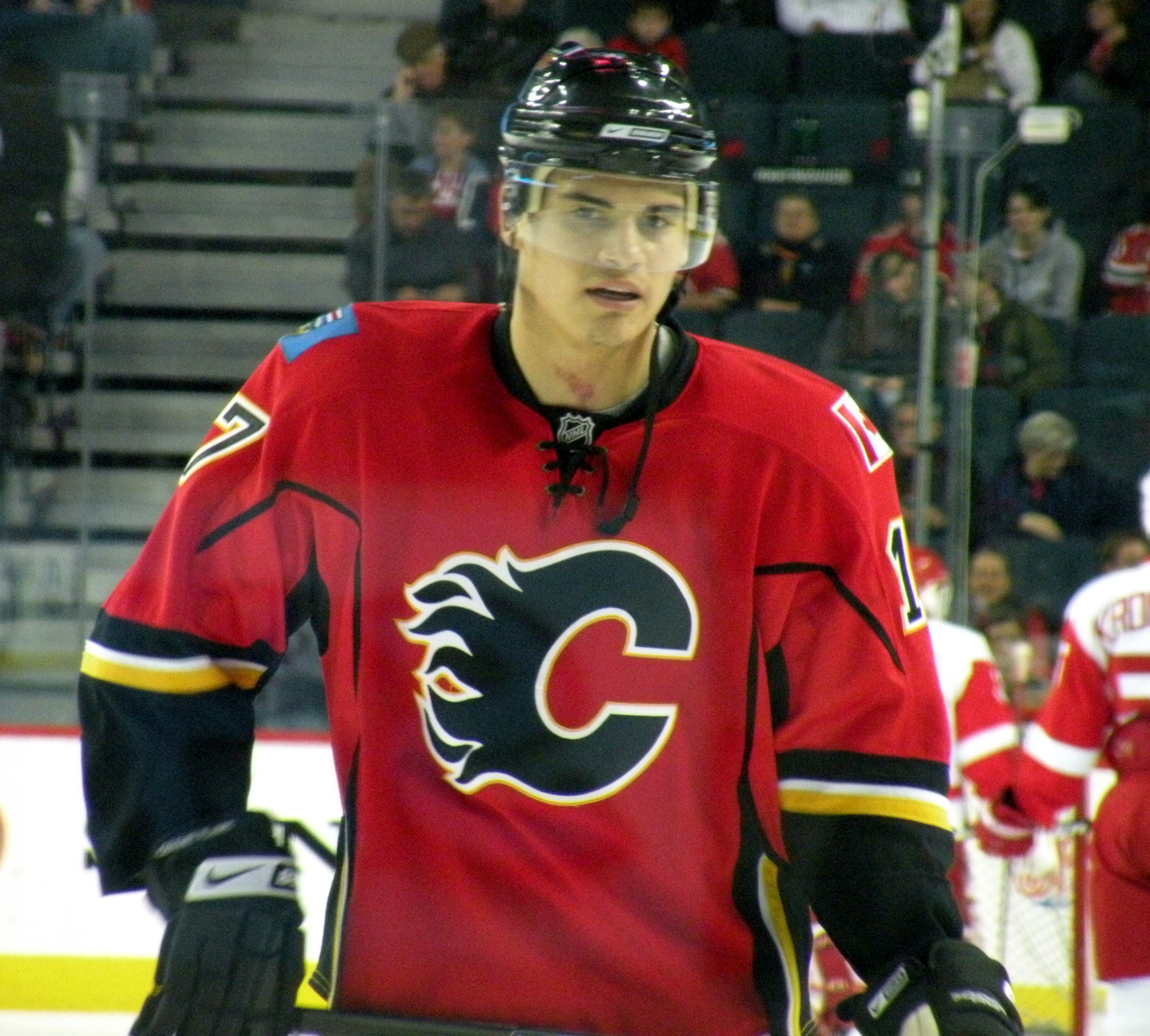
Forward Rene Bourque during a game between the Calgary Flames and Detroit Red Wings

Métis traditional culture is portrayed in arts and entertainment by artists such as Christi Belcourt. Belcourt, a painter, craftsperson, and writer, is preeminently known for her acrylic paintings that depict floral patterns. These patterns are inspired by Métis and First Nations historical beadwork art. Laura de Jonge is a family advocate, corporate social responsibility practitioner, filmmaker, and magazine founder. George R. D. Goulet is a best-selling author whose works include several titles about the Métis. Tom Jackson has starred in TV shows such as North of 60 and Shining Time Station. Jackson has also released several albums of country and folk music. Douglas Cardinal, OC, from Calgary is a renowned architect. Born of Métis and Blackfoot heritage, Cardinal is famous for flowing architecture marked with smooth lines, influenced by his Indigenous heritage as well as European Expressionist architecture.

Well known Métis sports figures include Bryan Trottier, a retired Canadian American professional ice hockey centre Hall of Fame award recipient who played 18 seasons in the NHL. Wade Redden is a professional ice hockey NHL defenceman and an alternate captain. Redden has won two Canadian gold medals in the World Junior Championships and once in the World Cup of Hockey. Rene Bourque is a professional ice hockey player in the NHL and first cousin of North American Native Boxing Champion Wayne Bourque. Wayne Bourque has been the North American Native boxing champion three times.

== See also ==
- Juno Award for Aboriginal Recording of the Year
- List of Indigenous musicians in Canada
- List of indigenous artists of the Americas
- List of place names in Canada of Aboriginal origin
- List of writers from peoples indigenous to the Americas
- Persons of National Historic Significance (Canada)
