= Ambroise-Dydime Lépine =

Métis military leader (1840–1923)

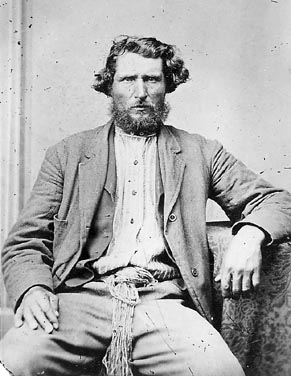
- Born: 18 March 1840; St. Vital, Red River Colony
- Died: 8 June 1923 (aged 83); St. Boniface Hospital, St. Boniface, Manitoba, Canada
- Occupations: Military leader; farmer; politician
- Spouse: Cécile Marion (m. 1859)

Ambroise-Dydime Lépine (18 March 1840 – 8 June 1923) was a Métis politician, farmer, and military leader under the command of Louis Riel during the Red River Rebellion of 1869–1870. He was tried and sentenced to death for his role in the execution of Thomas Scott, but his sentence was commuted to five years exile by the Governor General of Canada.

Ambroise appeared in the Buffalo Bill's Wild West Show at the 1889 Exposition Universelle. He died at St. Boniface Hospital on June 8, 1923, and is buried in the churchyard of the St. Boniface Cathedral next to Louis Riel.

== Early life ==
Ambroise-Dydime Lépine was born in St. Vital in the Red River Colony on 18 March 1840, the fifth of the six children of Jean-Baptiste Berard dit Lépine, an engagé of the Hudson's Bay Company, and Julie Henry. Ambroise-Dydime was educated at the Collège de Saint-Boniface.

Lépine married Cécile Marion in St. Boniface on 12 January 1859 and became a farmer there on river lot 119. Their union produced 14 children.

== Involvement in the Red River Rebellion ==
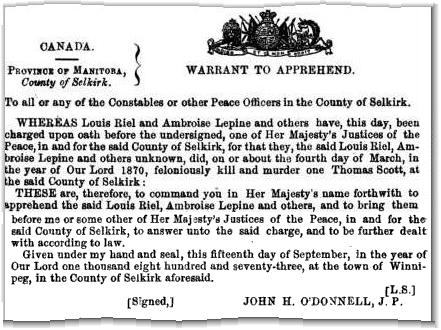
Warrant to apprehend Louis Riel and Lépine

Lépine had had no political history prior to late 1869, when he returned to the Red River Colony from a freight expedition. On 30 October, he learned of plans to transfer Rupert's Land to Canada from the Hudson's Bay Company and that the resident Métis, led by Louis Riel, were seeking to negotiate terms for their annexation. After meeting Riel, Lépine was instructed to go with 14 men to Pembina, Dakota Territory, and prevent Lieutenant Governor–Designate William McDougall from crossing the Canada–United States border. On 7 December 1869, Lépine led 100 Métis to capture John Christian Schultz and his Canadian Party militia at Schultz's home.

On 8 January 1870, the Provisional Government of Manitoba under Riel named Lépine adjutant general of St. Boniface, whose populace elected him to a 40-man convention in the city and to head its military council. The following month, Lépine and his troops captured Charles Arkoll Boulton and his Canadian Party militia after their aborted attempt to take Fort Garry. Among the prisoners taken was Thomas Scott, an Irish Protestant whom the Métis came to loathe. Riel ordered a court martial of Scott, which Lépine presided over. Lépine sentenced Scott to death, and Riel assented, and so Scott was executed by firing squad on 4 March 1870. In March, there was a revolt amongst the Métis against Lépine's conduct that was ended when Riel talked down the rebels and reprimanded Lépine.

When Colonel Garnet Wolseley arrived in the Red River Colony with his forces on 24 August 1870, Riel and Lépine fled to a Catholic mission in the US Dakota Territory. They spent the next year making constant crossings of the border.

== See also ==
- North-West Rebellion
- Red River Colony
- Louis Riel
- Wolseley Expedition
