= English Bay =

English Bay may refer to:

- English Bay (Vancouver), British Columbia, Canada
  - English Bay (neighbourhood)
- English Bay, Alaska, United States
- English Bay, Anticosti Island, Quebec, Canada (Baie-Sainte-Catherine)
- Anse aux Anglais, or English Bay, Rodrigues Island, Mauritius

== See also ==
- English Harbour (disambiguation)
