= List of eponymous roads in Winnipeg =

Partial list of roads in Winnipeg named after people

The following is a partial list of eponymous roads in Winnipeg - that is, roads named after people - with notes on the link between the road and the person.

Road name	Named after	Community	Notes	Year added
Alora Cove	Adam Ostwald and Cornelia (Corry) Ostwald (nee Declercq)	Assiniboia	A portmanteau of Adam, Cornelia, Corry, and Adam. The couple were residents of Harcourt Street and relatives of the street naming applicant. Cornelia was born at Grace Hospital on July 18, 1914, and Adam died in an industrial accident at Pelissier's Brewery Ltd. on Mulvey Avenue on March 21, 1962. Added to the Assiniboia Street Name Reserve List.	2002
Bob Bockstael Drive	Robert "Bob" Bockstael (1924-2017)	Sage Creek	Former councillor for Tache Ward (1973-1979) and Member of Parliament for St. Boniface (1988-1997).	2016
Chief Peguis Trail	Chief Peguis (c. 1774-1864)	Multiple	Named after the Saulteaux chief who signed the Selkirk Treaty of 1817. The trail runs through North Kildonan, East Kildonan, and Elmwood.	
David Northcott Way	David Northcott	North End	Honorary street designation of Winnipeg Avenue from McPhillips Street to Myrtle Street, named after the longtime executive director of Winnipeg Harvest.	2017
Goulet Street	Elzear Goulet (1836-1870)	St. Boniface	Metis leader who was killed by an Orange Order mob for his role in the Red River Rebellion.	
Henderson Highway	Samuel Robert Henderson (1868-1927)	Multiple	President of the Manitoba Good Roads Association from its inception. The highway was renamed in his honour in 1928.	1928
Hespeler Avenue	William Hespeler (1830-1921)	Wolseley	German-Canadian immigration agent and businessman who encouraged Mennonite immigration to Manitoba.	
Johnson Avenue				
Marion Street		St. Boniface		
Milt Stegall Drive	Milt Stegall	Downtown Winnipeg	Named after the Winnipeg Blue Bombers wide receiver who holds the CFL record for career touchdowns.	
William R. Clement Parkway	William R. Clement	St. Vital	Announced in the Winnipeg Free Press on August 24, 2010.	2010

== Street naming process ==
The City of Winnipeg maintains Street Name Reserve Lists for each community committee area. Community members can apply to have names added to these lists by submitting applications to their local community committee. Names are typically chosen to honour individuals who have made significant contributions to the community or have historical connections to the area. The Manitoba Historical Society maintains extensive documentation on the historical origins of Winnipeg street names, building on works such as Mary Hislop's 1912 book The Streets of Winnipeg and Jaroslav Bohdan Rudnyckyj's 1974 Mosaic of Winnipeg Street Names.

== See also ==
- List of eponymous streets in New York City
- List of eponymous roads in London
- Winnipeg
- History of Winnipeg
