= Blanche Brillon Macdonald =

Canadian businesswoman (1931–1985)

- Born: Blanche Mae Violet Brillon; May 31, 1931; Faust, Alberta
- Died: June 8, 1985 (aged 54); North Vancouver
- Occupations: Model; Businesswoman; Activist
- Known for: Blanche Macdonald Centre
- Spouse: Jack Macdonald
- Children: 2

Blanche Brillon Macdonald (11 May 1931 – 8 June 1985) was a Canadian Métis model, businesswoman, and First Nations activist.

She launched her career as the winner of Miss English Bay in 1952 before becoming involved in the support of the rights and culture of Aboriginal peoples as well as numerous women's organizations.

== Biography ==
=== Early life ===
Blanche Violet Mae Brillon was born on May 11, 1931 in Faust, Alberta. She was one of five children born to John Adolphus Brillon and Marie Aloysa Ouellette. Her father was French and her mother was Métis. Brillon's maternal grandmother was a Cree woman whose children experienced the residential school system.

In 1942, Brillon's parents divorced. Marie took her children to Vancouver, then to Bremerton, Washington where she met her second husband, Charles Johnmeyer. The family relocated to Kodiak, Alaska after Johnmeyer was stationed at the naval base there.

=== Modeling ===
When she returned to Vancouver in 1952, she attended the Elizabeth Leslie modeling school. Brillon won Miss English Bay at the annual West End beauty contest. As a result of the victory, she represented the district at the Miss Vancouver Pageant. She continued to model into the mid-1950s.

=== Business ===
By 1956, Brillon had moved to Edmonton and was associate director of the Elizabeth Leslie Modeling School. While in Edmonton, she met Jack MacDonald. They married in 1957 and had two children.

With her husband, she opened the Blanche Macdonald School of Individual Development and Modelling in 1959. The school advertised classes in posture, self-appreciation, and etiquette, among others. In 1964, the company expanded to offer classes in Victoria.

Brillon sold the agency to business partner and Toronto agent Jerry Lodge. She started teaching classes at a local department store in Kodiak after moving there with her two children.

In 1972, the family moved back to Vancouver. Brillon borrowed money to buy back her school for $800. She created programs to help build careers for women who wanted to become self-sufficient. She served on the board for The New Play Centre and the Woman's Network. She changed her school's name to Blanche Macdonald Institute and had 15 full-time employees and 40 part-time instructors.

=== Activism ===
In the 1960s, Brillon become more involved in the Aboriginal community in Vancouver. One year after the Friendship Centre opened (called the Vancouver Indian Centre at the time), she was sitting on the board. She also worked with First Nations designers and promoted Indigenous models. Brillon ran self-appreciation classes in prisons (for men and women) at Oakalla, Matsqui and Maples Women's Prison. She was working for the United Native Nations for which she organized the first ever United Native Nations Conference, the Friendship Centre, and was a founding member of the Professional Native Women's Association.

Brillon lived with her children on the Musqueam Indian Reserve in the 1980s. She also taught classes to Musqueam youth. In 1980, Blanche was adopted into the James Sewid Family at an Alert Bay Potlatch Ceremony.

In 1985, she won the YWCA Women of Distinction Award for Business and the Professions. Brillon initiated a journalism program for Native students, as well as a newspaper catering to First Nations communities across British Columbia. For her work, she was honored with a Women of Distinction Award from the YWCA for business and entrepreneurship, as well as for her role as the chief executive officer of the Native Communications Society of B.C. She was a board member for the Better Business Bureau (BBB), the Modelling Association of America, the New Play Centre, and the Lakeside Advisory Board for Women.

Brillon initiated a journalism program for Native students as well as a newspaper catering towards First Nation communities across British Columbia. For her work, she was honored with a Women of Distinction Award from the YWCA for business and entrepreneurship as well as for her role as the CEO of the Native Communications Society of B.C. She was a board member for the Better Business Bureau (BBB), the Modelling Association of America, the New Play Centre, and the Lakeside Advisory Board for Women.

=== Death and legacy ===
Brillon died in June 1985.

In 1988, the Blanche Macdonald Institute was sold to Lillian Lim, who had graduated from the school's fashion merchandising program in 1982 and had then worked there as a managing director. It was renamed the Blanche Macdonald Centre. Today, Blanche Macdonald Centre is a private college that trains students for careers in makeup, fashion, hairstyling, aesthetics/spa and nails. The college has three campuses – the original campus inside City Square Shopping Centre, and two others, both on Robson Street in Vancouver.

A Woman of Grace, a documentary about Brillon's life, was released in 1998 after a decade of development. Directed by Fiona Jackson, the film highlights her modeling and business careers, activism, and the challenges she faced as a mixed-race Indigenous woman in the predominantly white fashion industry.

== See also ==
- Notable Aboriginal people of Canada
