= Elzéar Goulet =

Métis leader in Canada (1836–1870)

Elzéar Goulet (November 18, 1836 – September 13, 1870) was a Métis leader in the Red River Colony, which later became the province of Manitoba, Canada. He was a supporter of Louis Riel's provisional government and was murdered by Canadian troops under the command of Col. Garnet Wolseley, after the suppression of the Red River Resistance.

Goulet was a member of the Goulet family who have been well documented in their fur trade. Two of Goulet's brothers were also involved in Manitoba's early political history: Maxime Goulet was a member of the Legislative Assembly of Manitoba from 1878 to 1886 and Roger Goulet held posts in the government. Elzear's other brother, Leonide Goulet, was a member of the 49th Rangers, "the armed Metis scouts who accompanied the British-American Boundary Commission" (1873–1874).

== Pre-Resistance life ==
Goulet was born in St. Boniface in the Red River Colony. Goulet was the third son of six to Alexis Goulet and Josephte Siveright. Little has been documented on the early childhood or youth of Elzéar Goulet, but it is assumed that he accompanied his father on his hunts as he was a buffalo hunter. Goulet also received some education in St. Boniface. By the age of 25, Goulet had taken over the mail route that ran from Pembina to Upper Fort Garry. The weekly three- to four-day trips made him well known and respected among the two communities. During these trips, Goulet befriended Joseph Rolette, a very influential person in Pembina who was a postmaster, merchant, freighter, politician, and built a fur-trading post for the American Fur Company in 1840.

It was through this friendship that Goulet met Rolette's niece, Hélène Jérôme, whom he would marry on March 8, 1859, in Assumption Church, at Pembina, Dakota Territory. It was at this time that Goulet became an American citizen. Jérôme was an orphan who was brought up in the care of her uncle, Joseph Rolette, a local merchant and politician. He worked as a mail carrier from Pembina to the Red River from 1860 to 1869 and became an American citizen. Elzéar and Hélène had six children together.

=== Family ===
Goulet got his determination for Métis rights from his father, Alexis Goulet, who was also known for standing up for Métis rights. Alexis helped to assembly 24 buffalo hunters, along with freighters and traders, on 29 August 1845, to write letters demanding the rights of Métis. The 22 men helped James Sinclair, a Hudson's Bay trader and explorer, to write a letter to the Governor Alexander Christie of Red River. The aim of the letter was to demand that the Métis deserve the rights to hunt furs in the Hudson Bay Company territories, while also having the right to sell those furs to the highest bidder without being reprehended.

The Goulet family name was given status and notoriety from Elzéar's older brother, Roger Goulet (1834, St. Boniface – March 25, 1902), who held the position of surveyor, district judge, and member of the Council of Assiniboia, and had connections to the church and government. The Ottawa government gave the title of The Honourable Roger Goulet, which allowed him to negotiate with Riel and Métis leaders about the land claims that were being disputed at the time of the barricade at La Barrière. It was because of the social standing of Roger that persuaded Riel to promote Elzéar to the military rank of captain in Riel's provisional government, where he served under the control of Ambroise-Dydime Lépine.

Eight years after the death of Elzéar, his younger brother Maxime Goulet (1855 – 1932) went onto be elected to represent St. Vital in the Manitoba Legislature, as well as entering John Norquay's cabinet as Minister of Agriculture.

== Role in resistance ==
Goulet joined Louis Riel's forces at Upper Fort Garry in 1869, where he became second-in-command of the Métis militia under Ambroise-Dydime Lépine. In the fall of 1869, Goulet alongside Riel and other Métis, constructed a barricade at the La Salle River bridge, named "La Barrière." The barricade blocked the north-south route from Upper Fort Garry to Pembina. This prevented Canadian government officials from being able to access the land that already belong to the Métis. (The place where La Barrière was built can still be visited, as it is now a park outside of Winnipeg.) While this was taking place, Roger Goulet was authorized to negotiate with Riel and the Métis on behalf of the Canadian Government.

On 3 March 1870, he served on the tribunal that passed judgement on Thomas Scott, an Orangeman from Upper Canada who was accused of treason, as he was a supporter of the Canadian government's claiming of Métis land. Scott also protested violently against the Métis and was accused of voicing racial and anti-Catholic opinions. Goulet voted with the majority to impose a death sentence, and on March 4, 1870, Elzéar escorted Scott to the firing squad along with other members of the court, where Scott was then executed. Following the execution, Elzéar Goulet and Elzéar Lagimodière, were asked to rid of Scott's body. No record has been found on where Scott's body was placed; it is believed that the body was dressed in Métis clothing then placed on a sled that was then disposed of in the Red River.

The execution outraged many in Ontario and contributed to the collapse of Riel's government later in the year, when a military expedition under Garnet Joseph Wolseley entered the settlement.

== Life after resistance ==
Goulet stayed in Red River after the fall of Riel's government. He was recognized in Winnipeg on 13 September 1870, after walking into Bob and Hugh O'Llone's saloon, two American brothers, who owned the Red Saloon. The Red Saloon was a popular spot for those that had been members of the provisional government, the O'Lone's had been members themselves. However, after Col. Garnet Wolseley's military expedition arrived at Upper Fort Garry, situated only meters away, the saloon soon became a popular spot for Wolseley's men.

The man that recognized Elzéar was John Farquharson, who had at one point been held prisoner by the provisional government. Goulet escaped on foot, and tried to swim to St. Boniface across the Red River, all the while being pursued by three men, two of whom were uniformed members of the Wolseley expedition. His pursuers threw rocks at him, one of which struck him in the head and brought about his death by drowning. The time of Goulet's death came within months of the Wolseley expedition at Red River, in which military forces, under the command of Garnet Wolseley, were sent to Manitoba after the Hudson's Bay Company transferred its land to the Canadian government in 1870. The drowning also took place 11 days after Sir Adams George Archibald, Manitoba's first lieutenant governor, arrived. Due to the absence of coroner Curtis James Bird, Archibald appointed to Hudson's Bay Company magistrates, Salomon Hamelin and Robert McBeath, to inquire into the death with the help from newly arrived lawyer, Jean McConville. During the inquiry, 20 witnesses were heard from, one being a follower of Christian Schultz, who identified one of Wolseley's soldiers as an attacker. Warrants for the arrest of the identified soldier, along with another soldier, were issued but no arrests were made. It is believed that the authorities were unwilling to prosecute for fear of causing a large-scale uprising.

The expedition was put into play as a revenge plan to avenge the execution of Thomas Scott by Louis Riel's provisional government. However, when Wolseley's militiamen arrived at Fort Garry on 24 August 1870, the fort was empty as Riel had already fled. The British returned to Ontario but left militia to occupy the fort, increasing the harassment on the Métis and ultimately intensifying the feelings and assaults between the Métis and militia. It was at this time that two others, a Métis and Irish-American, were killed in an act of revenge for the killing of Thomas Scott. Many Métis believed this response effectively sanctioned violence against their community. His 17-year-old daughter Laurette Goulet was also subject to violence, having been raped by Red River Expeditionary Force (RREF) members, later dying from injuries she sustained in the attack. These deaths were also never prosecuted, again, for fear of uprising.

== Legacy ==
In 2007, Winnipeg City Councillor Dan Vandal led a drive for Winnipeg to establish an Elzéar Goulet Memorial Park near the spot where Goulet was killed. The park was officially opened on 13 September 2008. Author George R. D. Goulet, great-grandnephew of Elzéar, was at the ceremony and described his ancestor as a Métis martyr. His great-grandson Dan McDonald was president of the Mid-Island Métis Nation on Vancouver Island and a member of the Métis Nation of B.C. General Assembly.

The Manitoba Métis Federation has a local called Le Conseil Elzear-Goulet.

== See also ==
- Notable Aboriginal people of Canada
- Metis National Council
- Louis Riel
- Red River Colony
