= Thomas Scott Memorial Orange Hall =

Building in Winnipeg

Coordinates: 49°54′06.1″N 97°08′24.75″W

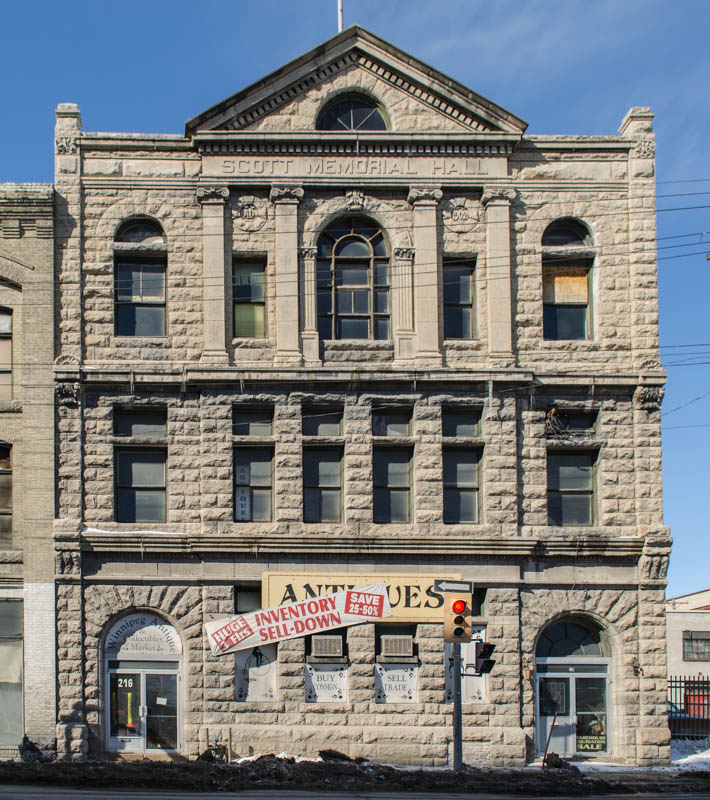

General information
- Status: Demolished
- Location: 216-218 Princess St, Winnipeg, Manitoba, Canada
- Named for: Thomas Scott
- Completed: 1902
- Renovated: 1943
- Demolished: February 2020
- Cost: $21,000
- Renovation cost: $19,584.22
- Client: Loyal Orange Lodge

Design and construction
- Architect: James McDiarmid
- Main contractor: James Henry Neil

Thomas Scott Memorial Orange Hall was a building in the Exchange District of Winnipeg, Manitoba.

Designed by local architect James McDiarmid, the building was 50 feet (15 m) by 90 feet (27 m), and originally featured a full basement, mezzanine, third floor dance hall and lodge meeting rooms on the second floor. It was named for Thomas Scott, who was executed by Louis Riel during the Red River Rebellion.

The building was demolished in February 2020.

== History ==
The Orange Order arrived in Manitoba in 1870 and had expanded such that a large hall was needed. Planning for the construction of such building began in 1871. It was eventually built in 1902 for $21,000, and was named for Orangeman Thomas Scott, who was executed by Louis Riel during the Red River Rebellion.

In 1943, a fire destroyed the original interior. Repairs and alterations totalled $19,584.22 and were completed in September 1943. After the fire, the dance hall was relocated to the first floor, while rest and cloakrooms were built in the basement. The third floor saw the addition of a two-room caretaker's suite.

Beginning in the 1980s, the building was also occupied by the Winnipeg Irish Association, and the hall was eventually sold in 1994. In 2017, it became a municipally-designated historic building.

=== Demolition ===
In January 2020, the building became unstable due to renovations, and the decision was taken to demolish it. This spurred debate in the city of Winnipeg about the role of the municipal government and developers in preserving built heritage, and (given the controversy over the memorialization of Thomas Scott), what elements of heritage should be preserved. The building was demolished in February that year.
