= Wayne Bourque =

Canadian boxer

Personal information
- Nickname: Flurry from Fort MacMurray
- Born: 1959 (age 66–67)
- Website: https://centrering.com/

Boxing career

Boxing record
- Total fights: 130
- Wins: ca. 109
- Losses: ca. 21

Wayne Bourque (born 1959) is a Canadian boxer known as the "flurry from Fort McMurray". He has been the North American Native boxing champion three times in the welterweight and middleweight classes.

== Boxing ==
He was born in 1959 in Lac La Biche, Alberta to Métis parents and has four siblings. He was raised and trained in Fort McMurray. To protect himself from racist attacks, he learned to box.

He won his first tournament, the Northwest Pacific Gold Gloves, at the age of 13 in Seattle. His boxing career totaled 130 fights with approximately 109 wins and 21 defeats. Bourque retired from amateur boxing in 1985 after receiving a knee injury while skiing eighteen days before the Olympic trials.

After retirement, Bourque moved to Toronto in 1987 for a fresh start away from partying and drinking beer. Starting off selling cellphones and plumbing, he learned of the 'boxercise' trend and his wife, Carol, encouraged him to seize the moment.

In 1994, he became a fitness trainer and is the owner of the boxercise centre Centre Ring. His clients have included many NHL players like Matt Stajan - Calgary Flames, Olympian Marnie McBean and players of St.Michael's Buzzers.He leads a summer camp in Toronto, Ontario, Canada where participants use boxing exercises to get fit without the physical contact of boxing matches.

Wayne even appeared as the corner man in the first fight scene with Russell Crowe, in the movie Cinderella Man (2005). He also trained Crowe for the movie.

In 2009, after several years of declining an invitation, he decided to participate in the Ringside World Championships.

TVO profiled Bourque in their Never Stop Learning series and in celebration of Canada's sesquicentennial, Indigo published a book called The World Needs More Canada. Bourque was selected and featured in the book, as one of the "cultural makers of our land, who inspire us, challenge us and reflect who we are for all the world to see."

== Achievements ==
- 1973, Junior National Champion, 80 lb class
- 1974, Junior National Champion, 85 lb class
- 1975, Junior National Champion, 90 lb class
- 1983, bronze medal at the national championships
- 1984, contender to represent Canada at the Olympics
- 2009, Ringside World Champion for Masters (age 40 to 50)
- Lifetime achievement award at the Regional Aboriginal Recognition Awards
- 2012, Wood Buffalo Hall of Fame inductee
- 3x North American Native champion
- 4x provincial champion
- 4x Golden Glove champion

== Family ==
Bourque is married to a woman named Carole and has a son named Brandon who is a talented lacrosse player.

His mother Clara Bourque is featured in Mark of the MetisL Traditional Knowledge and Stories of the Metis People in Northeastern Alberta (2009).

Bourque's second cousin, Rene Bourque played professional hockey in the NHL. His playing career included time with the Chicago Blackhawks, Calgary Flames, Montreal Canadiens, Anaheim Ducks, Columbus Blue Jackets and Colorado Avalanche. Today, Rene Bourque is playing hockey in Sweden.

== See also ==
- Indigenous Canadian personalities
