= Thomas Scott (Orangeman) =

Irish-Canadian labourer & politician (1842–1870)

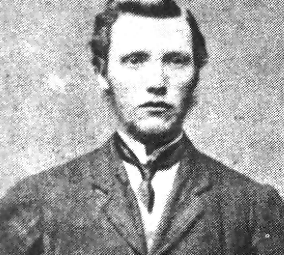
- Born: 1 January 1842; Clandeboye, County Down, Ireland
- Died: 4 March 1870 (aged 28); Upper Fort Garry, Red River Colony, Rupert's Land
- Cause of death: Execution by firing squad
- Occupations: Surveyor for Dawson Road Project, Soldier in the Hasting's Battalion of Rifles

Thomas Scott (1 January 1842 – 4 March 1870) was an Irish Protestant who emigrated to Canada in 1863. While working as a labourer on the "Dawson Road Project", he moved on to Winnipeg where he met John Christian Schultz and fell under the influence of the Canadian Party. His political involvement in the Red River Settlement from then on led to his capture at Fort Garry where he was held hostage with others. On 4 March 1870 Scott was marched out of Fort Garry's east gate and was executed on the wall by the provisional government of the Red River Settlement led by Louis Riel.

Scott's execution led to the Wolseley Expedition – a military force said to be sent to protect Canada from American annexation, but widely believed to confront Riel and the Métis at the Red River Settlement, authorized by Prime Minister John A. Macdonald. Scott's execution highlights a time of severe conflict between settlers and the Métis in Canadian history. His execution led to the exile of Riel and to Riel's own execution for treason in 1885.

== Life ==
Little is known of Scott's early years. He was born in the Clandeboye area of County Down, in what is today Northern Ireland in 1842. Raised as a Presbyterian, he became an active Orangeman. Scott emigrated to Ontario in 1863. On his arrival at Red River, he worked as a labourer on the "Dawson Road" project, connecting the Red River and Lake Superior. He took part in a strike in 1869, for which he was fired and convicted of aggravated assault. Scott then moved to Winnipeg, where he met John Christian Schultz and became a supporter of the Canadian Party. Scott backed the annexation of the Red River Settlement to Canada, and the rest of his life revolved around this conflict.

== Role in the Red River Rebellion ==
During the Red River Rebellion, Scott was first arrested and imprisoned in December 1869 at Upper Fort Garry by Louis Riel and his men along with the party of 45 who had fortified themselves in Schultz's store and warehouse in a challenge to the authority of The National Committee of the Metis of the Red River led by Louis Riel. Thomas Scott escaped Upper Fort Garry in January 1870, as did John Christian Schultz and Charles Mair. In February, Scott alongside several hundred armed volunteers amassed at Kildonan Presbyterian Church and school planning to attack Upper Fort Garry to release the prisoners still being held there. Summarily, Riel released the prisoners, and the rescue party was dispersed. Scott and several volunteers marched to Portage la Prairie but passed too close to Fort Garry, where Scott was captured and imprisoned by Riel's garrison once again. Mair and Schultz travelled through the United States to Ontario to urge the government for an extensive military expedition to the Red River Settlement.

Scott suffered severe diarrhea during his second incarceration, which had a negative effect on both Scott and his captors. During his captivity, Scott was extraordinarily difficult, opinionated, and verbally abusive and refused to acknowledge his captors' legal authority. Thomas had an altercation with a group of guards that injured him so severely that Riel had him locked into another cell with a stronger lock, partly for his own safety. Scott's fellow prisoners had asked that he be removed due to his obnoxious behaviour while in captivity. He was eventually tried and executed for committing insubordination.

== Trial and execution ==
While in jail, Scott became a nuisance as he caused trouble with the guards and made attempts at escaping. He was then brought in front of a court where they found him guilty of defying the authority of the Provisional Government, fighting with guards, and slandering the name of Louis Riel. One of the issues in determining the character of Thomas Scott is a lack of unbiased evidence. An example would be his trial which was held in-camera by a small number of Métis and without any outside observers. An eye-witness to this trial, Nolin, testified later that Scott was not present for the accusations of the charges against him nor for any evidence to support these accusations. These accusations plus their evidence (coming partially from Louis Riel) were later summarised in English by Riel and presented to Scott. Louis Riel himself described the behaviour of Scott that led to his execution not once but multiple times over many years. However, the charges against Scott that were put forth by his contemporaries in 1870 were not the same as those allegations levelled against Scott that in later years by Riel and then by others. In other words, as the years progressed, the accusations became more and more detailed and Scott became a more villainous character. Some of these elaborations entered the oral tradition of the Metis.

Scott was not alone in being sentenced to death, but the other sentences were never carried out. On 4 March 1870, unlike the other members of his group, he faced the firing squad. His execution was watched by 100 bystanders. Many eyewitnesses disagree on multiple aspects of Scott's execution from disagreement on his last words and actions to the manner of his death. What is agreed upon is that he was shot while blindfolded by a firing squad against the east side gate of Upper Fort Garry. It was reported that Scott was kneeling in the snow praying fervently up until he was shot. Other witnesses reported that he had been yelling wildly that his execution was unjust and that his execution was murder. The weapons that were used by the firing squad were ordinary hunting weapons (supposedly muskets) and it was observed that the men who shot these guns were intoxicated. At the time of fire, the men in the firing squad stood 60 metres away from Scott. It was also debated whether or not Scott died immediately when shot by the firing squad.

Métis leader John Bruce claimed that only two bullets from the firing squad actually hit Scott, wounding him once in the left shoulder, and once in the upper chest. A man came forward and discharged his pistol close to Scott's head, but the bullet only penetrated the upper part of the left cheek and came out somewhere near the cartilage of the nose. Still not dead, Scott was placed in a makeshift coffin, from which he was later reported to cry:

"For God's sake take me out of here or kill me."

John Bruce said that he was left there to die of his injuries.

A similar account was reported by Reverend George Young, who was told by Major George Robinson that Scott was confined to a roughly made coffin on the presumption that he had died when shot on by the firing squad. Robinson said that five hours later he and Riel entered the room where Scott's coffin was being kept and heard Scott beg for death. Robinson fled the room, Riel closed the door and, a few moments later, Robinson heard a shot and presumed that Scott was then dead. This account was cast into suspicion, though, as Riel had fired Robinson as the editor of New Nation on 19 March 1870, so it remains unclear whether or not these accounts are based in fact or acted to defame Riel in retaliation for Robinson's dismissal.

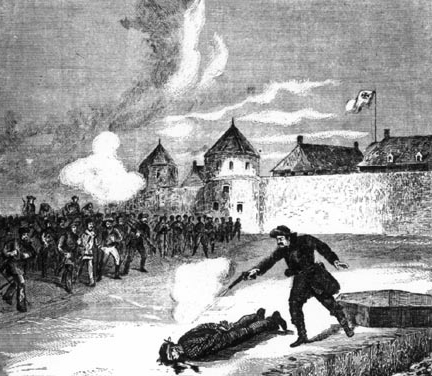
The Tragedy at Fort Garry, March 4, 1870

Upon Scott's death, George Young forwarded Thomas Scott's documents to his brother Hugh. These documents included Scott's commendatory letters and certificates of good character written by Presbyterian minister of whose church Scott had been connected to in Ireland. Additionally his life savings were sent to his brother. It has been suspected that because it was such a substantial amount ($103.50), that this money might have indicated an immoral lifestyle.

Despite all claims regarding the death of Thomas Scott, many observers and testimonies differ in the conditions that Scott had died - details such as whether or not he wore a blindfold, if Riel was present during the execution, and if Scott had actually survived first being shot. With all these details differing and no concrete evidence available that suggests an accurate depiction of the events, there is much to wonder about the legitimacy of Thomas Scott's death and the resulting impacts that shaped Manitoba. In summary, the events that indirectly built Manitoba are interpretations and cannot be proven.

It is not known where Scott's body was laid to rest. In 1870, the supposed burial site of Thomas Scott was revisited by a party of men led by Young. The purpose of this expedition was to bring his body back to Ontario. The party found the reported site of his burial just outside the Hudson's Bay Company store, dug 1.8 metres (6 ft) down. There they discovered the fruit tree box that was meant to be Scott's coffin. The box was discovered partially open and measuring 1.73 metres (5 ft 8 in) in length. No body was found once the box was opened. The box contained only dirt and shavings of some sort. The length of the box has thrown into question whether Scott had ever been buried at that site. He was 188 centimetres (6 ft 2 in) tall and would not have fit into this makeshift coffin which had been said to have been nailed shut. Later, John Bruce claimed that Elzéar Goulet, one of Riel's men who had allegedly disposed of the body, had told him that a week after Scott's execution a hole had been cut in the ice of German Creek about a quarter of a mile from the mouth of the River La Seine. Scott's body was brought to this site and tied in heavy chains and then sunk into the water. Another theory is that his body was taken out of the coffin by a Fenian Winnipegger, the proprietor of the Red Saloon, under whose floor it was buried. Years later, when the site of the business was torn up for road construction, a skeleton was found. Some suggest that the skeleton belonged to Thomas Scott.

== Significance of his death ==
While relatively unknown during his lifetime, once news of Scott's death made it to Ontario he was regarded as a martyr by the English-speaking, Protestant population. At the time, the term "Orangeman" could refer to a Protestant Ulsterman who belonged the Orange Order (established in 1795 to defend the British sovereign and the Protestant religion), or was anti-Catholic. Many Orange Orders claimed Scott, but there is no evidence that he ever claimed the Orange Order. Despite the massive reaction of the Canada First movement, there is no evidence, even in the Metis-inspired versions, of Scott harbouring anti-Catholic sentiment. With opinions divided along ethnic lines during the century following Scott's death, English-speaking historians have depicted the execution of Thomas Scott as the murder of an innocent victim despite Scott's involvement in the death of Norbert Parisien and his reputation for violence. His execution was used to explain Louis Riel's fall from federally recognized politics. It was held that Riel could not be dealt with legitimately because Ontario considered him a murderer. Additionally, the marginalization of Métis peoples in Canada was justified by the Anglo-Canadians' memory of a brutal murder dealt to one of their own.

In contrast, French Canadians and sympathizers have emphasized Scott's problematic behaviour. Historian Lyle Dick said that Scott's martyrdom created a "rallying symbol" for expansionists who wanted the armed force be sent to the Northwest. This fostered higher recruitment rates for the Red River Expedition and hastened its dispatch. Upon learning about Scott's death, the Canadian government dispatched the Wolseley Expedition to Fort Garry from Ontario to seize the fort and force Louis Riel, now branded a murderer, to flee the settlement. Scott's religious affiliation to the Orange Order had repercussions in Ontario as well. The Toronto Globe had published an article that stated Scott was cruelly murdered by the enemies of the Queen, country and religion.

Some sources say Scott's execution turned the Red River Settlement against the leadership of Louis Riel. On 14 April 1870, Macdonald had written to the Earl of Carnarvon that Thomas Scott's men were calling for retribution against Riel for the unjust murder of Scott. The Scott incident also complicated negotiations with the provisional Red River government and Ontario. The Manitoba Act passed shortly after Scott's death, creating the province of Manitoba.

== Memorials and portrayals of Scott in Canada ==
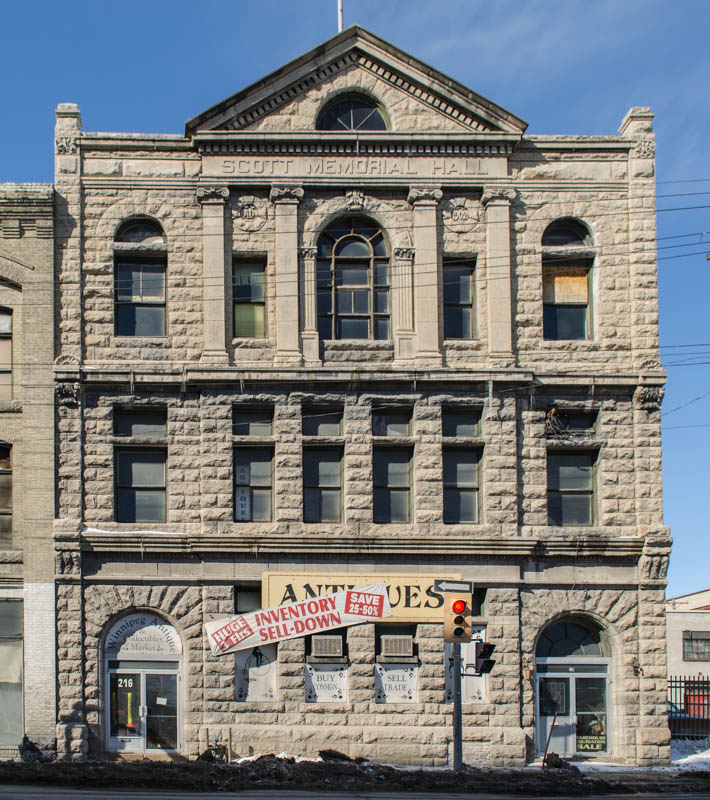
Thomas Scott Memorial Orange Hall, 216–218 Princess Street, Winnipeg

The Thomas Scott Memorial Orange Hall was constructed in 1902 and stood on Princess Street in Winnipeg until its demolition in 2020. The hall was named in commemoration of Scott.

Thomas Scott and his execution is portrayed in sources by many historians controversially. As mentioned, there is plenty of speculation of his behavior in prison, the event of his execution and the way in which he died and was laid to rest. In Louis Riel (comics), Chester Brown portrays Scott as a nuisance. According to Brown, Scott was aggravating, insulting, and rude while imprisoned in Fort Garry. These qualities are supposedly what may have led to his execution. In the George Bloomfield directed movie, Riel (film), Thomas Scott's trial and execution is briefly portrayed. He is depicted as loud and uses offensive words such as "savage." He is only depicted in this way however, after he is convicted and led to his execution.

J. M. Bumsted, a specialist on the topic of the Red River Rebellion, also discusses many popular portrayals of Thomas Scott in his work, Thomas Scott's Body: And Other Essays on Early Manitoba History. Even Bumsted stresses that many stories may have been elaborated on. According to Bumsted, Louis Riel explains Scott's execution for two reasons. First, Scott's negative behavior and actions while in prison, as described by many other historians. Second, Scott is portrayed simply as a pawn being played in a bigger political game. Historians who expand on the behavioral issues claim that both the guards and other captors were aggravated by Scott's words and actions. He is said to have been threatening towards Riel and the guards and used constant obscene language. It is argued in some works that these behaviors are typical of captives who believe they are held unjustly, which Scott certainty believed. Also mentioned earlier, Scott is reported to have suffered diarrhea. It is commonly said by historians that this would have caused him aggravation, resulting in his negative behavior. The diarrhea combined with the annoying behavior however, is argued to have been reason to execute Scott as he was too much to deal with. Bumsted also discusses Scott's portrayal as a "ringleader" in a labour strike against Dawson Road superintendent John Snow, leading to justification for execution. Scott is also portrayed as a heavy drinker and a "barroom brawler." Contradictory, Scott is also portrayed in some works as being quiet and inoffensive, just powerful and determined. His execution in these stories is portrayed as being a factor of a personal animosity between him and Riel. This animosity is depicted in many different versions ranging from Scott offending Riel by telling him to move out of his way on the street, to a rivalry over love for the same women. This version has Scott rescuing a Metisse named Marie from a flood. Scott subsequently protected Marie from Riel and his "clumsy" courtship of her. This led to a hatred of Scott by Riel, causing him to want him executed.

According to Bumsted, the only thing commonly agreed throughout these depictions is that Scott's execution was a political mistake by Louis Riel and the Métis.

== Bibliography ==
- Brown, Chester (2006). Louis Riel A Comic-Strip Biography. New York: Drawn & Quarterly.
- Bumsted, J.M. (1996). The Red River Rebellion. Winnipeg: Watson & Dwyer. ISBN 0920486231. 359 pages
- Bumsted, J.M. (2000). Thomas Scott's Body: And Other Essays in Early Manitoba History. Baltimore: The Johns Hopkins University Press. ISBN 978-0887556456.
- Bumsted, J.M. (2001). Louis Riel v. Canada: The Making of a Rebel. Winnipeg: Great Plains Publications. ISBN 1894283252.
- Bumsted, J.M. (2003). Reporting the Resistance: Alex Begg and Joseph Hargrave on the Red River Resistance. Winnipeg: University of Manitoba Press.
- CBC film (1979). George Bloomfield (with Gary Reineke acting as Thomas Scott) (ed.). Riel.
- CBC Learning (2001). "The Métis Resistance series".
- Dick, Lyle (2004–2005). "Nationalism and Visual Media in Canada: The Case of Thomas Scott's Execution". Manitoba History (48 Autumn/Winter). pp. 2–18
- Flanagan, Thomas (2000). Riel and the Rebellion: 1885 Reconsidered. University of Toronto Press. ISBN 0802082823. 256 pp.
- Marianopolis College (2007). "The "Murder" of Thomas Scott". The Quebec History Encyclopedia. With annotated excerpts from:
  1. Collins, J. E. (1983). Life and Times of the Right Honourable Sir John A. Macdonald, Premier of the Dominion of Canada. Toronto: Rose Publishing Company. 642 pages, excerpt pp. 358–360.
  2. Flanagan, Thomas (1979). Louis 'David" Riel. Prophet of the New World. Goodread biographies (1983 ed.). Toronto: University of Toronto Press. 215 pages, excerpt pp. 29–30.
  3. Stanley, George F. G. (1963). Louis Riel. Toronto: McGraw-Hill Ryerson. 431 pages, excerpt pp. 111–117.
  4. Thomas, Lewis H. (2016) [1982]. "Louis Riel". Dictionary of Canadian Biography.
- McRae, Matthew / activehistory.ca (2020). What's in a name? Thomas Scott and the curious case of the forgotten memorial. Active History (published 4 March 2020).
- Morton, Desmond (1998). "Image of Louis Riel in 1998". Canadian Speeches. 12 (May 1998). Archived from the original on 1 January 2016 – via Questia. Favourable to Scott
- QHS (1980). Qu'Appelle: Footprints to Progress: A History of Qu'Appelle and District. Qu'Appelle SK: Qu'Appelle Historical Society (QHS). ISBN 978-0889252158.
- Rambaut, Thomas (1887). "The Hudson's Bay Half-Breeds and Louis Riel's Rebellions". Political Science Quarterly. 2 (1): 135–167. doi:10.2307/2139321. JSTOR 2139321.
- Rea, J. E. (1976). "Scott, Thomas (d. 1870)". Dictionary of Canadian Biography. Vol. 9. University of Toronto/Université Laval.
- "Louis Riel - Thomas Scott". SHSB, Centre du patrimoine. Société historique de St-Boniface (SHSB). 2015. Archived from the original on 28 October 2013.
- Trémaudan, Auguste de (1976) [1925]. "The Métis Resistance". Canadian Historical Review: 222–236.
