= English Harbour (disambiguation) =

English Harbour may refer to:

- English Harbour, Antigua
- English Harbour, Newfoundland and Labrador
- English Harbour East, Newfoundland and Labrador
- English Harbour West, Newfoundland and Labrador
- Paelau, Kiribati, formerly known as English Harbour

== See also ==
- English Bay (disambiguation)
