= Alfred Henry Scott (Canadian politician) =

Alfred Henry Scott (c. 1840 – 28 May 1872) was a bartender and clerk at the Red River Colony community of Saint Boniface, Manitoba, and was noted for having been selected as a delegate to represent the provisional government of Louis Riel in negotiations with the Government of Canada during the Red River Rebellion of 1869–1870.
