= Anse aux Anglais =

Village in Mauritius

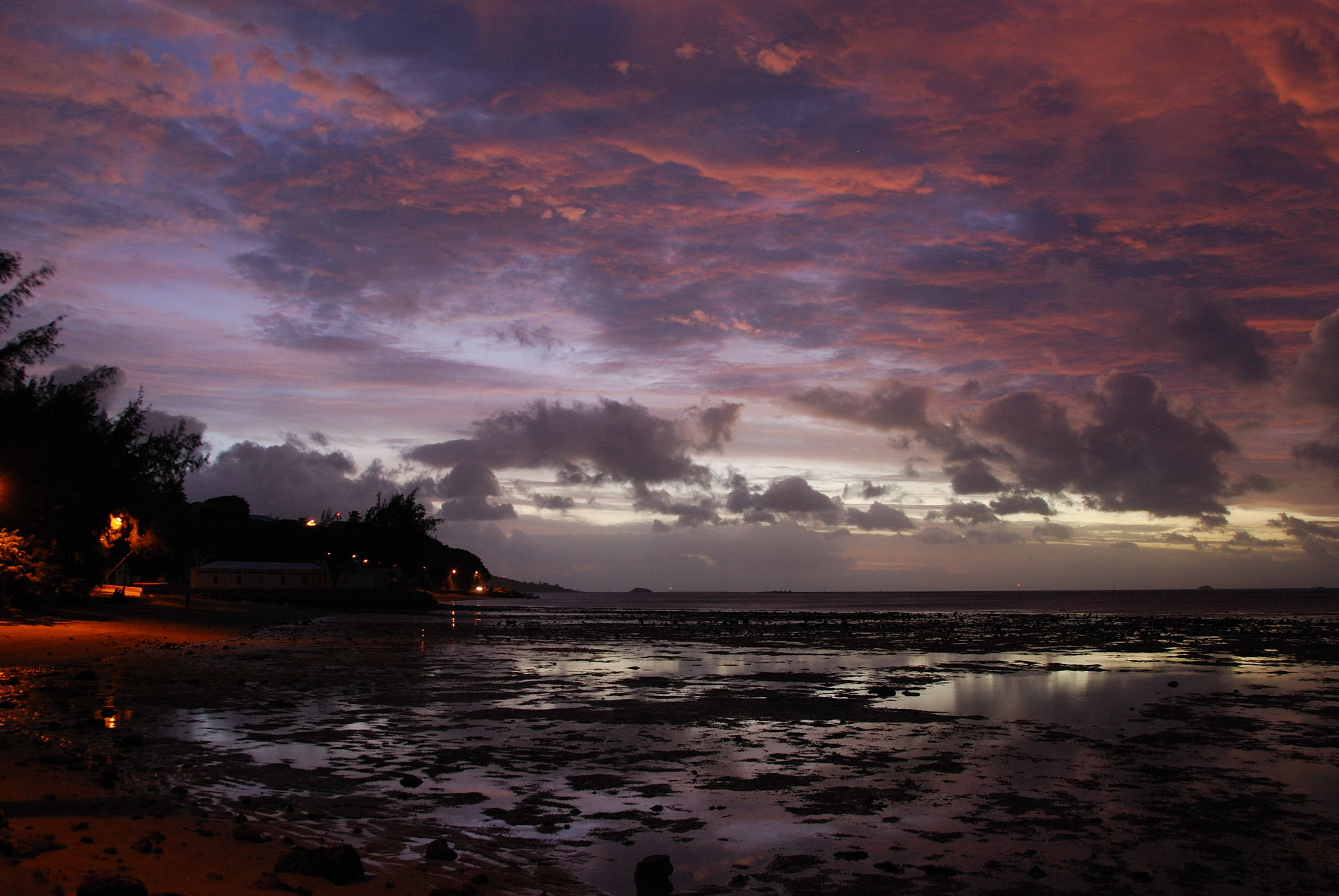
- Interactive map of Anse aux Anglais
- Coordinates: 19°40′S 63°26′E
- Country: Mauritius
- Island: Rodrigues
- Time zone: UTC+4 (MUT)
  - Summer (DST): UTC+5
- Climate: Aw

Anse aux Anglais or English Bay is a small coastal village located in the north of the Mauritian island of Rodrigues in the Indian Ocean. Its name, French for "English Bay," is apparently linked with the fact that English troops landed on its beach in 1809 during the Napoleonic Wars between France and Great Britain.

French writer of Mauritian origin, J. M. G. Le Clézio situated the plot of his book Le Chercheur d’or in this village.

The village is about 2 km from the main location, Port Mathurin. The main economic activities are tourism and fishing.
