= Canadian Party =

- Leader: John Christian Schultz
- Founded: 1869
- Dissolved: 1872
- Succeeded by: Conservatives; Liberals
- Ideology: Imperialism; Colonialism; Canadian nationalism Agrarianism; Expansionism

The Canadian Party was a group founded by John Christian Schultz in 1869, in the Red River Colony (which later became the Canadian province of Manitoba). It was not a political party in the modern sense but was rather a forum for local ultra-Protestant agitators.

The Canadian Party promoted the annexation of the Red River Colony by the Canadian government. It also encouraged settlement by Anglophone Protestants from the province of Ontario.

Schultz's goal was to reconstruct the Red River Colony in the image of Protestant Ontario. To this end, his followers were engaged in extensive land speculation in the region. They were regarded with suspicion by most of the established settlers, and particularly by the local Métis population led by Louis Riel.

Members of the Canadian Party engaged in military skirmishes with Riel's provisional government during the Red River Rebellion of 1869-70. After fleeing to Ontario, Schultz, assisted by supporters of the Canada First movement, was instrumental in exploiting the execution of Thomas Scott to inflame Protestant opinion in Ontario against Riel.

Following the Manitoba Act of 1870, the Canadian government "pacified" the Red River Colony through the use of Canadian militia soldiers in mid-1870. The Canadian Party, however, was not accepted into the new governing structure of the age. The federal government of John A. Macdonald favoured a policy of conciliation among the province's ethnic, linguistic and religious groups, and Lieutenant-Governor Adams George Archibald kept Schultz's followers out of his first cabinet.

In Manitoba's first general election (December 30, 1870), Schultz's followers were the only real opposition to the governing alliance. They won only five seats, one of which was overturned on appeal. Schultz was personally defeated in Winnipeg and St. John.

The Canadian Party continued to exist as a loose alliance after the election. At one stage, Lt. Governor Archibald warned Macdonald that its members were plotting the "extermination" of the Métis.

The party did not long survive as a coherent organization, but Edward Hay appears to have turned against Schultz in 1872, and later joined the government of francophone Premier Marc-Amable Girard. Some members of the Canadian Party would later resurface as Liberals, others as Conservatives.

== See also ==
- Canada First
