= Historiography of Louis Riel =

Due to Louis Riel's ubiquity as one of the most studied figures in Canadian history, the historiography of Louis Riel naturally leads to several interpretations and understandings of actions and reactions depending on the scholar in question. One of the reasons the rebellion or resistance paradigm is so deeply ingrained in the Canadian historical tradition is because Riel has been studied so much. Still this article's challenge is to discover Riel as a human being and to "appreciate the pathos and tragedy" of his life and of Métis history, not to "create, debunk, or venerate" an icon.

== Early studies ==
The first history, entitled A critical history of the Red River Insurrection, after official documents and non-Catholic sources by the Reverend A. G. Morice, was published in 1935, the main purpose of which was the defence of Bishop Taché. Dissatisfaction with Morice's book on the part of the Métis comité historique of the Union Nationale Métisse led to Auguste-Henri Trémaudan being commissioned to write Histoire de la nation métisse dans l'Ouest canadien published in 1936, which provided a more favorable account of the two resistances and which portrayed Riel as 'a nationalist and a leader of a small group of people oppressed by English Canada'.

In 1936 also, George Stanley published The Birth of Western Canada: A History of the Riel Rebellions, which rebellions were not manifestations of the "western battle ground of the traditional hostilities of French Catholic Quebec and English Protestant Ontario" but of the problem of the frontier, of the primitive versus the civilized, of Riel versus the West. In 1945, the French author Marcel Giraud published the massive brilliantly researched Le Métis canadien, son rôle dans l'histoire des prairies de l'Ouest, which "further cemented the idea that the Métis nation was born of conflict and war". However, these mid-century efforts by Stanley, Giraud and other historians had little impact and it was not until after World War II that Riel was progressively transformed into a national hero. It was especially when historians de-emphasized representing him as a French Catholic Canadian that Riel gained prestige among anglophones.

Published in 1957, W.L. Morton's Manitoba: A History portrays the Red River Colony as "a microcosm of the struggle for Canada" with "a balance between French-Catholic Métis and British-Protestant settlers". Stanley's Louis Riel published in 1963 is considered to be the benchmark among Riel studies and sets Riel "up to fight a losing battle against the Canadian state."

== Regional studies ==
In the 1960s and 1970s, regional studies increasingly displaced and fragmented the earlier generation of sweeping studies with authors such as Flanagan and Martel arguing, for example, that Riel should be "understood as a messianic prophet struggling against modernity". While revisiting Riel's motivations, these studies left Stanley's more sweeping tenets of conflict between savage and civilized intact such that Riel "remained a figure of resistance".

== Contemporary studies ==
In the 1980s, historians appeared to be less interested in 'great man' aspects of Riel and more interested in Métis history, probing the "Red River myopia", and viewing Riel "as the leader of a much broader social movement across Canada". For example, the 1996 publication of Homeland to Hinterland: The Changing World of the Red River Métis is remarkable for situating Red River Métis between the social and political. Published in 2003, Albert Braz's study The False Traitor was a landmark in investigating dimensions of Riel's life that served to "create an "other" against which Canadian can define themselves". Yet some recent biographies such as Maggie Siggins's liberal-humanistic Riel: A Life of Revolution and J. M. Bumsted's Riel vs. Canada: The Making of a Rebel still paint Riel as Canada's other whereby Riel and the resistance remains fixed in a politico-military framework largely devoid of intellectual and cultural dynamics. For such recent theorists as Adam Gaudry, Darren O'Toole and Chris Andersen, "the resistance is a central element of Métis nationhood".

In 1988, Stanley referred to Riel as a "Canadian legend" and “our Hamlet, the personification of the great themes of our human history.”

== Mental health and trial studies ==
In his 2008 paper Non Compos Mentis: A Meta-Historical Survey of the Historiographic Narratives of Louis Riel's 'Insanity, Gregory Betts's analyzes Riel's high treason trial and related mental health issue in the context of Stanley's four proposed Riel critical perspective categories, "Defender of French language and religious rights, Half-breed patriot, Riel, First western Canadian leader, and Prophet and visionary", these four ideological boundaries representing "one of the first meta-historical gestures at elevating Riel histories to a self-conscious awareness of how historians participate in determining the meaning of events". Betts concludes that two constants persist in all interpretations of Louis Riel's insanity, his insanity is morally repugnant and had he been conclusively proven insane, the moral integrity of his life and politics would have suffered. Betts cites Siggins and Stanley to the effect that Riel was not insane. Betts ends his paper's conclusion thus: A harrowing silence intermingled with doubt pervades all those touched by the asylum: regardless of the people they might have been or heroes they might become.

Published in 1975, Brown's article The Meaning of Treason in 1885 raises a number of probing questions. Was the charge of treason properly applicable to Riel's crime? Was it legal to lay such a charge against a citizen of the United States? Was the 1352 Statute of Treason's the law in the Northwest Territories at the time of Riel's trial? He concludes that "at law it was a proper charge to lay against Riel", that Riel's U. S. citizenship did not matter since "he was a British subject till his death", and "he was legally chargeable as alien under the doctrine of local allegiance".

In 2021, the RCMP Heritage Centre hosted the 55th anniversary of the production of John Coulter's stage play Trial of Louis Riel, in which production announcement and program archives George Goulet is cited in issues he raises about Riel's mistreatment at the hands of his own seriously deficient counsel, improper trial-related correspondence between John A. Macdonald and Justice Minister Alexander Campbell, John A. Macdonald's handling and rejection of jury's unanimous recommendation for mercy, and "Macdonald's blatant attempts of manipulation, deception, and mendacity" within the medical commission's reports prior to execution.

== Riel and historical practice ==
According to Hamon:

Linked to national crises, particularly the Resistances (previously called Rebellions) of 1869 and 1885, Riel is probably the most written about person in Canadian history. As a result, he has been presented and re-presented for different interests: Catholic martyr to Protestant violence, a French patriot crushed by English fanatics, a spiritual leader, a deranged lunatic, the father of a nation, and an Indigenous hero. This introduction reflects on the significance of Riel for Canadian historical research and writing over the hundred years of existence of the Canadian Historical Review (CHR). It argues that the CHR has been an important vehicle for the professionalization of historical practice in Canada, and Riel has played an important part in that process. This introductory essay provides context and a discussion of the shifting approaches and interpretations of Riel in the CHR, identifying four phases: Civilizing and un-Civilizing Riel; Americanizing and un-Americanizing Riel; Mystifying and De-Mystifying Riel; and Provincializing Canada. It concludes that the history of Louis Riel is entwined with the emergence of professional history in Canada.

== Bibliography ==
- Braz, Albert (2003). "The False Traitor: Louis Riel in Canadian Culture". The Canadian Historical Review. 85 (4). University of Toronto Press: 832–834. doi:10.1353/can.2005.0027. S2CID 144956681. Book preview link
- Barkwell, Lawrence J.; Dorion, Leah; Prefontaine, Darren (2001). Metis Legacy: A Historiography and Annotated Bibliography (PDF). Pemmican Publications Inc. / Gabriel Dumont Institute. ISBN 1-894717-03-1.
- Betts, Gregory (2008). "Non Compos Mentis: A Meta-Historical Survey of the Historiographic Narratives of Louis Riel's 'Insanity'" (PDF). International Journal of Canadian Studies (38): 15–40. doi:10.7202/040805ar.
- Beyer, Peter (1981). The religious beliefs of Louis Riel : an analysis using the sociological theory of Niklas Luhmann. School of Theology. Canadian theses on microfiche 52708. Toronto: University of St. Michael's College.|
- Beyer, Peter (March 1, 1984). "La vision religieuse de Louis Riel: L'ultramontanisme Canadien-français au service de la nation métisse". Studies in Religion/Sciences Religieuses. 13 (1) (1st ed.): 87–100. doi:10.1177/000842988401300109. S2CID 151731629.
- Brown, D.H. (1975). "Meaning of Treason in 1885", 28 (2): 65-80 Saskatchewan History.
- Brown, J. (Jan 1987). "People of Myth, People of History: A Look at Recent Writings on the Metis". Acadiensis. 17 (1): 150–162. JSTOR 30302797.
- Brown, J. (2007). Noms et métaphores dans l’historiographie métisse : anciennes catégories et nouvelles perspectives. Recherches amérindiennes au Québec, 37(2-3), 7–14.
- Bruyneel, Kevin (2010). "Exiled, Executed, Exalted: Louis Riel, "Homo Sacer" and the Production of Canadian Sovereignty". Canadian Journal of Political Science. 43 (3): 711–32. doi:10.1017/S0008423910000612. JSTOR 40983515. S2CID 231894384.
- Bumsted, J. M. (1987). "The 'Mahdi' of Western Canada: Louis Riel and His Papers". The Beaver. 67 (4): 47–54.
- Dick, L. (1991). The Seven Oaks Incident and the Construction of a Historical Tradition, 1816 to 1970. Journal of the Canadian Historical Association / Revue de la Société historique du Canada, 2(1), 91–113.
- Dick, Lyle (2004–2005). "Nationalism and Visual Media in Canada: The Case of Thomas Scott's Execution". Manitoba History (48): 2–18.
- Flanagan, Thomas (1986). "Louis Riel: Icon of the Left". Transactions of the Royal Society of Canada. 1: 219–228.
- Flanagan, Thomas (1992). Louis Riel (PDF). Historical Booklet No. 50. Ottawa: Canadian Historical Assoc. ISBN 0-88798-180-1. Notable general bibliography.
- Flanagan, Thomas (2000). Riel and the Rebellion: 1885 Reconsidered (2nd ed.). U of Toronto Press.
- Gaudry, Adam (2013). "The Métis-ization of Canada: The Process of Claiming Louis Riel, Métissage, and the Métis People as Canada's Mythical Origin". Aboriginal Policy Studies. 2 (2): 64–87.
- Gaudry, Adam; Welch, Mary Agnes; Gallant, David (September 11, 2019) [January 7, 2009]. "Métis". The Canadian Encyclopedia.
- Giraud, Marcel (1945), Le Métis canadien, son rôle dans l'histoire des prairies de l'Ouest, Paris, Institut d'ethnographie, 1 296 p.. Reprinted in 2 vols., with introduction by J.E. Foster with Louise Zuk, Saint-Boniface, Man.: Éditions du Blé, 1984. Translated by George Woodcock as, The Metis in the Canadian West, Edmonton: University of Alberta Press, 1986 (631pp.; 729 pages
- Goulet, George R. D. (1999). The Trial of Louis Riel: Justice and Mercy Denied: A Critical Legal and Political Analysis. Calgary: Tellwell Publishing. ISBN 0-9685489-0-3.
- Hamon, M. Max (2019). The Audacity of His Enterprise: Louis Riel and the Métis Nation That Canada Never Was, 1840–1875. McGill-Queen's Press. p. 414. ISBN 978-0228000099.
- Hamon, M. Max (June 2021). "Re-presenting Riel: 100 Years". Canadian Historical Review. 102 (s1): s1–s31M. doi:10.3138/chr-102.s1-000. S2CID 238759993. "Max Hamon is the Buchanan post-doctoral Fellow at Queen's University, Kingston, Ontario.".
- LeBel, Sylvie (2003). "Le parcours identitaire des Métis du Canada : évolution, dynamisme et mythes". In Langlois, S.; Létourneau, J. (eds.). Aspects de la nouvelle francophonie canadienne. Québec: Presses de l’Université Laval. pp. 75–94. ISBN 2-7637-8083-0.
- Henderson, Matt (Feb. 29, 2020). "Recasting Riel, Historian claims Métis leader's role, significance has been misinterpreted", Winnipeg Free Press, review of M. Max Hamon's The Audacity of His Enterprise: Louis Riel and the Métis Nation That Canada Never Was.
- Huel, Raymond (1985). "The Clergyman as Historian: the Rev. A.-G. Morice, O.M.I., and Riel Historiography" (PDF). University of Lethbridge. CCHA Historical Studies. 52: 83–96.
- Madill, D. (July 1983). Select Annotaded Bibliography on Métis History and Claims (PDF). Treaties and Historical Research Centre, Research Branch, Corporate Policy. Ottawa: Indian and Northern Affairs Canada. 45 pages
- Miller, James Rodger (1988). "From Riel to the Metis". Canadian Historical Review. 69 (1): 1–20. doi:10.3138/CHR-069-01-01. S2CID 154383622.
- Miller, James Rodger (2004). "From Riel to the Métis". Reflections on Native-newcomer Relations: Selected Essays. University of Toronto Press. pp. 37–60.
- Milne, Brad (Autumn 1995). "The Historiography of Métis Land Dispersal, 1870-189". History Department, University of Manitoba. Manitoba History (30). Manitoba Historical Society.
- Morton, Desmond (May 1998). "Image of Louis Riel in 1998". Canadian Speeches. 12 (2).
- Morton, W. L. (1957, republished 1976). Manitoba: A History. University of Toronto Press..
- Morton, W. L. (1970). "The Historiography of the Great West". Historical Papers / Communications Historiques. 5 (1): 46–59. doi:10.7202/030722ar.
- Mossmann, Manfred (1985). "The Charismatic Pattern: Canada's Riel Rebellion of 1885 as a Millenarian Protest Movement," Prairie Forum, 10(2): 307–325.
- Owram, Douglas (September 1982). "The Myth of Louis Riel". Canadian Historical Review. 63 (3): 315–336. doi:10.3138/CHR-063-03-01. Published online April 18, 2008
- Owram, Doug, ed. (1994). Canadian History: Confederation to the present. Canadian History: A Reader's Guide. Vol. 2. University of Toronto Press. pp. 18, 168, 191–95, 347–50. ISBN 9780802076762.
- Nieguth, Tim, ed. (2015). The politics of popular culture: negotiating power, identity, and place. Montreal Kingston: McGill-Queen's University Press. ISBN 978-0-7735-4471-0.
- Pannekoek, Frits (Spring 1981). "The Historiography of the Red River Settlement, 1830-1868, Canadian Plains Research Center, Prairie Forum, Vol. VI, No. 1|pp. 75–85.
- Payment, Diane Paulette (1999). "Les héritiers et héritières de Louis Riel: un aperçu des relations entre les Métis et les Canadiens français dans l'Ouest canadien". In Waddell, Eric (ed.). Le dialogue avec les cultures minoritaires. Ste-Foy: Les Presses de l’Université Laval. ISBN 2-7637-7634-5.
- Read, Geoff; Webb, Todd (June 2012). "The Catholic Mahdi of the North West': Louis Riel and the Metis Resistance in Transatlantic and Imperial Context". Canadian Historical Review. 93 (2): 171–195. doi:10.3138/chr.93.2.171. S2CID 159632535.
- Reid, Jennifer (2008). Louis Riel and the Creation of Modern Canada: Mythic Discourse and the Postcolonial State. Albuquerque: University of New Mexico Press. ISBN 978-0-8263-4415-1.
- Rivard, É. (2016). Les Bois-Brûlés et le Canada français : une histoire de famille éclatée. Bulletin d'histoire politique, 24(2), 55–74.
- "Louis Riel and modern culture" (PDF). Société historique de Saint-Boniface, Centre du patrimoine.
- Teillet, Jean; Wardhaugh, Robert (ed.) Carter, Sarah; Chartrand, David; Duhamel, Karine; Ferguson, Barry; Friesen, Gerald; Kermoal, Nathalie; Machoruk, James; Mailhot, Philippe; St-Onge, Nicole; Teillet, Jean; Tough, Frank J.; Wardhaugh, Robert (2021). "Manitoba and Canada's North-West: Founders and Builders" (PDF). Canadian Issues. Association for Canadian Studies.
- Trémaudan, Auguste-Henri de (1936). Histoire de la nation métisse dans l'Ouest canadien, Montréal: Editions A. Lévesque.
- Sprague, D.N. (1988). "Historiographical introduction". In Waddell, Eric (ed.). Canada and the Métis, 1869-1885. pp. 1–17.
- Stanley, George F.G. (1979). "Louis Riel: Patriot or Rebel?" (PDF). Canadian Historical Association Booklet No. 2. Archived from the original (PDF) on 2015-05-06.
- Thomas, Lewis H. (2016) [1982]. "Riel, Louis (1844-85)". Dictionary of Canadian Biography. Vol. 11. University of Toronto / Université Laval. Notable general bibliography.
