= John Bruce (Canada) =

Canadian politician

John Bruce c. 1869

John Bruce (or Brousse; died 26 October 1893) was the first president of the Métis provisional government at the Red River Colony during the Red River Rebellion of 1869. He resigned because he was sick and his secretary, Louis Riel, became the president.

The son of Pierre Bruce and Marguerite Desrosiers, he was a carpenter by trade. Bruce married Angélique Gaudry; they had five children. He was a member of the Legislative Assembly of Assiniboia and served as Superintendent of Public Works for the Provisional Government of Manitoba.

Bruce was recorded in 1849 as living in St. Boniface. In 1877, he received his patent for a lot in St. Norbert. He was recorded as living in St. Joseph Township, Pembina County, North Dakota in 1879–80. Bruce died in Leroy, North Dakota in 1893 after falling ill the previous year. He was buried in the cemetery of the Roman Catholic church.
