= Wolseley expedition =

1870 Canadian military operation

- Part of Red River Rebellion
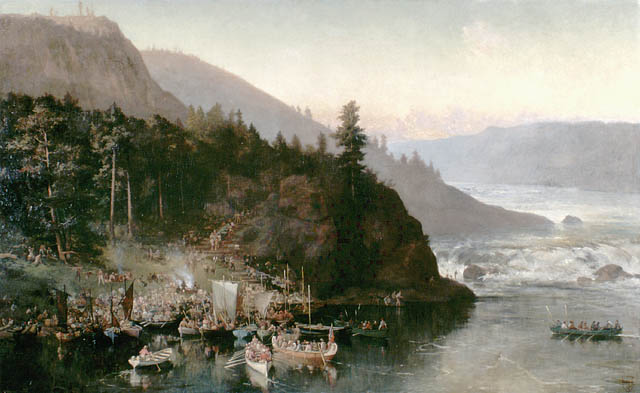
- Red River Expedition at Kakabeka Falls by Frances Anne Hopkins, 1877
Date	1870
Location	Fort Garry (modern-day Winnipeg, Manitoba, Canada)
Result	Bloodless Government victory; Government forces capture Fort Garry; Louis Riel escapes

Belligerents
Canada; United Kingdom	Métis

Commanders and leaders
Garnet Wolseley	Louis Riel

Casualties and losses
None	No immediate casualties; at least one later killed by militia

The Wolseley expedition was a military force authorized by Canadian Prime Minister John A. Macdonald to confront Louis Riel and the Métis in 1870, during the Red River Rebellion, at the Red River Colony in what is now the province of Manitoba. The expedition was also intended to counter American expansionist sentiments in northern border states. Leaving Toronto in May, the expedition arrived, after a three-month journey in arduous conditions, at Fort Garry on August 24. This extinguished Riel's provisional government and eradicated the threat of the American expansion into western Canada.

== Background ==
Prior to the deployment of the Wolseley Expedition, there had been a series of resistances led by Louis Riel. The Métis led by Riel at Red River were dissatisfied with the Canadian government's deal with the Hudson's Bay Company (HBC) concerning the transfer of Rupert's Land. Riel was angry that there was no official communication between the government at Red River Settlement and the Canadian government informing them of a new governor, William McDougall, who had been dispatched to assume control over the settlement. The first major clash of the Red River Rebellion came when government land surveyors arrived at the Red River Settlement on October 11, 1869. A group of Métis soldiers obstructed the surveyor's work and forced them from the settlement. Following this clash, Riel prevented McDougall from entering Rupert's Land, took over Upper Fort Garry and established a provisional government. Prime Minister John A. Macdonald proposed in 1869 that a force of police officer troops be sent to Manitoba to control the Métis in the area. He wished to model this police force after the Irish Constabulary with not only riflemen but also a mounted force. However, this motion was not acted upon, and was later reorganized into the military expedition under Garnet Wolseley. In January and February 1870 Riel led a series of failed negotiations with the federal government and the HBC. On March 4, 1870, Riel executed Thomas Scott, a loyal supporter of the Canadian government. There are various reasons given for his execution, including considering it an attempt to compel the Canadians into real negotiations, to Riel's disliking Thomas Scott. The true reason for the execution of Scott remains uncertain, but Peter McArthur's firsthand account of the events suggests that Scott was considerably outspoken regarding his opinion of the Métis and needs of prisoners, which may have angered Riel.

== History ==
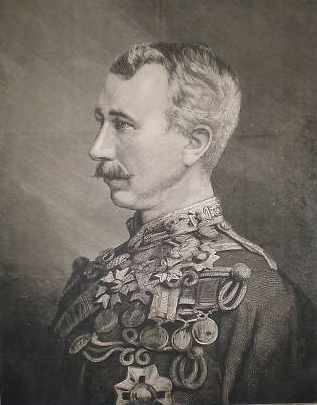
Major General Wolseley

Under the leadership of Colonel Garnet Wolseley the expedition set out in May 1870 from Toronto's New Fort York in an attempt to interdict Riel. Previously, British and Canadian officials such as McDougall had been permitted to enter the western territories of British North America via the United States. However, the U.S. government steadfastly refused to grant permission for British or Canadian troops to cross U.S. soil. It was widely thought to be impossible to move a military force into Western Canada via an all-Canadian route, the Dawson Road having been mapped out only three years earlier and the railway still many years away.

The Dawson Road is so named after its original architect, Simon James Dawson, who was given the contract to construct a road, large enough for the passage of wagon-laden horses, that stretched from the shores of Lake Superior to the navigable waters of the interior. Dawson was tasked with having the road passable by May 1, when the expedition was due to arrive at that stage of the journey. However, due to unfavourable weather in the form of rain, and a series of forest fires prior to the rainfall, the road was not completed on time. Wolseley ordered a work party consisting of soldiers to aid in the road construction. After working from May 25 until mid-way through July, Wolseley cut a path from the road to the Winnipeg River. The only other upset to the plans was the turnabout of Lake of the Woods set before the mouth of the Winnipeg River. Wolseley and his flotilla were lost for several days before finally finding their portage. Wolseley sent Indian paddlers back to the other flotillas to assist in their journey across the lake. The difficulties were overcome, and the force arrived at Winnipeg in August.

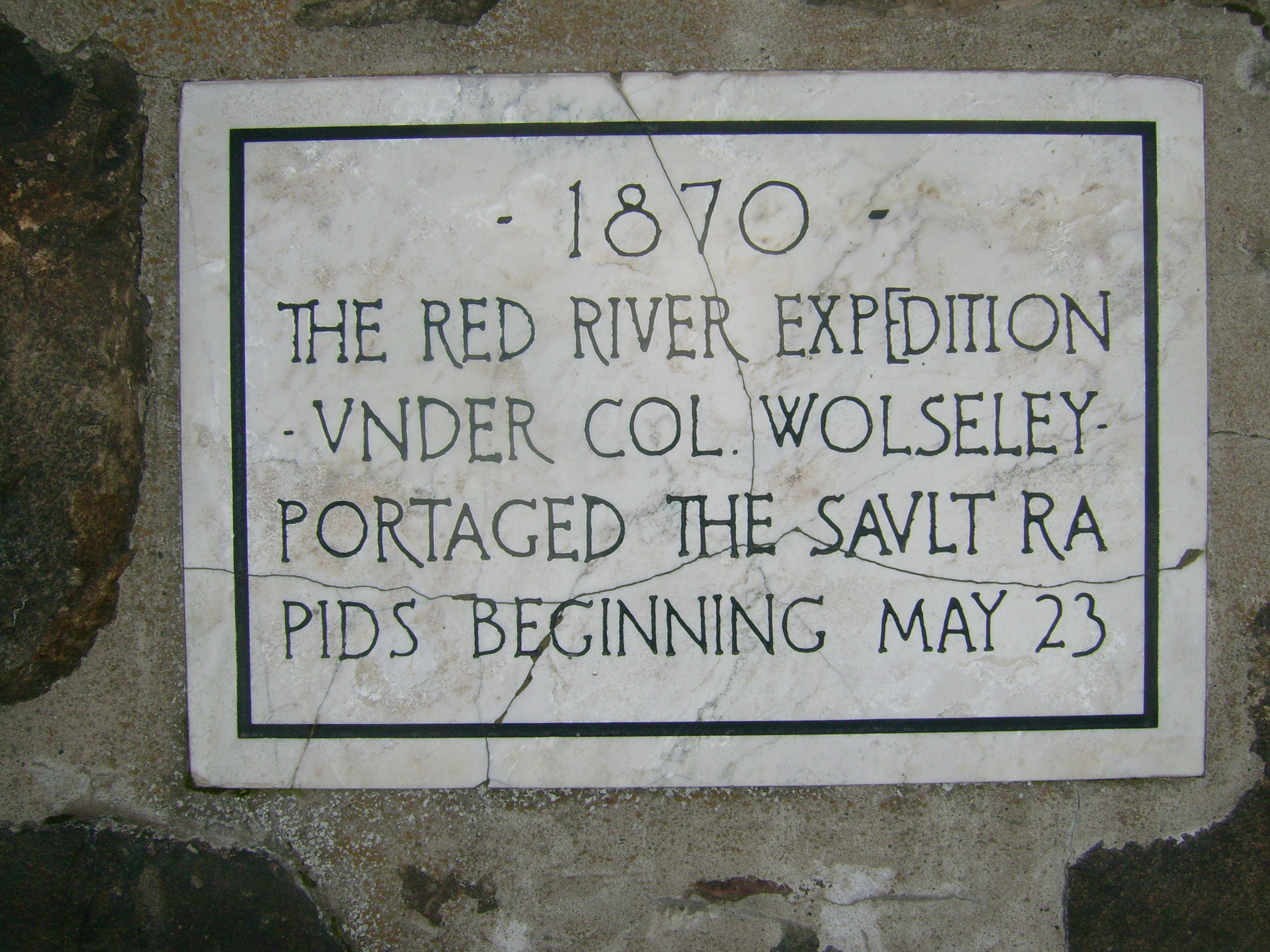
Cairn in Sault Ste. Marie commemorating the Wolseley Expedition's portage around the St. Marys Rapids.

The expedition travelled to Georgian Bay, then by steamer across Lake Huron to the U.S. Sault Canal where men and materiel had to be transported on the Canadian side of the river. The two steamers hired by the Canadian government were the Algoma and the Chicora. The St. Marys canal went through the territory of the United States, critical to moving supplies northward. The first steamer, the Algoma, made it through before the Chichora was stopped. American border agents stopped the steamers due to the movement of soldiers and the materials of war, which were viewed as a threat. The U.S. authorities forced Wolseley to unload the Chicora of all soldiers and materials of wars prior to permitting it to pass. Wolseley then arranged the 4.8 km (3 mi) portage of the soldiers and materials upriver on the Canadian side of the river to be loaded back onto the awaiting Algoma. The expedition then proceeded across Lake Superior to the Department of Public Works station at Thunder Bay, which Wolseley named Prince Arthur's Landing on May 25, in honour of Queen Victoria's third son. From there the troops carried small boats to Lake Shebandowan. On August 3, the first brigades of canoes started their journey towards Fort Garry, leaving from the shores of Shebandowan. The brigades followed the original HBC trapping line until they reached Kashabowie Lake, when they began to follow a new route which Dawson had found and constructed. Travelling further westwards, they passed through Fort Frances, arriving on August 4. Wolseley made it to Lake of the Woods; however, he lost his way. On August 15 he finally made Rat Portage with his flotilla and sent Iroquois guides back to help the remaining brigades cross the river. They proceeded down the Winnipeg River and across the south basin of Lake Winnipeg to the Red River finally arriving at Fort Garry in late August.

Wolseley formed up his troops and immediately began his advance on Upper Fort Garry. According to first-hand accounts of the troops marching on the fort, the southern gate stood thrown open, and the fort was abandoned. Fort Garry was officially reported as being taken back into the Canadian government's control as of August 24 with a ceremonial raising of the Union Jack. Louis Riel and his followers abandoned Fort Garry resulting in a bloodless victory for Wolseley. The lack of resistance to the Wolseley expedition has been attributed to both the remoteness of the location and the federal government's efforts to avoid provoking the local inhabitants into further rebellion.

An eyewitness account of the expedition's arrival at Upper Fort Garry provided by a member of the expedition, William Perrin, appeared in the Manitoba Free Press in August 1900 on the 30th anniversary of the arrival. Perrin was a regular British soldier of the 60th (The King's Royal Rifle Corps) Regiment of Foot.

The expedition is considered by military historians to have been among the most arduous in history. Over 1000 men had to transport all their provisions and weaponry, including cannon, over hundreds of miles of wilderness. At numerous portages, corduroy roads had to be constructed. As these jobs were being done the troops had to endure life in the bush for over two months, in summer heat and the inevitable plagues of blackflies and mosquitoes.

While Wolseley was able to maintain strict military discipline among the British regulars under his command, the militiamen wanted to avenge the execution of Thomas Scott. Moreover, the British soldiers promptly returned to Ontario, leaving the militia to garrison the community. Militia harassment of Métis exacerbated already intense feelings, and at least one death resulted.

== Imperial and Canadian military forces in the Red River Rebellion ==
Imperial military forces:

- 1st Battalion, 60th (The King's Royal Rifle Corps) Regiment of Foot: a battalion from the British Army, overseen by Colonel R.J. Feilden. Colonel Feilden was second in command of the entire expedition and oversaw 26 officers and 350 men. These forces were known as the 'Regulars' and were provided by the British Army.
- Detachment of Royal Artillery: overseen by Lieutenant Alleyne was also a part of the expedition. The detachment included 19 soldiers with a battery of four 7-pounder brass mountain guns.
- Detachment of Royal Engineers: also accompanied the expedition. These 19 engineers were overseen by Lieutenant Frederick W. Heneage. This detachment was mainly concerned with the building of the Dawson Road in preparation for the main expeditionary force.
- Detachment of Army Service Corps
- Detachment of Army Hospital Corps

Canadian Militia:

- 1st (Ontario) Rifles: a battalion of volunteer soldiers from Ontario. The militia of Ontario is reported to have been keen on marching on the Red River Colony due to the death of Thomas Scott who hailed from the province. Lieutenant-Colonel Jarvis oversaw this force of 28 officers and 350 soldiers, all of which were volunteers.
- 2nd (Quebec) Rifles: a battalion from Quebec. Reports from the time state that there was very little interest among the people of Quebec for the expedition. Upon the first wave of recruits, only 88 out 350 soldiers in the battalion were French speaking. The remaining were to be filled by English speakers. This battalion was overseen by Lieutenant-Colonel Casault along with his staff of 28 officers.

Transportation personnel: The expedition relied on the company of voyageurs and teamsters to provide their transportation. Over 400 Aboriginal voyageurs were hired to handle the canoes. Reports from the expedition comment on the 100 Iroquois voyageurs from the Montreal area as being the most reliable and best equipped to handle rapid moving water. Along with the use of boat to transport men and equipment, 150 horses and 100 teamsters; men who handle horses and wagons were hired. These men were primarily meant to transport material and men from Thunder Bay to Shebandowen Lake along the Dawson Road.

The North-West Mounted Police, established three years later in 1873, did not take part in the expedition.

== Legacy ==
Following the successful completion of the expedition, Wolseley penned a tribute to his men in recognition of their extraordinary efforts.

The expedition's inability to sail through the Soo Locks on the Michigan (US) side of the river led to a federal government effort to build a water passageway on the Ontario side. This resulted in construction of the Sault Ste. Marie Canal, completed in 1895. That canal is now used for recreational boating as part of the national park system, and is a National Historic Site managed by Parks Canada.

The Red River Expedition of 1870 was named a National Historic Event on January 12, 2018.

The street adjacent to the site of Wolseley's landing in the City of Thunder Bay is named Wolseley Street.

== Bibliography ==
- Dawson, Simon James (1871). Report on the Red River expedition of 1870. Ottawa: The House of Commons: Reprint, with remarks on certain strictures published in England by an officer of the expeditionary force. Printed by the Times Printing & Publishing Co.
- Friesen, Gerald (1987). The Canadian Prairies: A History. University of Toronto Press. ISBN 978-0-8020-6648-0.
- Grebstad, David W. (Summer 2013). "Rowboat Diplomacy: The Dominion of Canada's Whole of Government approach to the Red River Rebellion" (PDF). Canadian Military Journal. 13 (3): 57–66.
- Low, Charles Rathbone (1878). A Memoir of Lieutenant-General Sir Garnet J. Wolseley. R. Bentley.
- Reid, Jennifer (2008). Louis Riel and the Creation of Modern Canada: Mythic Discourse and the Postcolonial State. Albuquerque: University of New Mexico. ISBN 978-0-8263-4415-1.
- Stanley, George F. G. (1992) [1960]. The Birth of Western Canada: A History of the Riel Rebellions. Toronto: University of Toronto Press. ISBN 978-0-8020-6931-3.
- Torrance, Judy (1988). Public Violence in Canada, 1867-1982. McGill-Queen's Press - MQUP. ISBN 978-0-7735-6179-3.
