= English Bay (neighbourhood) =

Coordinates: 49.2864°N 123.1410°W

- Neighbourhood
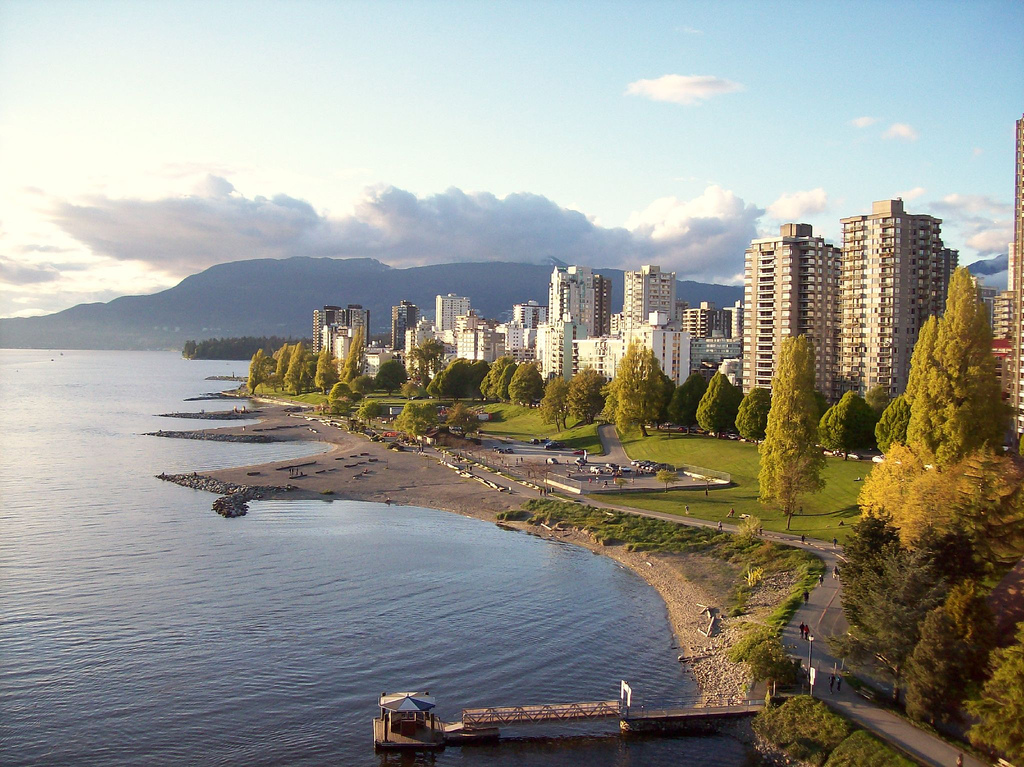

Population
  - Total: 16,917
  - Density: 24,310/km^{2} (63,000/sq mi)

English Bay is a neighbourhood in the West End of Vancouver, British Columbia, Canada. Though not formally defined, it is a commonly used local appellation that refers to the shopping and residential areas focused on the intersection of Denman and Davie Streets near at English Bay Beach. Generally, the term refers to the first few blocks of residential areas flanking the beach from Stanley Park to Sunset Beach, and to the commercial areas along Davie Street, and along Denman Street south of Nelson Street.

== Demographics ==
The neighbourhood has a population of 16917 with a population density of 24,310 people per square kilometre (63,000 people/sq mi). The median age is 38.1.
