= List of Hudson's Bay Company trading posts =

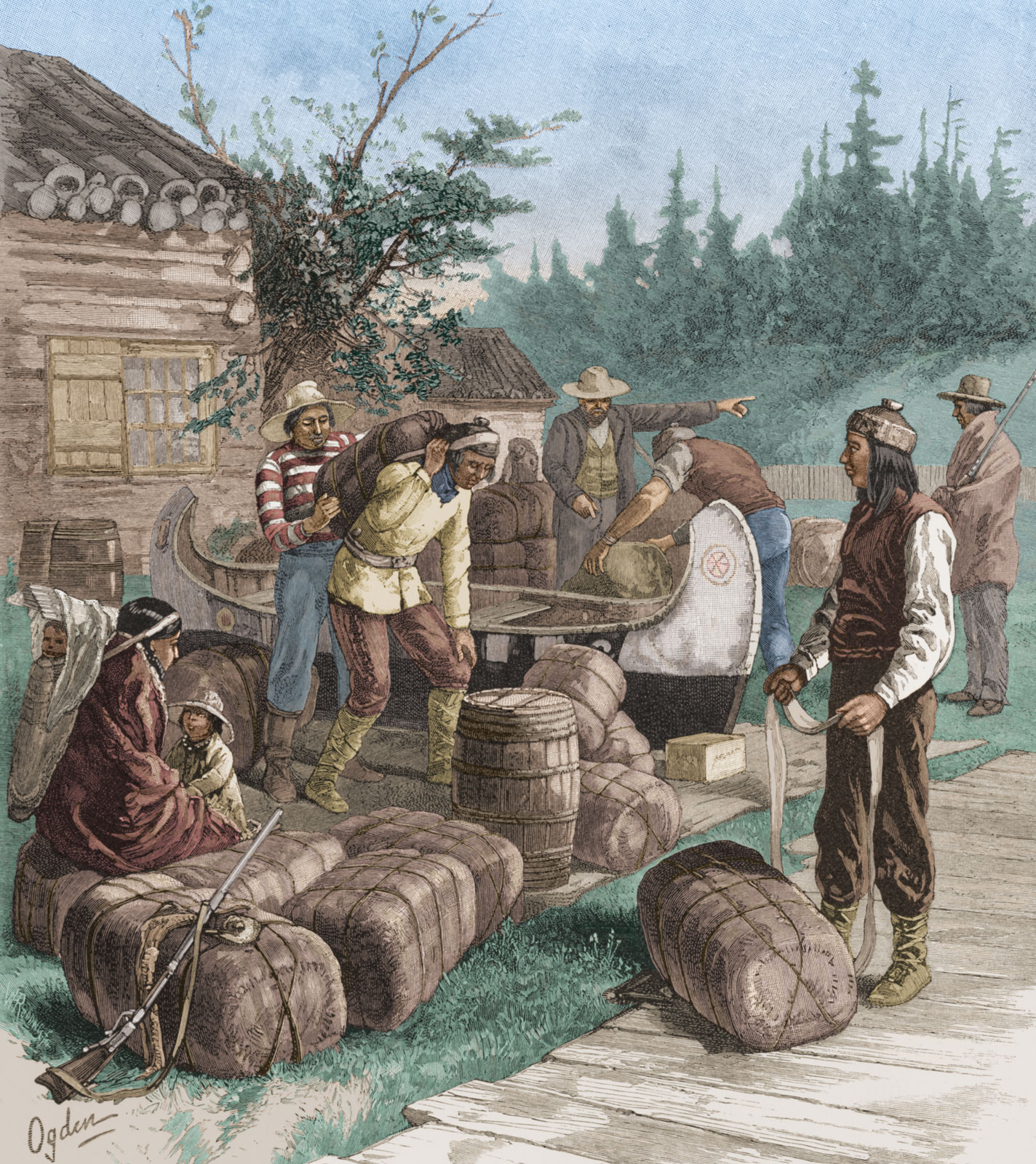
Colorized engraving shows activity at a Hudson's Bay Company trading post, Canada, 1800s.

This is a list of Hudson's Bay Company trading posts.

For the fur trade in general see North American fur trade and Canadian canoe routes (early). For some groups of related posts see Fort-Rupert for James Bay. Ottawa River, Winnipeg River, Assiniboine River fur trade, and Saskatchewan River fur trade.

== A ==
- Lake Abitibi
- Acacoutishendaw (see Flying Post)
- Aillik
- Aklavik
- Fort Albany
- Albany House
- Fort Alexander (see also Sagkeeng First Nation)
- Fort Alexandria
- Allanwater
- Amadjuak
- Fort Anderson (see Anderson River (Northwest Territories))
- Apsley House (see Cross Lake)
- Arctic Bay
- Artiwinipigon (see Eastmain)
- Ash Falls
- Ashuapmuchuan
- Asp House
- Fort Assiniboine
- Lake Assiniboine
- Lake Athabaska
- Athabasca Landing
- Attawapiskat
- Lake Attawapiskat

== B ==
- Babine
- Bad Lake
- Bad Throat Post
- Badger River (see Winisk River)
- Baie-Comeau
- Bernard Harbour
- Baie des Pères (Ville-Marie)
- Baillie Islands
- Baker Lake
- Barkerville
- Bas de la Rivière (see also Fort Alexander)
- Batchewana
- Bathurst Inlet
- Battle River (Notikewin River)
- Battleford
- Bayley's Island (see Albany)
- Bear Lake (Fort Connelly)
- Bearskin Lake
- Beauval
- Beaver Creek (see Fort Ellice)
- Beaver Lake House (see Kitchenuhmaykoosib Inninuwug First Nation)
- Beaver Lake Portage
- Beaver Lodge (see Kitchenuhmaykoosib Inninuwug First Nation)
- Bedford House (Egg Lake) (see Egg Lake (Churchill River))
- Bedford House (Reindeer Lake)
- Bella Bella (see Fort McLoughlin)
- Belcher Islands
- Bellevue Sheep Farm (see San Juan Island)
- Berens River
- Bersimis
- Big Beaver House (see Pipestone River (Kenora District))
- Big Fall (see Little Grand Rapids)
- Big Lake
- Big Point (see Whitemud River)
- Big River (see Chisasibi)
- Bigstone River
- Biscotasing
- Black River
- Blacklead Island
- Blanc-Sablon
- Blood River
- Bolsover House
- Bow Fort
- Bow River (see Chesterfield House)
- Fort Brabant
- Brandon House
- Brunswick House (see Missinaibi River)
- Bucke
- Buckingham
- Buckingham House
- Buffalo River
- Lake Burdingno (see Escabitchewan)
- Lake Burntwood (see Wepiskow Lake)
- Port Burwell

== C ==
- Calgary
- Cambridge Bay
- Candle Lake
- Canoe Lake
- Cape Dorset
- Cape Smith
- Cappoonicagomie (see Kabinakagami Lake)
- Caribou
- Carlton House (Assiniboine)
- Carlton House (Saskatchewan)
- Carlton House (Three Points)
- Cartwright
- Cat Lake
- Cavell
- Cawassieamica
- Cedar Lake
- Chapleau
- Charles Fort (Mackenzie River) (see Fort Good Hope)
- Charlton Island Depot
- Chatham House
- Chats
- Cheasquachiston (Windsor House - NOT Windsor QC)
- Chesterfield House
- Chesterfield Inlet
- Chibougamau
- Chickney
- Chicoutimi
- Fort Chilcotin
- Fort Chimo
- Fort Chipewyan
- Chipewyan Lake
- Chiswick House
- Fort Churchill
- Clapham House (see Reindeer Lake)
- Clear Lake (see Birch Narrows First Nation)
- Clyde River
- Coats Island
- Cold Lake
- Cold Lake (English River)
- Colens Cot (see Norway House)
- Fort Collinson
- Colvile House
- Colvile Landing
- Fort Colvile
- Fort Concord (see Winisk River)
- Fort Connelly, Fort Connolly, or Connolly's Lake (see Bear Lake (Fort Connelly))
- Coocoocache
- Fort à la Corne
- Fort-Coulonge
- Fort Cowlitz (Cowlitz Farm)
- Cree Lake
- Cross Lake
- Cross Portage (see Sipiwesk Lake)
- Cul-de-Sac
- Cumberland House

== D ==
- Dalles
- Fort Dauphin
- Davis Inlet
- Dease Lake
- Deer Lake
- Deloraine
- Desert
- Diana Bay
- Dinorwic
- Dog Head
- Doubtful Post
- Duck Lake
- Duck Lake (Saskatchewan)
- Duck Portage
- Dundas Harbour
- Dunvegan

== E ==
- Eagle Lake
- Eagle Lake (Albany River District)
- Eagle Nest (see Eagle Lake (Ontario))
- Eastmain
- Edmonton (see Fort Edmonton)
- Egg Lake (Churchill River)
- Egg Lake (Swan Lake)
- Fort Ellice
- Ernest House (see Martin Fall and English River)
- Escabitchewan
- Eskimo Point
- Fort Espérance
- Esquimalt
- Esquimaux Bay (see North West River)
- Essex House
- Eyelick (see Aillik)

== F ==
- Factory River
- Fairford
- Fairford House
- Finlay River
- Fisher River
- Fishing Island (see Carlton House (Assiniboine))
- Flamborough House
- Flathead
- Fly Lake
- Flying Post
- Fond-du-Lac
- Fort Frances (see Lac la Pluie)
- Frances Lake
- Fraser Lake
- Frederick House
- Frenchman's Island
- Frobisher Bay (Apex)

== G ==
- Lower Fort Garry
- Upper Fort Garry (see Winnipeg)
- Fort George (Big River)
- Fort George (Columbia River)
- Fort George (New Caledonia)
- George River (see also George River)
- Ghost River
- Gillam
- Gisipigimack
- Glenora
- Gloucester House
- Godbout
- God's Lake
- Gogama
- Fort Good Hope
- Gordon House
- Grady Harbour
- Grand Forks
- Grand-Lac
- Grand Rapid (see Little Grand Rapids)
- Grand Rapids
- Grande Prairie
- Granville House
- Grassy Narrows (MB)
- Grassy Narrows (ON)
- Great Fall (see Little Grand Rapids)
- Great Slave Lake (see Fort Resolution)
- Great Whale River (Kuujjuarapik/Whapmagoostui)
- Green Lake House
- Green Lake (Lake Huron)
- Greenwich House (see Lac La Biche)

== H ==
- Fort Halkett
- Hawaii (see Sandwich Islands)
- Hay River
- Hazelton
- Fort Hall
- Fort Hearne
- Fort Hebron
- Henley House
- Herschel Island
- Honolulu (see Sandwich Islands)
- Fort Hope (Albany)
- Fort Hope (Victoria)
- Hopedale
- Hudson
- Hudson Hope
- Hudson House (Upper & Lower)
- Hulse House
- Hungry Hall

== I ==
- Igloolik
- Île-à-la-Crosse
- Île-Jérémie (Jeremie's Post)
- Indian Elbow (see Fort Pelly)
- Indian Lake
- Island Falls
- Island Falls (Superior/Huron)
- Island House
- Island Lake

== J ==
- Jack River (see Norway House)
- Fort James (see Fort Severn First Nation)
- Jasper House

== K ==
- Kagainagami
- Kaipokok
- Kakabonga (see Rapid Lake, Quebec)
- Kamloops
- Kanaaupscow
- Kaniapiskau
- Kapisko
- Kapusko (see Chickney)
- Keewatin
- Kenogamissi
- Kenora
- Kent Peninsula
- Kibokok (see Kaipokok Bay)
- Kickendatch
- Kittegazuit
- Fort Kilmaurs (see Babine)
- King William Island (Gjoa Haven)
- Knee Lake
- Kuckatush (see Flying Post)
- Kugaryuak

== L ==
- La Cloche
- La Loutre
- La Pierre's House
- La Sarre
- Lac des Allumettes
- Lac des Deux-Montagnes (see Lake of Two Mountains)
- Lac du Bonnet
- Lac du Brochet
- Lac La Biche
- Lac la Pluie
- Lac La Ronge
- Lac Ste. Anne
- Lac Seul
- Lac Travers
- Lachine
- Lake Assiniboine
- Lake Athabasca
- Lake Attawapiskat
- Lake Harbour
- Lake Nipigon (see also Gull Bay First Nation)
- Lake Nipissing
- Lake of Two Mountains
- Lake St. John
- Last Mountain House
- Fort Lampson
- Fort Langley
- Lansdowne House (see Attawapiskat Lake and Neskantaga First Nation)
- Leaf River (Tasiujaq)
- Lesser Slave Lake
- Lethbridge
- Letty Harbour (Paulatuk)
- Liard
- Fort Liard
- Lindsay
- Little Bear Lake
- Little Grand Rapids
- Little Whale River
- Long Lake
- Long Portage
- Loon River
- Lower Fort Garry
- Fort Macleod

== M ==
- Mainwaring River (see Winnipeg Lake)
- Makkovik
- Mamattawa (see Cappoonicagomie)
- Manchester House
- Manitoba House (Doubtful Post)
- Manitoba Lake House (see Whitemud River)
- Manitou
- Mansel Island
- Manuan (Manowan)
- Marlboro House
- Martin Fall
- Masset
- Matachewan
- Matawagamingue
- Mattagami (see Matawagamingue and Michipicoten)
- Mattawa
- Mattice
- McDame Creek
- Fort McKay
- Fort McKenzie
- McLeod Lake
- Fort McLoughlin
- Fort McMurray
- Merry's House
- Mesackamy Lake
- Mesaugamee Lake
- Metabetchuoan (Lac Saint-Jean)
- Point Meuron (see Fort William (Lake Superior))
- Micabanish (see Missinaibi River)
- Michikamau House
- Michipicoten
- Migiskan
- Miminiska Lake
- Minaki
- Mingan
- Mingan Fur Farm
- Missanabie
- Missinaibi (see Missinaibi Lake; see also Missinaibi River)
- Mississagi
- Mistissini
- Mittimatalik (see Pond Inlet)
- Montizambert
- Montreal
- Montreal Lake
- Moose Factory
- Moose Lake
- Moosonee
- Morden
- Muskwaro
- Mutton Bay

== N ==
- Nabisipi
- Nachvak
- Nain
- Fort Nascopie
- Natashkwan
- Nelson House
- Fort Nelson
- Nemiskau
- Neoskweskau
- Nescutia
- New Brunswick House
- New Post
- Fort Nez Percés
- Nichikun
- Nipawin
- Nipigon
- Nipigon House
- Lake Nipigon (see also Gull Bay First Nation)
- Lake Nipissing (at Sturgeon Falls) (see Sturgeon River House Museum
- Nisqually
- Nonala
- Fort Norman
- North West River
- Norway House
- Nottingham House (see Lake Athabasca)
- Nueltin House
- Nutak

== O ==
- Oak Point
- Obijuan
- Ogoki
- Okak
- Onion Lake
- Orillia
- Oskelaneo
- Osnaburgh House
- Oxford House

== P ==
- Padlei (Padley)
- Pagwa River
- Paint Creek House
- Pangnirtung
- Pangnirtung Fox Farm
- Pas Mountain
- Pas Post
- Payne Bay
- Peace River Crossing
- Peel River
- Pekangekum
- Pelican Lake
- Fort Pelly
- Pembina
- Peribonka
- Perry River
- Petaigan River
- Peterbell
- Pic River
- Piegan Post (see Bow Fort)
- Pike Lake
- Pike Lake (Churchill River) (see Portland House)
- Pincher Creek
- Pine Creek
- Pine Lake
- Pine Portage
- Pine Ridge
- Pine River (see Dipper Lake at English River First Nation)
- Fort Pitt
- Point Meuron (see Fort William (Lake Superior))
- Pointe au Foutre (see Fort Alexander)
- Pointe-Bleue
- Pond Inlet
- Poplar Point
- Poplar River
- Port Burwell
- Port Harrison
- Port Harrison Fox Farm
- Portage de l'Île
- Portage La Loche
- Portage la Prairie
- Portland House
- Povungnituk Bay
- Prince Albert
- Fort Prince of Wales (see Fort Churchill)
- Fort Providence
- Pukatawagan

== Q ==
- Qu'Appelle (Assiniboine River) (see Fort Ellice)
- Fort Qu'Appelle
- Quebec
- Quesnel

== R ==
- Fort Rae
- Rampart House
- Rapid River
- Rat Portage
- Read Island (or Reid Island)
- Red Deer River
- Red Lake
- Red River (Athabasca District)
- Red Rock
- Reed Lake
- Reindeer Lake
- Fort Reliance
- Repulse Bay
- Fort Resolution
- Fort Richmond
- Riding Mountain
- Rigolet
- Rock Depot
- Rocky Mountain House
- La Romaine
- Fort Ross
- Rossville
- Fort Rupert
- Rupert House
- Rush Lake

== S ==
- St. Anthony Mines (see Bucke)
- St. Augustine
- Fort St. James
- St. John's Agency
- Fort St. John
- Fort St. Mary
- Saguingue (Saugeen)
- San Francisco
- San Juan Island (Belle Vue Sheep Farm)
- Sandwich Islands
- Sandy Lake
- Sandy Lake (Albany River)
- Sandy Narrows
- Fort Sanspareil (See Edmonton)
- Sault Ste. Marie
- Savanne
- Fort Seaborn
- Fort Selkirk
- Senneterre
- Setting River
- Seven Islands (Sept-Îles)
- Severn
- Shell River (Swan River)
- Shell River (English River)
- Shingle Point
- Shoal Lake
- Shoal River
- Fort Simpson (Mackenzie River)
- Fort Simpson, (Nass) (Lax Kw'alaams)
- Sioux Lookout
- Fort Smith
- Snake Country
- Somerset House (Assiniboine River)
- Somerset House (Turtle Creek)
- Souris River (see Pinehouse, Saskatchewan)
- South Branch House
- South Indian Lake (See Indian Lake)
- South Reindeer Lake
- South River House
- Southampton Island
- Spirit River Ranch
- Split Lake House
- Spokane (Spokane House)
- Stikine
- Stoney Creek (Cumberland)
- Stony Creek
- Stuart Lake (See Fort St. James)
- Stupart's Bay
- Sturgeon Creek
- Sturgeon Lake (Albany River)
- Sturgeon Lake (Peace River)
- Sturgeon River
- Sudbury
- Sugluk East
- Sugluk West
- Swampy Lake
- Swan River House

== T ==
- Tadoussac
- Tavane
- Telegraph Creek (See Glenora)
- Temagami
- Temiskamay
- Teslin Post
- The Pas (See Pas Post)
- Thompson River (See Kamloops)
- Three Rivers
- Thunder Lake
- Timiskaming (Fort Témiscamingue)
- Touchwood Hills Post
- Tree River
- Fort Trial (George River)
- Fort Trial (Labrador Coast)
- Trois-Rivières (See Three Rivers)
- Trout Lake (see Kitchenuhmaykoosib Inninuwug First Nation)
- Trout Lake (Peace River)
- Trout Lake (Timiskaming)
- Turtle Lake

== U ==
- U-Y Outpost

== V ==
- Vancouver
- Fort Vancouver
- Fort Vermilion (Peace River)
- Fort Vermilion (Saskatchewan River)
- Victoria (Alberta)
- Fort Victoria (British Columbia)

== W ==
- Wabowden
- Wager Inlet
- Waswanipi
- Walla Walla (see Fort Nez Percés)
- Waterhen River
- Waterloo, Fort (see Lesser Slave Lake)
- Wedderburn, Fort (see Fort Chipewyan and Lake Athabasca)
- Weenusk
- Wegg's House
- Wepiskow Lake
- West Lynne
- Weymontachingue
- Whale River
- White Dog Post
- White River
- Whitefish Lake (Lake Huron)
- Whitefish Lake (Peace River)
- Whitewood
- Fort William (Lake Superior)
- Fort William (Ottawa River)
- Fort William (Red River)
- Windsor House
- Winisk River
- Winnipeg
- Winnipeg Lake
- Winnipegosis
- Winokapau
- Wire Lake
- Wolstenholme
- Wrangell
- Fort Wrigley

== Y ==
- Yale
- York Factory
- Fort Yukon
- Yerba Buena, California

== See also ==
- Former colonies and territories in Canada
- List of French forts in North America
- List of North American cities by year of foundation
