= Aillik =

Aillik may refer to:

- Aillik, Newfoundland and Labrador, Canada
- Aillik Bay, Newfoundland and Labrador, Canada
