= Asp House =

Minor Hudson's Bay Company post

Asp House was a minor Hudson's Bay Company post on the Rainy River, Canada. It was built at the time when the HBC was pushing inland to regain the trade that had been diverted to Montreal by the North West Company (NWC).

In 1793, John McKay (fur trader) of the Hudson's Bay Company left Fort Albany on James Bay and went south to compete with the North West Company. In September he went up the Rainy River and built a post below Manitou Falls and 12 miles below the NWC post at Fort Lac la Pluie. The post, known as Rivers Mouth, was supplied from Fort Albany but needed supplements from local hunting and fishing. Trade produced only 18 packs of fur.

In 1795, he built a second, more permanent post upstream from the mouth of Rainy River at a meeting place of Athabasca people, since the Indians of Lake of the Woods did not wish to travel upriver. It was called Lower House or Asp House. In October of that year, Charles Boyer came down from Lac la Pluie and built a competing house nearby. Boyer had a difficult time had closed his post the following April. In 1797, McKay's House, as Asp House was then known, was left unoccupied and was subsequently pillaged and burned by rivals from Montreal.

In 1825, the Hudson's Bay Company came back to the Rainy River area when it built Hungry Hall post at the mouth of that river.

== See also ==
- List of Hudson's Bay Company trading posts
