= Fort Douglas (Canada) =

Human settlement in Winnipeg, Manitoba, Canada

Coordinates: 49.90403°N 97.13193°W

- Winnipeg, Manitoba
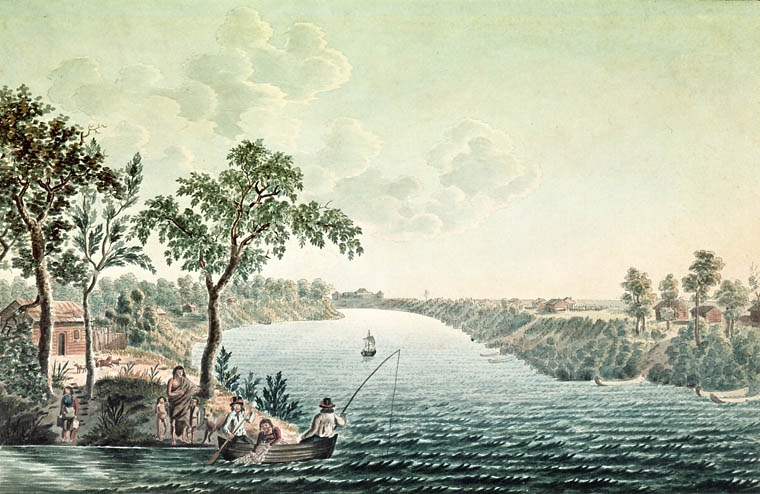
- Red River summer view in 1822 with Fort Douglas in the background by Peter Rindisbacher

Site information
- Type: Fort
- Controlled by: Thomas Douglas, 5th Earl of Selkirk, Hudson's Bay Company

Site history
- Built: 1813-1815
- In use: 1814-1826
- Battles/wars: Pemmican War; Battle of Seven Oaks

National Historic Site of Canada
- Official name: Forts Rouge, Garry, and Gibraltar National Historic Site of Canada
- Designated: 1924

Fort Douglas was the Selkirk Settlement (Red River Colony) fort and the first fort associated with the Hudson's Bay Company near the confluence of the Red and Assiniboine rivers in today's city of Winnipeg.

Named for Thomas Douglas, 5th Earl of Selkirk, founder of the Selkirk Settlement, the fort was in the immediate vicinity (down river) of the rivaling North West Company's Fort Gibraltar.

== History ==
Named for Thomas Douglas, 5th Earl of Selkirk, founder of the Selkirk Settlement, the fort was built by Scottish and Irish settlers beginning in 1813. Completed in 1815, it was in the immediate vicinity (down river) of the North West Company establishment, Fort Gibraltar.

After the Battle of Seven Oaks in 1816, during the conflict between the Hudson's Bay Company and the North West Company, the fort was captured by the Métis and employees of the North West Company. The fort was soon retaken by Selkirk's men and there was a short period of relative peace. Thomas Douglas, 5th Earl of Selkirk lived at the fort during his visit to the Selkirk Settlement (Red River Colony) in the summer of 1817. It was later used as a trading post and was the residence of the Governor of Assiniboia. Following the amalgamation of the Hudson's Bay Company (HBC) and the North West Company (NWC) in 1821, the HBC's operations were relocated to the NWC's Fort Gibraltar, renamed Fort Garry. Fort Douglas remained the residence of the Governor of Assiniboia until it was mostly destroyed in the great Red River flood of 1826. A second flood in 1852 swept away remnants.

== Legacy ==
Today, the site of Fort Douglas is located on Waterfront Drive in downtown Winnipeg, in Fort Douglas Park. As the heart of the Selkirk Settlement and the first significant structure in what is today Winnipeg's historic Exchange District, the site of the fort is the most important historical site in the district. The eminent Canadian historian Professor Chester Martin of the University of Manitoba, in 1924 described the site of Fort Douglas as "perhaps the most historic site in the prairie provinces."
