= Fort Gibraltar =

Historic trading outpost in present-day Manitoba, Canada

Coordinates: 49.8871°N 97.1294°W

- Winnipeg, Manitoba
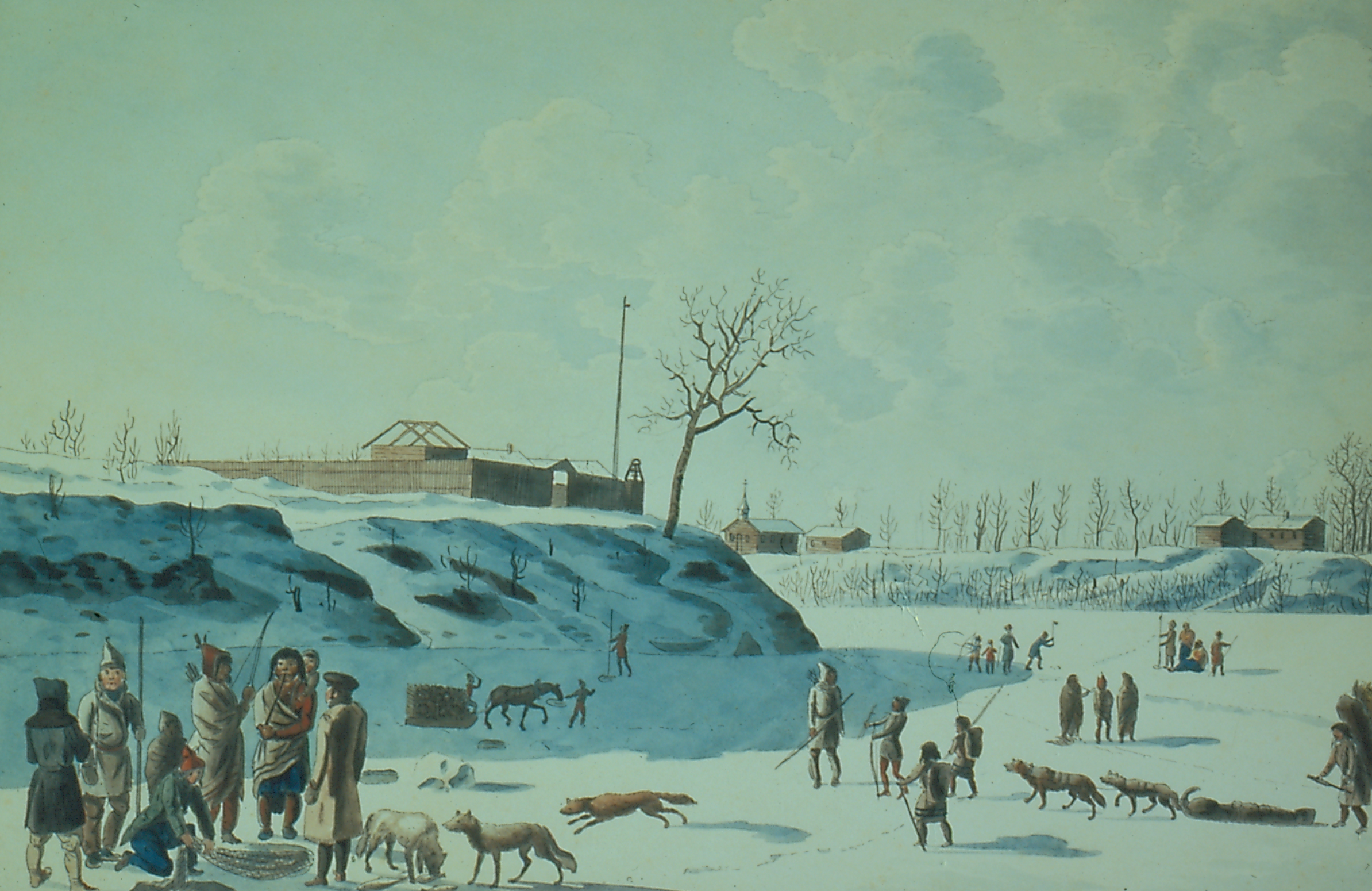
- The fort at the confluence of the Red and Assiniboine rivers in 1821 by Peter Rindisbacher

Site information
- Type: Fort
- Controlled by: North West Company

Site history
- Built: 1809
- In use: 1809-1821
- Battles/wars: Pemmican War; Battle of Seven Oaks

National Historic Site of Canada
- Official name: Forts Rouge, Garry, and Gibraltar National Historic Site of Canada
- Designated: 1924
- Public transit: Winnipeg Transit; 888

Fort Gibraltar was founded in 1809 by Alexander Macdonell of Greenfield of the North West Company in present-day Manitoba, Canada. It was located at the confluence of the Red and Assiniboine rivers in or near the area now known as The Forks in the city of Winnipeg. Fort Gibraltar was renamed Fort Garry after the merger of North West Company and the Hudson's Bay Company in 1821, and became Upper Fort Garry in 1835.

== Early history ==
Fort Gibraltar was established by the North West Company in 1809 at the confluence of the Red and Assiniboine rivers, in what is now The Forks in Winnipeg. For thousands of years before the arrival of Europeans, the site had been an important gathering place for Indigenous peoples because it connected major waterways used for travel, trade and communication.

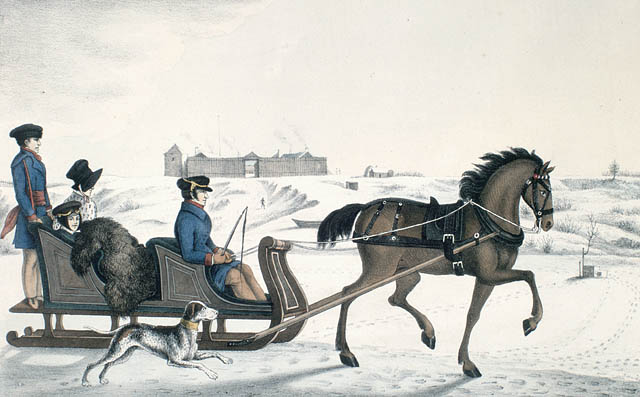
Governor of Red River Andrew Bulger driving his family in a horse-drawn cariole on the frozen Red River, with Fort Garry in the background, winter 1822–23

By the early 19th century, The Forks lay on major canoe routes used by the North West Company. To strengthen its position in the Red River region during its rivalry with the Hudson's Bay Company, the company established a permanent trading post at the site in 1809.

According to North West Company partner John McDonald of Garth, the post was named Gibraltar after the Rock of Gibraltar. Construction began under the direction of Alexander Macdonell of Greenfield.

Over the following decade, Fort Gibraltar became an important North West Company post in the Red River region before being drawn into the conflict that became known as the Pemmican War.

== History ==
In the early 19th century, fur-trading was the main industry of Western Canada. Two companies had an intense competition over the trade. The first, the Hudson's Bay Company, was a London, England-based organization. The second, the North West Company, was based in Montreal. Hudson's Bay Company was distinctly English in its culture and flavour while the North West Company was a mix of French, Scottish and First Nations cultures.

The voyageurs of the North West Company were a highly mobile group of fur traders. They established temporary encampments in the forks region that later became Winnipeg.

In 1809, the North West Company built Fort Gibraltar. About half a mile north the Selkirk settlers and HBC employees built Fort Douglas which was started in 1813 and completed in 1815. There were many conflicts between the mostly Scottish employees of the HBC and the NWC employees, who were mostly French-Canadians and Métis.(see Pemmican War)

On March 17, 1816, Fort Gibraltar was captured and destroyed by Robert Semple, new Governor of the Red River Colony. The action was ruled illegal by British authorities and the North West Company was given permission to rebuild the fort in 1817.

On March 26, 1821, the North West Company was merged with its rival under the name of the Hudson's Bay Company.

=== Chronology of Fort Gibraltar ===
- 1809: The North West Company builds Fort Gibraltar.
- 1816: Fort Gibraltar is captured and destroyed by forces from the Red River Colony led by Governor Robert Semple during the Pemmican War.
- 1817: The North West Company rebuilds Fort Gibraltar.
- 1821: The North West Company merges with the Hudson's Bay Company.
- 1822: Fort Gibraltar is renamed Fort Garry.
- 1835: Following destruction in the 1826 Red River flood, Fort Garry is rebuilt as Upper Fort Garry.

== Fort Gibraltar Museum ==
A reconstructed Fort Gibraltar located in Parc Whittier Park in St. Boniface, Winnipeg was built in the late 1970s for the Festival du Voyageur, the largest winter festival in Western Canada. In the summer, the museum operates living history demonstrations of life in the fur trading post as in 1815. Fort Gibraltar is currently located in Parc Whittier Park at 866 rue St Joseph Street. It is the location of an annual winter Festival du Voyageur as well as events hosted by Fort Catering.

== Recognition ==
The site of the fort was designated a National Historic Site in 1924 as part of the "Forts Rouge, Garry, and Gibraltar National Historic Site of Canada".

== See also ==
- Fort Garry
- Upper Fort Garry
- Lower Fort Garry
- North West Company
- Hudson's Bay Company
- Fur trade
- Pemmican War
- Battle of Seven Oaks
- Red River Colony
- Red River Settlement
- The Forks, Winnipeg
- St. Boniface, Winnipeg
