= Hungry Hall =

Two unrelated Canadian trading posts

Hungry Hall was the name of two unrelated Canadian trading posts.

1. Saskatchewan River (NWC, 1791): In 1790, William Thorburn of the North West Company built a post on the right bank of the Saskatchewan River near Nipawin, Saskatchewan to cut off the Hudson's Bay Company trade at Cumberland House, Saskatchewan. Next year, he moved downriver and built a post on the left bank of the river opposite Petaigan Creek. It was called Hungry Hall because of its poor returns. Malcomb Ross was sent up from Cumberland House to build a competing post beside him. It seems to have been closed in 1794. Today the site is probably under Tobin Lake. A version of Thorburn's name was given to Tobin Rapid. The name may have been transferred to the Lake.
2. Rainy River (HBC, 1825): In 1825 (or 1830s) the Hudson's Bay Company built Hungry Hall near the mouth of the Rainy River, downstream from the former Asp House. Several times the men of the post came near to starvation, which likely gave the post its name. In 1834, it was abandoned by agreement with the American Fur Company. In 1863, it reappears in the records as an outpost. In 1870, the post was renamed Fort Louisa (or Fort Louise), although the name Hungry Hall was still used. Between 1885 and 1889, it served as an outpost for Rat Portage. It was closed in 1893, suffering losses due to American competition. The site is at the current Oak Grove Resort where a historical marker has been installed on the riverbank. Its name was borrowed by a band of the Rainy River First Nations.

== See also ==
- List of Hudson's Bay Company trading posts
