= Aillik Bay =

- Location within Newfoundland and Labrador
- Location: Newfoundland and Labrador, Canada
- Coordinates: 55°11′55″N 59°12′30″W
- Type: Bay
- Part of: Labrador Sea
- Max. length: 8.0 km (5 mi)
- Max. depth: 34.5 m (113 ft)
- Frozen: mid November to June

Aillik Bay (formerly Ailik Bay) is a bay on the coast of Labrador in the province of Newfoundland and Labrador, Canada. The ghost town of Aillik is located on the western shore of the bay.

The area around the bay is notable for the widely distributed lamprophyric dykes.

== Geography ==
Aillik Bay is formed by a narrow peninsula projecting northward from the mainland, separating it from the entrance to Kaipokok Bay to the west, while Makkovik Bay is to the east. Cape Aillik, on the northern extremity of an islet, marks the western entrance point of Aillik Bay. The western shore of the bay is steep, with Summer Cove about 1.6 kilometres (1 mi) south of Cape Aillik. The eastern shore of the bay is bordered by boulders.

The eastern entrance point for the bay is Cape Makkovik, which is a steep bluff rising to round summits connected with the inland mountain ranges. The cape's summit was formerly the location of Cape Makkovik Air Station, part of the Pinetree Line.

Aillik Bay provides one of the easiest anchorage places along this part of the Labrador coast.

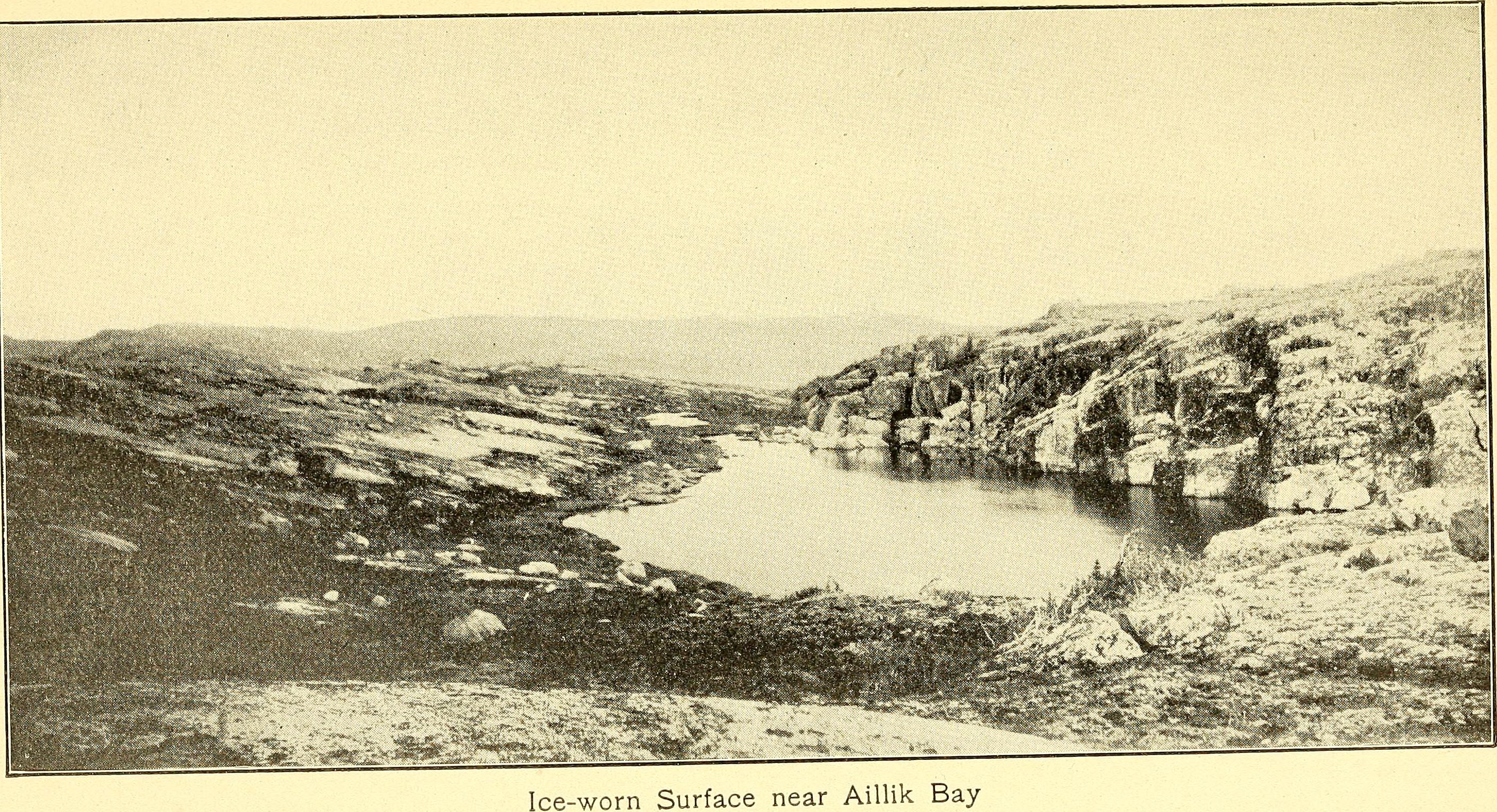
Ice-worn surface near Aillik Bay
