= Savanne, Ontario =

Savanne
- dispersed rural community unincorporated area
- Location in Ontario
- Coordinates: 48°57′6″N 90°14′45″W
- Country: Canada
- Province: Ontario
- District: Thunder Bay
- Geographic township: Savanne
- Time zone: UTC-5 (Eastern Time Zone)
  - Summer (DST): UTC-4 (Eastern Time Zone)
- Postal Code: P0T
- Area code: 807

Savanne is a dispersed rural community and unincorporated area in geographic Savanne Township in the Unorganized Part of Thunder Bay District in Northwestern Ontario, Canada. The community was historically the location of a Hudson's Bay Company trading post.

== Geography ==
The community lies at the junction of the Savanne and Little Savanne Rivers, just east of Lac des Mille Lacs. It is located along Ontario Highway 17, approximately 22 kilometres east of Upsala, and 156 kilometres west of Thunder Bay.
