= Flying Post =

Historic trading post in Ontario, Canada

Flying Post was a Hudson's Bay Company trading post located on the Kukatush (variously spelled Kuckatoosh or Ahkuckootish) or Groundhog River, a tributary of the Mattagami River. The post was approximately eighty miles downriver from Kukatush or Groundhog Lake, and one hundred miles upriver from the river's junction with the Mattagami. It was approximately fifty miles northwest of Matawagamingue. The post was built by fur trader Donald McKay in 1800.

== First Nation ==
Flying Post First Nation has a registered population of 250, all living off reserve. The current chief is Ray Murray. The band office is located in Nipigon, Ontario but the reserve is on the kukutush river between Foleyet and Timmins with many members still living in the area. The band has a 5,957.1-hectare (14,720-acre) reserve (48°31′52″N 82°1′1″W), Flying Post No. 73, located 40 kilometres (25 mi) southwest of Smooth Rock Falls, Ontario. The band is a signatory of Treaty 9 (July 16, 1906).
