= Frenchmans Island, Newfoundland and Labrador =

Locality in Newfoundland and Labrador, Canada

Coordinates: 53.211°N 55.732°W

Location of Frenchman's Island in Newfoundland and Labrador

Frenchmans Island is a locality in the Canadian province of Newfoundland and Labrador.
