= Kaipokok Bay =

Bay in Canada

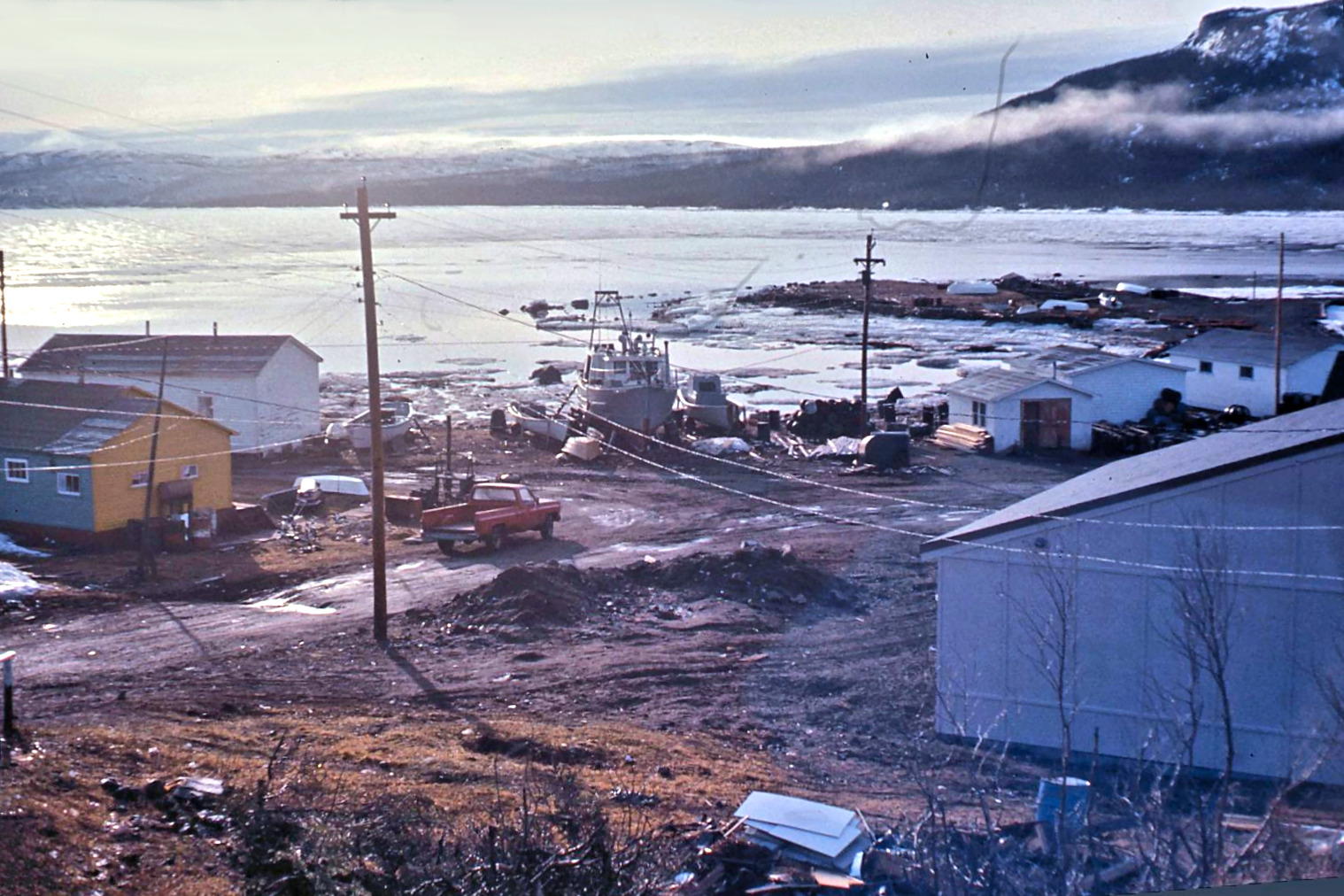
- Kaipokok Bay at Postville, 1977

- Location within Newfoundland and Labrador
- Location: Labrador
- Coordinates: 55°00′N 59°35′W
- Type: Inlet
- Part of: Labrador Sea
- Primary inflows: Kaipokok River
- Basin countries: Canada
- Max. length: 56 km (35 mi)
- Average depth: 37 to 73 m (120 to 240 ft)

Kaipokok Bay is a bay in Labrador, Canada, that extends for 56 kilometres (35 mi) inland from the northern Atlantic Ocean. The bay is sparsely populated, with Postville being the only permanent settlement. Several trading posts existed along the bay until the 1950s. This includes the former settlement of Kaipokok, where the Hudson's Bay Company (HBC) operated a trading post from 1837 to 1880.

== Geography ==
Kaipokok Bay is located southwest from Cape Aillik, which separates it from Aillik Bay to the east. Cape Roy, on the end of a narrow promontory off the 273-metre (895 ft) high Kaipokok Hill, is its western entrance point of the bay. In the middle of the entrance to the bay is Long Island, that restricts the width of the bay at this point to about 1.6 kilometres (1 mi).

The bay extends southwestward for 56 kilometres (35 mi). Its bottom is mud, with general depths of 37 to 73 metres (120 to 240 ft) in the main channel. Its head is shallower, where depths decrease to between 15 and 18 metres (48 and 60 ft). The bay is fed by several large fresh-water streams and rivers from interior lakes.

The Sisters, a group of islets, are in the middle of the bay, and about 4.0 kilometres (2.5 mi) further south is English River Island. The Turnavik Islands are lying just outside the entrance to Kaipokok Bay.

== History ==
Kaipokok Bay was a historic Innu route between the coast and Labrador's interior. Taking advantage of this route, Pierre Marcoux, a French-Canadian also called Makko, set up a post on the bay in 1792. Besides trading, he preached to the Innu, but by the early 1800s, he had left the area.

In 1837, the HBC purchased a property located 53 kilometres (33 mi) from the head of the bay at Kibokok (also called Kaipokok, Kebokok, or Kipoitk). It ran a trading post, salmon fishery, and in the spring a seal fishery. Since the fur trade was slow, they operated an outpost at Tigaraxhook, about 72 kilometres (45 mi) to the north, in the summer of 1838 (and again from 1843 to 1845).

HBC closed the post at Kibokok in 1880, and moved operations to Ailik.

By 1884, there were about 24 people living in homesteads scattered around the bay; this increased to 40 by 1921. Starting in the 1940s, the population around the bay began to concentrate in Postville, which was the only permanent settlement on the bay by the early 1950s.

== See also ==
- Geology of Newfoundland and Labrador
