= Rural Municipality of Shell Lake No. 495 =

Former rural municipality in Saskatchewan, Canada

Shell Lake No. 495
- Rural municipality
- Location within Saskatchewan
- Coordinates: 53.270°N 107.158°W
- Country: Canada
- Province: Saskatchewan

The Rural Municipality of Shell Lake No. 495 was a rural municipality (RM) in the Canadian province of Saskatchewan. It was originally formed as the RM of Shell River No. 495 before changing its name to the RM of Shell Lake No. 495 on November 30, 1935. Shell Lake No. 495 was dissolved on December 31, 1953. It was absorbed by the RM of Spiritwood No. 496. It originally comprised nine townships.
