= Aillik, Newfoundland and Labrador =

Aillik
- Unincorporated community
- Location of Aillik in Newfoundland and Labrador
- Coordinates: 55°12′46″N 59°12′26″W
- Country: Canada
- Province: Newfoundland and Labrador
- Census division: Div. 11, Subd. C
- Time zone: UTC-4 (Atlantic Time)
  - Summer (DST): UTC-3 (Atlantic Daylight Time)
- Area code: 709

Historical populations
| Year | Pop. |
|---|---|
| 1921 | 15 |
| 1935 | 18 |
| 1945 | 16 |
Source: Census of Newfoundland and Labrador

Aillik (/ˈaɪlɪk/ EYE-lik, archaic: Ailik) was a fishing and trading settlement located north of Makkovik, Labrador, Canada. The community is named after the bay on which it is located. Aillik is an Inuit term meaning "a place having sleeves", so named because Aillik Bay is shaped with two branches at its head. The Ailik Islands also take their name from the bay.

== History ==
Archeological finds at Aillik indicate that the site was seasonally occupied by the Inuit, possibly as early as 1500 CE.

A Hudson's Bay Company trading post, also known as Eyelick or Eyeleck, was established in around 1838, with George Mackenzie as factor. The post was used for seal hunting, salmon fishing, and trading, but was abandoned in 1840-1841 due to poor returns. It reopened in 1855, operating seasonally until it closed for good sometime between 1875 and 1878.

The location continued to be used as a summer settlement for cod and seal fishermen who came from nearby Kaipokok Bay. In 1921, it had a population of 15, seven fishing boats, and one sailing vessel of 50 tons. It grew in importance in the 1930s, with a trading post ran by a family of independent traders. In 1938, a church was built by Pentecostal pastor William Gillette, who moved to Postville a few years later.

In 1945, it had a population of 16, and had regular boat service to other Labrador and Newfoundland ports at that time. In 1949, Gillette opened a store in Postville, which would serve Aillik from then on. The first postmaster (established July 2, 1952) was William John Pilgrim.

== See also ==
- List of communities in Newfoundland and Labrador
- List of ghost towns in Newfoundland and Labrador
