= Fort Lac la Pluie =

Fur trade depot

Fort Lac la Pluie was a fur trade depot established by the North West Company sometime between 1775 and 1787. It was located on a high bank on the west side of modern Fort Frances, Ontario across from International Falls, Minnesota on the Rainy River downstream (west) of some rapids (Chaudière portage) where the river flows out of Rainy Lake. Upstream at the outlet of the lake was the old French post of Fort Saint Pierre (1731–1758). The site is marked by a granite boulder. Morton describes some runnable rapids, Fort Saint Pierre and a fall that had to be portaged before reaching the fort, which implies that the river level may have changed.

The place was a depot rather than a trading post and served two purposes. By this time the trade had reached the rich Lake Athabasca country which was too far to reach from Montreal in one season. Each May, when the ice broke up, boats with trade goods would head west from Montreal and winterers with canoe-loads of fur would head east. They would meet at Grand Portage on Lake Superior, exchange goods and head back before the freeze-up. To further save time goods and furs would be shuttled between Grand Portage and Lac la Pluie. Second, it was a source of food. The voyageurs had no time to hunt and it was difficult to haul food from Montreal. Rainy Lake produced wild rice and fish. The fort also built kegs and canoes.

With the growth of pemmican production around Lake Winnipeg its importance as a food source diminished. It declined further when the two companies merged and trade shifted from Montreal to Hudson Bay. In 1792 two men were killed while out fishing. Around 1795 John McKay (fur trader) of the Hudson's Bay Company had a rival post nearby. With the merger of the two firms in 1821 it was taken over by the Hudson's Bay Company. In 1830 it was named Fort Frances in honor of Governor Simpson's new wife. Its date of closure is uncertain.

== See also ==
- For the trade route in general see Winnipeg River.
