= Hargreaves =

Hargreaves is a surname, and may refer to:

- Aaron Hargreaves (born 1986), Canadian football player
- Adam Hargreaves (born 1963), British author of children's books and son of Roger Hargreaves
- Alberto Hargreaves (born 1929), Portuguese architect and urbanist
- Alice Hargreaves, née Liddell (1852–1934), inspiration for the well known book, Alice in Wonderland
- Alison Hargreaves (1962–1995), British mountain climber
- Alistair Hargreaves (born 1986), South African rugby union player
- Amy Hargreaves (born 1970), American actress
- Andrew Raikes Hargreaves (born 1955), British politician
- Andy Hargreaves (academic) (born 1951), English academic
- Andy Hargreaves (musician), English rock drummer
- Anne Hargreaves (1870–1923), English-born missionary teacher in Philippines
- Brad Hargreaves (born 1971), American drummer
- Bryn Hargreaves (born 1985), English rugby league player
- Cain C. Hargreaves from Earl Cain
- Charlie Hargreaves (1896–1979), American basketball player
- Chris Hargreaves (born 1971), English footballer
- Christine Hargreaves (1939–1984), English actress
- David Hargreaves (born 1939), British education administrator
- Frances Hargreaves (1955–2017), South African actress
- Fred Hargreaves (1884–1960), English footballer
- Frederick James Hargreaves (1891–1970), British astronomer
- George Hargreaves (born 1952), American landscape designer
- George Hargreaves (politician) (born 1957), British religious minister, politician, record producer and songwriter
- Harold Hargreaves (1876–?), British Indian archaeologist
- Harry Hargreaves (footballer) (1889–1975), English footballer
- Harry Hargreaves (cartoonist) (1922–2004), English cartoonist
- Herbert Hargreaves (1912–1990), English cricketer
- Ian Hargreaves (born 1951), British journalist
- Jack Hargreaves (1911–1994), British author and television presenter and brother of Ronald Hargreaves
- James Hargreaves (1720–1778), English weaver and inventor
- James Hargreaves (chemist) (1834–1915), English chemist and inventor
- James Hargreaves (English cricketer) (1859–1922), American born English cricketer
- James Hargreaves (New Zealand cricketer) (1868–1924), New Zealand cricketer
- Jared Waerea-Hargreaves (born 1989), Australian rugby league player
- Jim Hargreaves (1950–2020), former Canadian ice hockey player
- Joe Hargreaves (footballer, fl. 1912–1924), English footballer for Bradford City
- Joe Hargreaves (footballer, born 1915) (1915–1992), English football forward for Rossendale United, Rochdale and Stalybridge Celtic
- Johanna Hargreaves (born 1963), British television actress
- John Hargreaves (disambiguation), several people
- Josh Hargreaves (1870–1954), English footballer
- June Hargreaves (born 1937), British town planner and conservationist
- Ken Hargreaves (1939–2012), British politician
- Kenneth Hargreaves (1903–1990), British soldier and industrialist
- Linda Hargreaves, British actress
- Owen Hargreaves (born 1981), Canadian-born English professional footballer
- Peter Hargreaves (born 1946), British business man, founder of Hargreaves Lansdown
- Reginald Hargreaves (1852–1926), English cricketer
- Roger Hargreaves (1935–1988), British author of children's books (Mr Men) and father of Adam Hargreaves
- Ronald Hargreaves (1908–1962), British psychiatrist and brother of Jack Hargreaves
- Ted Hargreaves (1943–2005), Canadian ice hockey player
- Vernon Hargreaves III (born 1995), American football player

== See also ==
- Hargreave (surname)
- Hargrave (surname)
