= Hargrave (surname) =

Hargrave is an English surname that may refer to:

- Bert Hargrave (1917–1996), Canadian politician
- Bob Hargrave (1920–2014), former American footballer
- Bubbles Hargrave (1892–1969), American baseball player
- Christopher Hargrave (born 1951), Australian cricketer
- David A. Hargrave (1946–1986), American game designer and writer
- Francis Hargrave (c. 1741–1821), English lawyer and antiquary
- John Hargrave (jurist) (1815–1885), Australian politician, jurist
- Javon Hargrave (born 1993), American footballer
- John Hargrave (1894–1982) or White Fox, British youth leader and politician
- Joseph James Hargrave (1841–1894), Canadian trader, author, and journalist
- Lawrence Hargrave (1850–1915), Australian aviation pioneer
- Letitia MacTavish Hargrave (1813–1854), Scottish writer
- Margaret Packham Hargrave (born 1941), Australian writer
- Paul Hargrave (1938–2025), American biochemist
- Pinky Hargrave (1896–1942), American baseball player
- Richard Hargrave (1817–1905), Australian politician
- Rudolph Hargrave (1925–2014), American jurist
- Ryan Hargrave (born 1981), Australian rules footballer
- William Hargrave, multiple people

== See also ==
- Hargrave (disambiguation)
- Hargraves
- Hargreave (surname)
- Hargreaves (surname)
