= Hargrave =

Hargrave may refer to:

== People ==
- Hargrave (surname)

== Places ==
- Hargrave, Manitoba, Canada
- Hargrave, Cheshire, England
- Hargrave, Northamptonshire, England
- Hargrave, Suffolk, England
- Hargrave, Kansas, United States

== Other uses ==
- 11777 Hargrave, a Main-belt asteroid
- Hargrave Military Academy, Chatham, Virginia, United States
- Hargrave River (disambiguation), several rivers

== See also ==
- Hargraves
- Hargreave (surname)
- Hargreaves (surname)
