= Southbranch Settlement =

Coordinates: 52°50′00″N 106°05′02″W

The District of Saskatchewan in 1885 (within the black diamonds) included the central section of Saskatchewan and extended into Alberta and Manitoba.
The Southbranch Settlements are circled in black.

Southbranch Settlement (French: Communautés métisses de la rivière Saskatchewan Sud) was the name ascribed to a series of French Métis settlements on the Canadian prairies in the 19th century, in what is today the province of Saskatchewan. Métis settlers began making homes here in the 1860s and 1870s, many of them fleeing economic and social dislocation from Red River, Manitoba. The settlements became the centre of Métis resistance during the North-West Resistance when in March 1885, Louis Riel, Gabriel Dumont, Honoré Jackson, and others set up the Provisional Government of Saskatchewan with their headquarters at Batoche.

== History ==
The Settlements stretched along both sides of the South Saskatchewan River in river lot style from Fish Creek north through Batoche and St. Laurent to St. Louis which was its northern boundary. They included Duck Lake 12 kilometers from St. Laurent accessed by the St. Laurent Ferry. The distance from Fish Creek to St. Louis was less than 50 kilometres. They were proximal to several Cree reserves, as well as Anglo-Metis settlements to the north around Prince Albert.

Batoche and St. Laurent de Grandin were founded by French Métis hivernants from the Red River settlement. Hivernants were hunters and trappers who spent the winter on the prairies and returned to the Red River settlement in the spring with their winter catch.

Gabriel Dumont was the leader of the buffalo hunt for his group of 200 hunters living in the Southbranch settlements from 1863 to the end of the Métis buffalo hunts in about 1875. In 1873 the Southbranch settlements organized a form of local government, under Gabriel Dumont, based on the laws of the buffalo hunt.

In the 1880s the population of the Southbranch settlements may have been as high as 1300 with 40 to 60 families living in each of the four largest communities.

The North-West Resistance of 1885 was a traumatic event for all the Southbranch communities, and they had passed their prime by the 1890s when the railway brought in increasing numbers of new immigrant settlers. Some of the settlements, such as St. Louis still remain however.

=== Missions ===
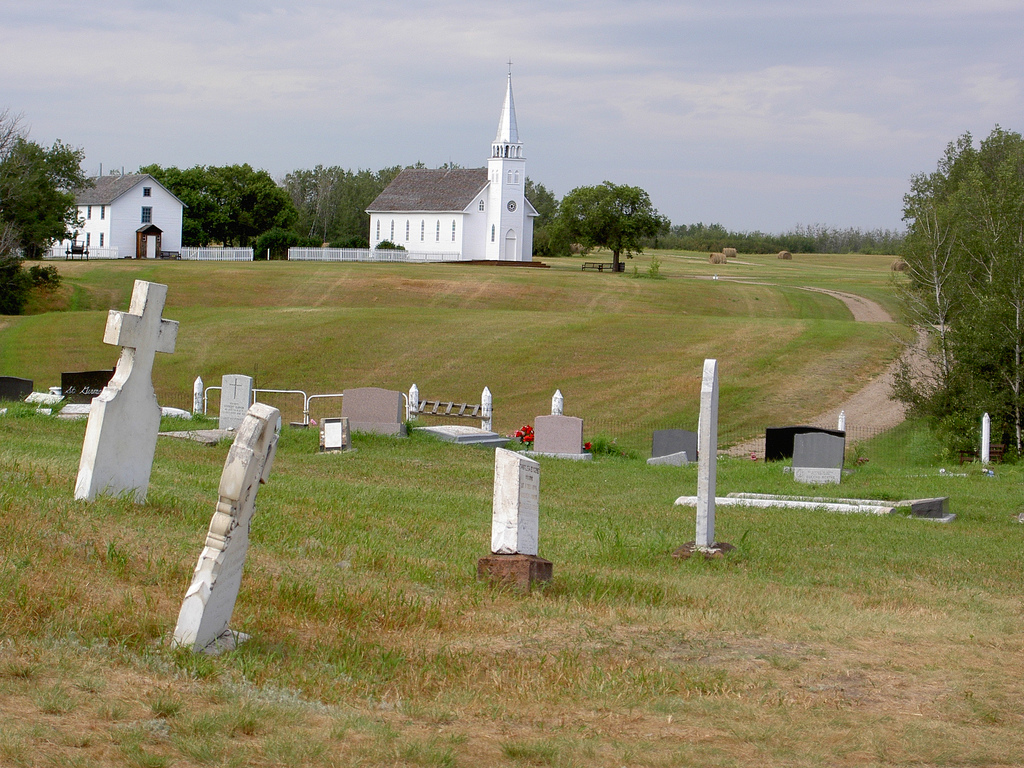
Church, rectory and cemetery of Saint Antoine de Padoue in Batoche

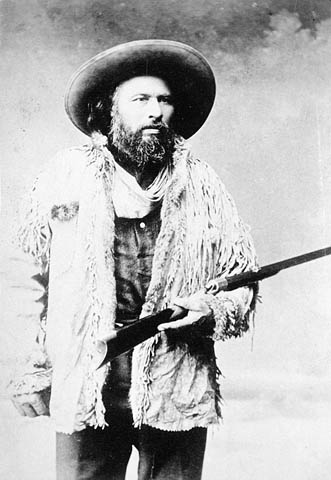
Gabriel Dumont (1837–1906)

Missionary Oblates of Mary Immaculate established missions in the settlements during the 1870s and 1880s.

- St. Laurent, the oldest of the settlements, was originally the wintering home of Métis plains buffalo hunters. A mission was established in 1873 by Father Andre o.m.i..
- Duck Lake Mission (St. Sacrement) was also established by Father Andre o.m.i. in 1874.
- Batoche Mission (St. Antoine) was established in 1882 by Father Vegreville o.m.i..
- St. Louis de Langevin Mission was established in 1886 by Father Lecoque o.m.i.
- Fish Creek Mission was also established by Father Lecoque o.m.i..

By 1888 all the Missions except Fish Creek had schools. St. Laurent had a post office, a telegraph office and a store. Duck Lake had a post office (called Stobart) a flour mill and a trading post. Batoche had three stores, a post office and a saloon. St. Louis had a store (at McDougall's crossing) and a post office (called Boucher).

== See also ==
- District of Saskatchewan
- Battle of Duck Lake
- Battle of Fish Creek
- Battle of Batoche
