= Métis buffalo hunting =

Hunting activity in North America

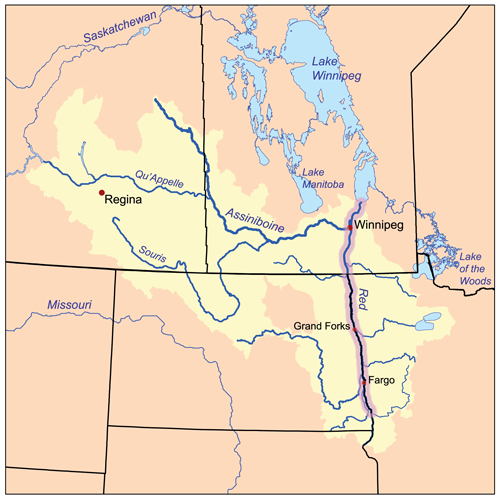
The summer hunting range was west of the Red River of the North in the Sioux territory of the Dakotas

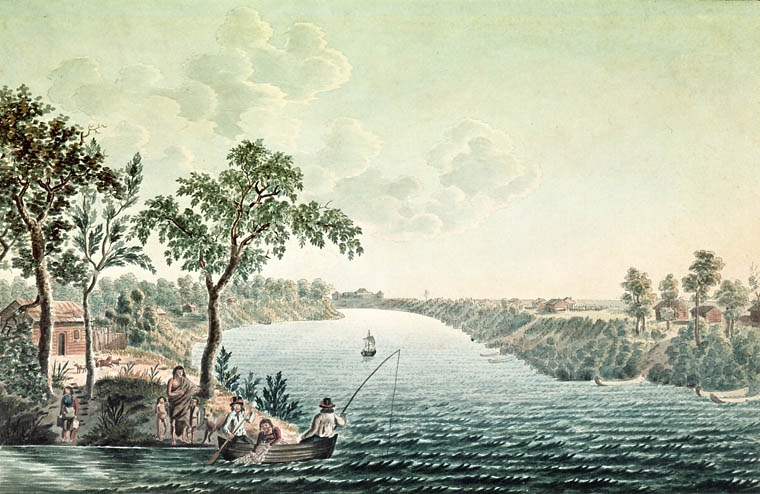
Homes on narrow river lots along the Red River near St. Boniface in July, 1822 by Peter Rindisbacher

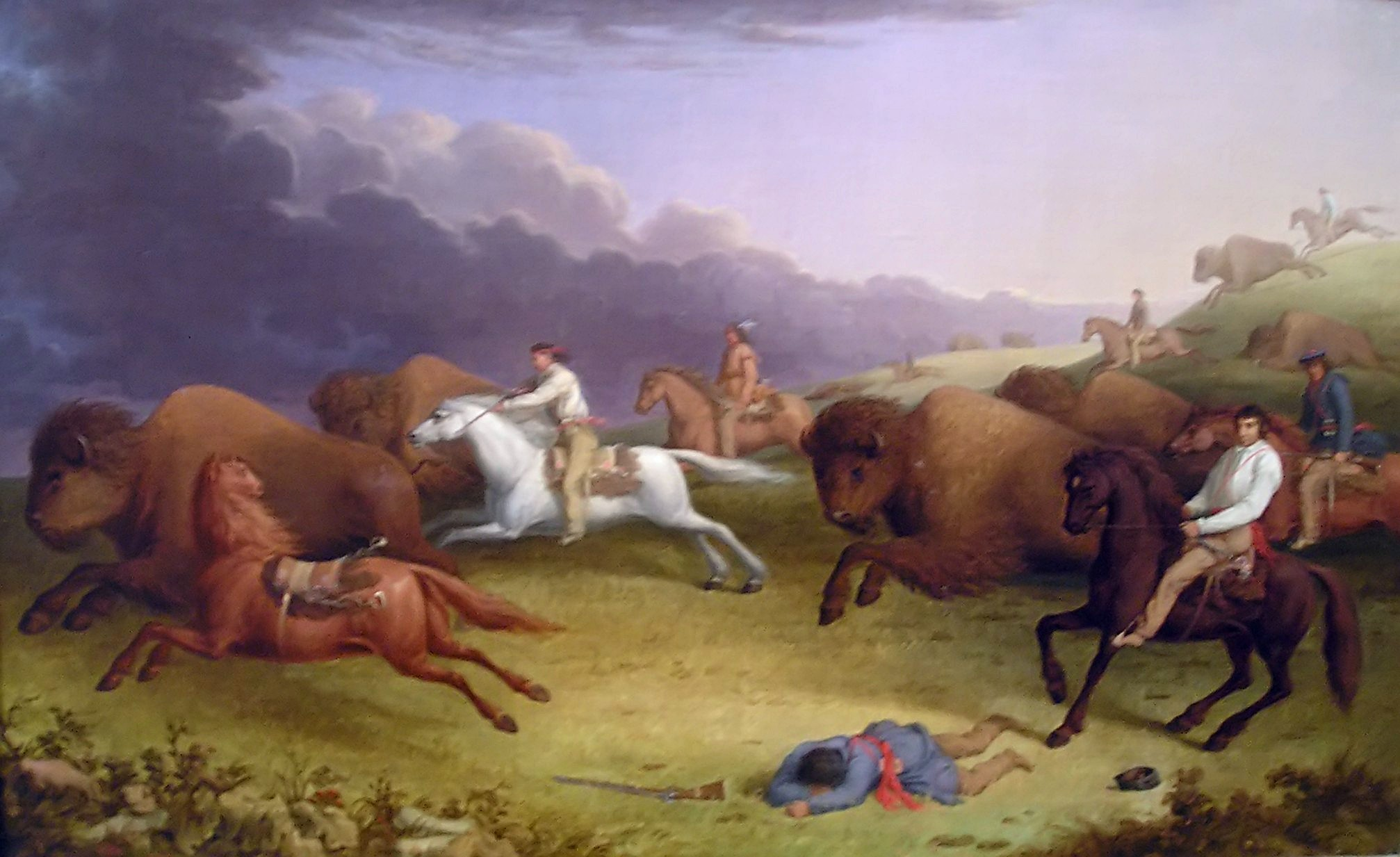
Paul Kane witnessed and participated in the annual Métis buffalo hunt in June 1846 on the prairies in Dakota.

Métis buffalo hunting began on the North American plains in the late 1700s and continued until 1878. The great buffalo hunts were subsistence, political, economic, and military operations for Métis families and communities living in the region. At the height of the buffalo hunt era, there were two major hunt seasons: summer and autumn. These hunts were highly organized, with an elected council to lead the expedition. This made sure the process was fair and all families were well-fed and provided for throughout the year.

== Nomenclature ==
Though there are no true buffalo species that are indigenous to the Americas, the Southern Michif term for bison is lii bufloo. Bison are not a species of the Bubalina subtribe that includes all of the true buffalo species, but American bison have been known as buffalo since 1616 when Samuel de Champlain applied the term buffalo (buffles in French) to the species, based on skins and drawings shown to him by members of the Nipissing First Nation who had traded with other First Nations that hunted them. There is a very closely related bison species indigenous to Europe, called the European bison (also known as wisent or the European wood bison), however, it's very likely that the early European explorers had never seen nor heard of a European bison as they were essentially extirpated from Western Europe during the Middle Ages.

== Early history ==
Métis buffalo hunting began in the late 18th century. Trading companies working on the plains sought out food items that could last their traders on long trips; pemmican can be stored for long periods of time without spoiling, which made it an ideal product. The Métis commercialized their hunts to engage in trade and supply pemmican to these companies. In these early days buffalo herds still lived in close proximity to the communities, so Métis families in the Red River region could conduct their hunting and trading individually without needing to travel. As settler and Métis populations grew, the buffalo moved further away and hunts increasingly grew in size and scale to keep up with demand and provide for their expanding communities. These changes brought a new organization to the buffalo hunts, with Métis families forming parties to travel in safety.

== Buffalo hunts ==
The Metis buffalo hunts were held at two times during a year by the Métis of the Red River settlements during the North American fur trade. The buffalo hunt out of Red River region had three major parties: the Pembina Métis, the Métis of St. Boniface, also known as the Main River party, and the St. Francois Xavier Métis. The Métis of St. Boniface, situated on the banks of the Red River of the North in what is now the city of Winnipeg, Manitoba, Canada, formed the largest contingent of these hunts; composed of a summer hunt and an autumn hunt. By the 1830s, every major hunt had a common form and governance structure. The largest-scale buffalo hunts began a decade later. For the summer hunts, the three parties would gather at Pembina to organize before continuing on to the buffalo hunting grounds.

All members of the family participated in the hunt in some way; the faster the buffalo meat could be processed and preserved meant less potential for spoilage as a result of changing weather conditions. Men were typically the hunters, while women were responsible for maintaining the camps, preparing and preserving the buffalo meat. A successful hunt could bring in thousands of buffalo.

=== Summer hunts ===
The summer buffalo hunt, otherwise known as the dried meat hunt, traditionally occurred from June to late July or early August. When the season began, the Métis, after sowing their fields in the spring, set out with their wives and children leaving a few behind to take care of the crops. The warmer temperatures made this season ideal for producing dried meat, pemmican, and buffalo tongue, which the Métis would trade most often with the Hudson Bay company.

In 1840 the settlement had over 4,800 people of which 1,630 took part in the summer hunt and headed south on the prairie. Often harassed by the Sioux, the Métis from the various settlements of Red River travelled in large groups for protection. Another smaller portion of the population would join the York boat brigades including the Portage La Loche Brigade heading north.

The buffalo hunts provided the Métis with an impressive organizational structure and by 1820 was a permanent feature of life for all individuals on or near the Red River and other Métis communities.

— Louis Riel Institute

In 1879 the hunters on the prairies of Canada reported that only a few buffalo were left of the great herds and two years later the last of the buffalo herds in the Montana Territory were also gone.

Paul Kane, an Irish-born Canadian painter, witnessed and participated in the Métis buffalo hunt of 1846. Several of his paintings depict scenes of this hunt in the Sioux lands of the Dakota Territory in the United States of America.

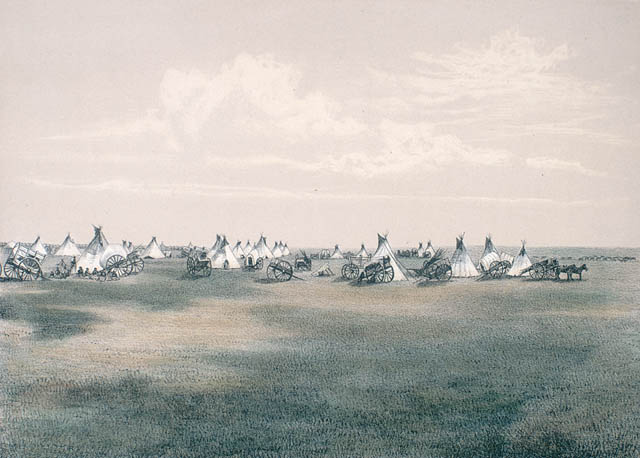
Métis hunting camp in 1873 in the Three Buttes and Milk River Lake, Alberta region (lithograph)

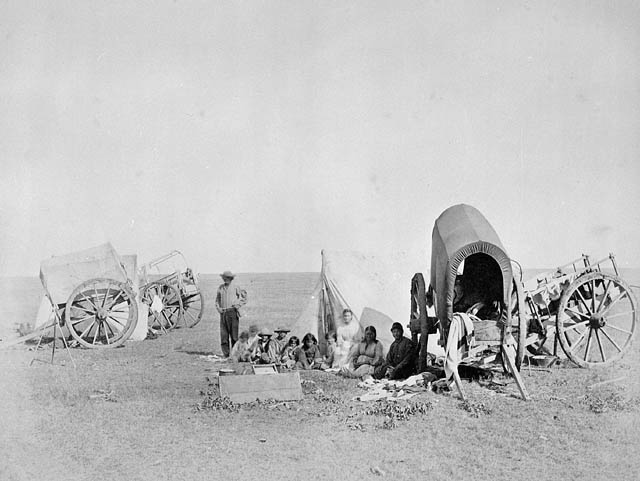
Métis camp in 1874

The summer hunts increased in size from 540 Red River carts in the 1820 summer hunt, 689 carts in 1825, 820 in 1830, 970 in 1835 and 1210 carts in 1840.

In 1823 William H. Keating described a group of buffalo hunters he encountered at Pembina by the Red River. The group had a total of 300 people and consisted of 115 Red River carts and at least 200 horses. These men, he wrote, are Gens libres or freemen and are not Engagés or servants who are employed by the Hudson's Bay Company. The Métis among them are called Bois brulés.

All of them have a blue capote with a hood, which they use only in bad weather; the Capote is secured round their waist by a military sash; they wear a shirt of calico or painted muslin, moccasins and leather leggings fastened round the leg by garters ornamented with beads,&c. The Bois brulés often dispense with a hat; when they have one, it is generally variegated in the Indian manner, with feathers, gilt lace, and other tawdry ornaments.

— William Keating 1824

Their horses are from the southern prairies or from New Spain having been traded and re-traded until they come into their possession. The buffalo runner, a horse bred for speed and intelligence, was used principally for the hunt. Often its saddle and trappings were decorated with beads and porcupine quills and for the hunt its mane and tail were intertwined with multicolored ribbons.

The word given, the horsemen start in a body, loading and firing on horseback, and leaving the dead animals to be identified after the run is over. The kind of horse used is called a "buffalo runner," and is very valuable. A good one will cost from 50 to 70 pounds sterling. The sagacity of the animal is chiefly shewn in bringing his rider alongside the retreating buffalo, and in avoiding the numerous pitfalls abounding on the prairie. The most treacherous of the latter are the badger holes. Considering the bold nature of the sport, remarkably few accidents occur. The hunters enter the herd with their mouths full of bullets. A handful of gunpowder is let fall from their "powder horns," a bullet is dropped from the mouth into the muzzle, a tap with the butt end of the firelock on the saddle causes the salivated bullet to adhere to the powder during the second necessary to depress the barrel, when the discharge is instantly effected without bringing the gun to the shoulder.

— Red river by Joseph James Hargrave 1871

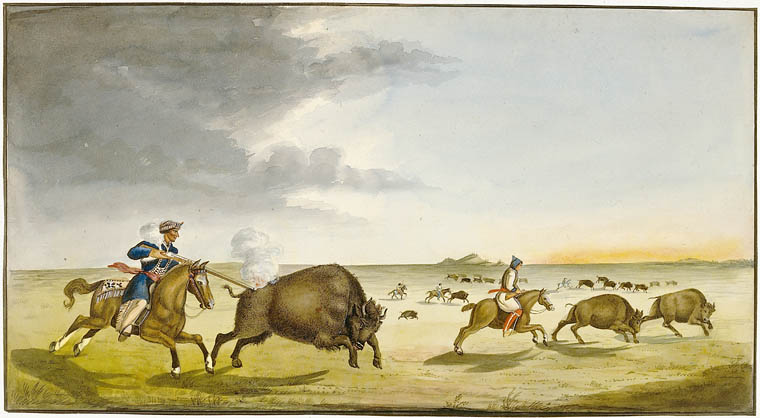
Métis hunting buffalo in summer by Peter Rindisbacher in 1822

Leaving Fort Garry on June 15, 1840 were 1210 Red river carts, 620 hunters, 650 women, 360 boys and girls, 403 buffalo runners (horses), 655 cart horses, 586 draught oxen and 542 dogs in the hunting expedition. In three days they reached their rendezvous at Pembina 60 miles (97 km) to the south and set up a tent city.

The carts were set up to form a solid defensive circle with forks facing out. Within the circle the tents were set up in rows on one side and, facing the tents, the animals on the other side. The animals are kept outside when deemed safe.

At Pembina a count was taken of those taking part (1,630 in 1840), a general council was held and leaders were chosen. Ten captains were chosen in 1840 Jean Baptiste Wilkie being chosen as the war chief and the president of the camp. Each captain had ten soldiers under them. Ten guides were also chosen. A smaller council of the leaders was also held to lay down the rules or laws of the hunt.

Leaving Pembina on June 21 the group travelled 150 miles (240 km) southwest reaching the Sheyenne River nine days later. On July 3, sighting buffalo 100 miles (160 km) further, 400 mounted hunters killed about 1,000. In carts the women then arrived to cut up the meat and haul the pieces back to the camp. It took the women several days to prepare the dried meat. The camp then moved on to another site. That year the hunting group returned to Fort Garry with about 900 pounds (410 kg) of buffalo meat per cart or 1,089,000 pounds (494,000 kg) in all or the dried meat of between 10,000 and 10,500 buffalo.

In 1849 there were two summer hunts from the Red River. The St. Francois Xavier (White Horse Plain) group alone numbered 700 Métis, 200 First Nations, 603 carts, 600 horses, 200 oxen and 400 dogs.

Isaac Stevens of the US Pacific Railroad Surveys (1853-1854) who camped near the Red River hunters near Devil's Lake, North Dakota in 1853 (July 16) provided a description of the 1853 summer hunt. The hunt was led by Jean Baptiste Wilkie and had 1,300 people, 1,200 animals and 824 carts. The camp consisted of 104 tepees, most shared by two families, arranged within a circle of carts which covered in skins provided additional sleeping quarters. The animals are driven into the circle at night and 36 men stand guard on the sleeping camp.

They are generally accompanied by their priests, and attend strictly to their devotions, having exercises every Sabbath, on which day they neither march nor hunt. Their municipal government is of a parochial character, being divided into five parishes, each one being presided over by an officer called the captain of the parish. These captains of the parish retain their authority while in the settlement. On departing for the hunt they select a man from the whole number, who is styled governor of the hunt, who takes charge of the party, regulates its movement, acts as referee in all cases where any differences arise between the members in regard to game or other matters, and takes command in case of difficulty with the Indians.

— Isaac Stevens

Six days later Stevens group encountered another hunting group led by Urbain Delorme of St. Francois Xavier. Delorme led this group, that averaged 500 carts, for 25 consecutive years.

=== Autumn hunt ===
The autumn hunt started in September and ended in late October or early November. When the hunters returned about half of the pemmican and dried meat was kept for their winter provision and the rest sold to the Hudson's Bay Company at Fort Garry. The hunters also had some fresh meat (preserved by the cold). This hunt was smaller than the summer hunt as many of the hunters, the hivernants or winterers, who had taken part of the summer hunt leave the settlements to pass the winter on the Prairies with their families to trap and hunt. The early fall was also the harvest season, so more family members were needed to remain at home to farm (Ens).

Some of the products of these hunts, especially prime buffalo robes taken from November to February, also found their way by the Red River Trails to the American Fur Company at Fort Snelling and exchanged for dry goods such as sugar, tea and ammunition.

== Sioux conflicts ==
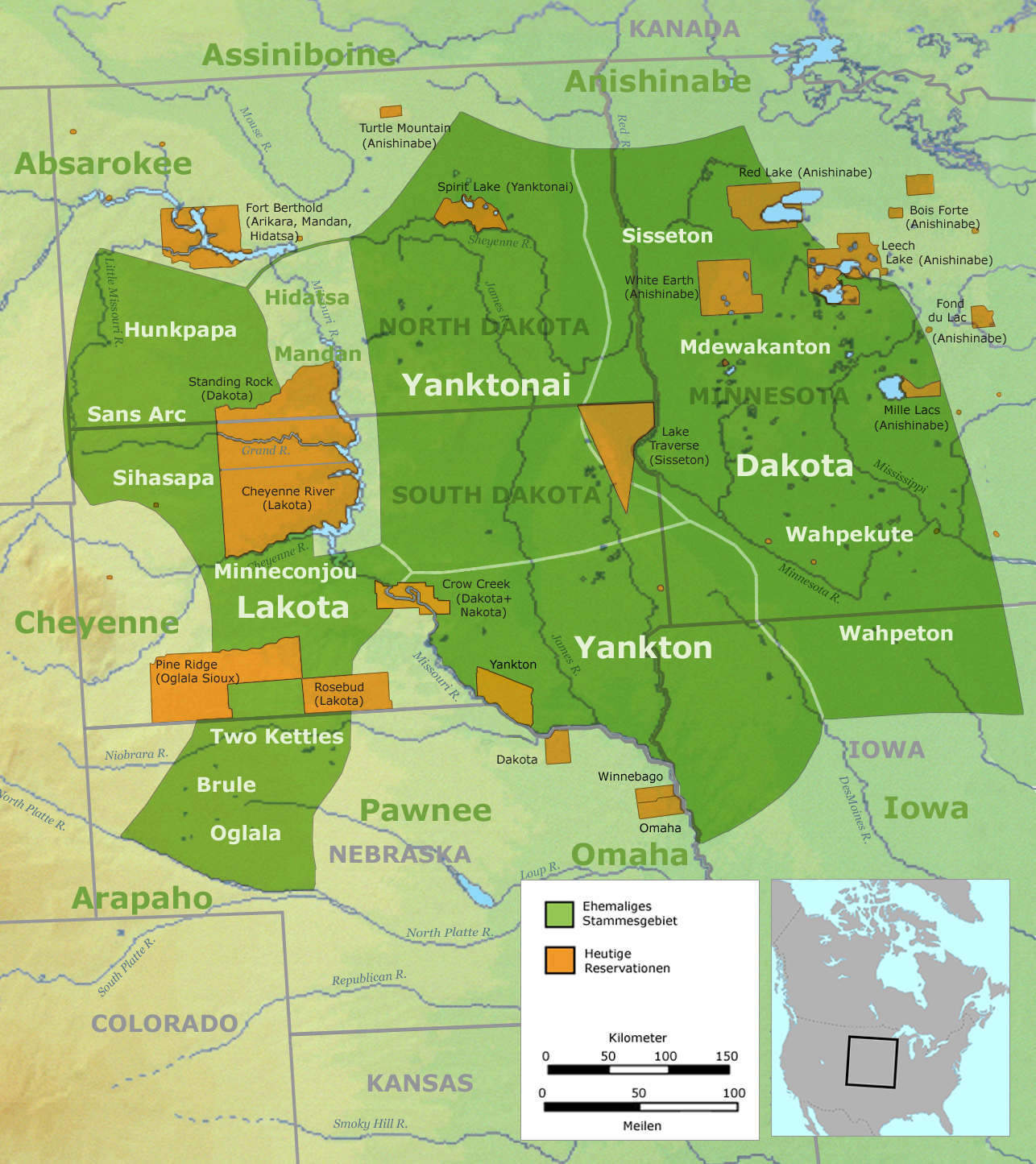
Map showing the general locations of the tribes and subtribes of the Sioux by the late 18th century; current reservations are shown in orange.

During the 1840s and 1850s the Métis followed the buffalo herds further into the Dakota Territory bringing them into conflict with the Sioux. Cuthbert Grant, an early captain of the buffalo hunt, negotiated a treaty in 1844. Another treaty was concluded in 1851 and another in 1854 but Métis hunting groups were still being attacked by the Sioux. Jean Baptiste Wilkie, the leader of the 1840, 1848 and the 1853 summer hunt, helped negotiate a peace treaty in 1859 and another in 1861 between the Métis, Chippewa and the Sioux (Dakota) to set hunting boundary lines. These peace overtures did not last and conflict continued between the Métis and the various Sioux groups even after the Dakota War of 1862.

In the 1848 summer hunt the hunting group, made up of 800 Métis led by Jean Baptiste Wilkie and 200 Chippewa led by Chief Old Red Bear and over 1,000 carts, met the Sioux in the Battle of O'Brien's Coulée near Olga, North Dakota.

Between July 13 and 14, 1851 a large band of Sioux attacked the St. François Xavier hunting camp in North Dakota on the Grand Missouri Coteau resulting in the last major battle, the Battle of Grand Coteau (North Dakota), fought between the two groups. The Métis were victorious.

The St. Boniface group, accompanied by Father Albert Lacombe, made rendezvous with the Pembina group (June 16) then travelled west to meet the St. François Xavier group (June 19). There were 1,300 people, 1,100 carts and 318 hunters in the combined groups. The groups hunted separately but planned to unite against any threat from the Sioux. They divided into 3 groups about 20 miles (32 km) to 30 miles (48 km) from each other moving in the same direction.

The St. François Xavier (White Horse Plain) group led by Jean Baptiste Falcon, son of Pierre Falcon, and accompanied by its missionary, Father Louis-François Richer Laflèche, numbered 200 carts and 67 hunters plus women and children. In North Dakota on the Grand Coteau of the Missouri on July 12 the scouts of St. François Xavier spotted a large band of Sioux. The five scouts riding back to warn the camp met with a party of 20 Sioux who surrounded them. Two made a run for it under fire but 3 were kept as captives. Two would escape the next day and one killed. On Sunday July 13 the camp was attacked by the Sioux. Lafleche dressed only in a black cassock, white surplice, and stole, directed with the camp commander Jean Baptiste Falcon a miraculous defence against the 2,000 Sioux combatants holding up a crucifix during the battle. After a siege of two days (July 13 and 14) the Sioux withdrew convinced that the Great Spirit protected the Métis.

Present at the Battle of Grand Coteau, fighting by their father's side, were 17-year-old Isadore Dumont who died at the Battle of Duck Lake 34 years later and 13-year-old Gabriel Dumont who commanded the Métis forces in the North-West Rebellion of 1885.

== Hunt governance ==
To ensure their success, the buffalo hunts had a set of leaders and other positions such as scouts, soldiers, and lookouts. Each hunt had a chief and council that would be elected amongst the families of the three Métis hunting brigades. At the rendez-vous at Pembina, a count was taken of those taking part (In 1840, the number was 1,630). There would then be a vote by popular assembly, where the heads of major Métis families would select the principal hunt chief and 10 to 12 councillors, or hunt captains. Each captain had ten soldiers under them. Ten guides were also chosen. A smaller council of the leaders was also held to lay down the rules or laws of the hunt. The chief and council was a decentralized and non-coercive government with limited authority; if there was any decision that went beyond the scope of authority given to them, hunt law required that they consult with the heads of households. The Métis believe in self-ownership while also being community and kin-focussed, so this style of leadership allowed for both familial independence and collective organization.

=== Laws of the buffalo hunt ===
In 1840, the following hunt rules were put in place to ensure no hunter would act greedily or harm the other members of the brigade in any way.

1. No buffalo to be run on the Sabbath-Day.
2. No party to fork off, lag behind, or go before, without permission.
3. No person or party to run buffalo before the general order.
4. Every captain with his men, in turn, to patrol the camp, and keep guard.
5. For the first trespass against these laws, the offender to have his saddle and bridle cut up.
6. For the second offence, the coat to be taken off the offender's back, and be cut up.
7. For the third offence, the offender to be flogged.
8. Any person convicted of theft, even to the value of a sinew, to be brought to the middle of the camp, and the crier to call out his or her name three times, adding the word "Thief", at each time.

This leadership and legal structure evolved to become part of a system of self-government for the Métis communities. For example, in 1873 the Southbranch settlements organized a form of local government, under Gabriel Dumont, based on the laws of the buffalo hunt.

=== Laws of the Prairie and Hunt ===
Father Alexis André, a Roman Catholic priest who established a mission in the Parish of St. Laurent recorded the Laws of the Prairie and Hunt that were in use in 1875 and enforced by the Council of St. Laurent, which were based on the laws of the hunt that had been amended and passed from generation to generation. These 25 laws outlined the conduct of the Métis of the community with respect to the annual bison hunts were enforced with strict para-military discipline for the duration of the hunt.

Article I. Every spring at the end of April, a general public assembly shall be held in front of the church of the Parish of St. Laurent to fix the time of the starting for the prairie.

Article II. No one, unless authorized by the Council, can leave before the time fixed for departure.

Article III. Anyone infringing the provisions of Article II shall be liable to a fine amount of which shall be determined by the Council.

Article IV. Should a certain number of men conspire together to evade the provisions of Article II and start secretly, the president shall order the captains to pursue them and bring them back and these breachers of the law shall pay the wages of the captain and soldiers occupied in their pursuit, at the rate of five shillings a man.

Article V. The Council shall be able to authorize the fixed time of departure to be accelerated for those who, by reason of want of provisions, wish to go to the prairie to seek for means of living, but a certain point shall be fixed beyond which they shall not be allowed to go, and they shall by obliged to wait for the great brigade of hunters at the place fixed for the rendez-vous of the whole caravan.

Article VI. Those persons, who having obtained permission to start in advance, shall profit by it to push ahead and to hunt without waiting for the big caravan shall be liable to pay a large fine which the Council shall fix according to the damage caused by them.

Article VII. When once the caravan of the hunters has arrived at the place of general rendez-vous, the camp shall be organized, the captains, the guides for the roads, seekers for the animals shall be named, and the prairie laws shall be in full force.

Article VIII. In the morning, no one shall start before the guide gives the signal and everyone shall stop his carts and pitch his tents in the place pointed out by the guide.

Article IX. All carts shall be placed so as to form a circle and every day the captains and soldiers shall go round the camps to see if there be any break in the line of carts forming the circle.

Article X. It is expressly forbidden to fire when the animals are announced in the neighbourhood; a person infringing on this law is liable to a fine of five shillings.

Article XI. Any person who in the morning when the camp is raised shall fail to extinguish his fire shall pay five shillings; a captain shall be held off everyday to visit all the fires as soon as the camp is raised.

Article XII. The Council shall indicate the hour and time at which the animals shall be chased and also the herd if there are several herds.

Article XIII. If in the course of the hunt a man is accidentally wounded, the person who wounded him shall work for him until he be cured.

Article XIV. If a man while hunting kills another man's horse, he shall pay the value of the horse; should he wound a horse, he shall lend another until the wounded horse is cured.

Article XV. After a run, if new animals appear, no one shall run them without permission from three captains.

Article XVI. He who, after killing a beast, abandons it on the plain, shall pay a fine of one louis.

Article XVII. If any person, or a party of persons, shall steal away secretly in order to run a herd of beasts they may have discovered, they shall pay a fine in proportions to the damage caused.

Article XVIII. Anyone starting before the signal is given by the captains shall pay a fine of one louis.

Article XIX. If a soldier, whose turn for sentry duty it is, shall fail to go to his post, he shall pay a fine of ten shillings; if the offender be a captain, he shall pay a fine of one louis.

Article XX. A soldier sleeping at night on his post shall pay a fine of five shillings; if a captain, ten, and a member of the Council, one louis.

Article XXI. If a captain, knowing the faults of his soldiers, does not report them to the Council, he shall pay a fine of two louis.

Article XXII. No person or no party shall be allowed to leave the camp without leave of the Council; anyone so doing shall pay a large fine.

Article XXIII. If a party under pretence of independence and living in perfect freedom resides in the neighbourhood of the great caravan, the Council of the great camp shall first warn these people not to run the beasts to beyond the time fixed by the Council of the great camp; if they infringe this prohibition, the Council of the great camp shall take measures to oblige these people to join the camp; should they not be willing to do so, they will oblige them to do so by force. (Note: this custom has always been prairie law as far as the Métis are concerned; the savages have enjoyed full liberty unless they were in the camp of the Métis, in which case they could no more separate from the camp than could the Métis.)

Article XXIV. When owing to a scarcity of animals, or one the opinion in the camp is divided about the direction, the camp shall take one side voting for one direction in which they hope to find more animals, and the other an opposite direction, the Council shall call a general assembly and according to the majority shall pronounce for one direction. The minority shall be obliged to submit to this decision.

Article XXV. The period of return when every person shall be at liberty to go where he pleases shall also be determined by a general vote.

— Father A. André, Laws and regulations established for the Métis colony of Saint-Laurent

Father André provided additional commentary on the power and enforcement on these laws, as well as discussing his concerns about the dwindling bison herds and making recommendations about how to prevent their extinction.

Such are the laws for the Prairie. The regulations have produced the greatest good among the Métis and have maintained peace and quietness among these great gatherings of men who free from all check would have given way to all sorts of disorders, but one can say without fear of mistake that the presence of the priest who always accompanies them on the journeys, is the most powerful instrument in bringing these men so proud by nature and so independent in character to submit to these laws. Take away the priest, the laws and regulations will be dead letters as experience only too well proves.

— Father Alexis André, Laws and regulations established for the Métis colony of Saint-Laurent

== Egalitarian practices during the hunt ==
The Laws of the Buffalo Hunt allowed for a structured and regulated approach to the hunt. These laws were targeted at behaviours that could seriously affect the hunt for all members, such as people opportunistically hunting bison ahead of the camp that could result in scaring the herds, the herds running away, and making the hunt more difficult for the whole party. These laws also reinforced the communal nature of the hunts and the egalitarian values of the Métis society. This included communal sharing of the animals killed so that every family would receive enough meat to support itself, regardless of how many animals were killed by any one person. In addition, the hunt chief would make at least one free pass through the herd, and any animal that he killed was to be given to the old and sick who were unable to hunt for themselves. The practices ensured that there was an equal interest in the success of the hunt by enforcing equity among families, and recognizing both familial independence and interdependence.

== Pemmican trade ==
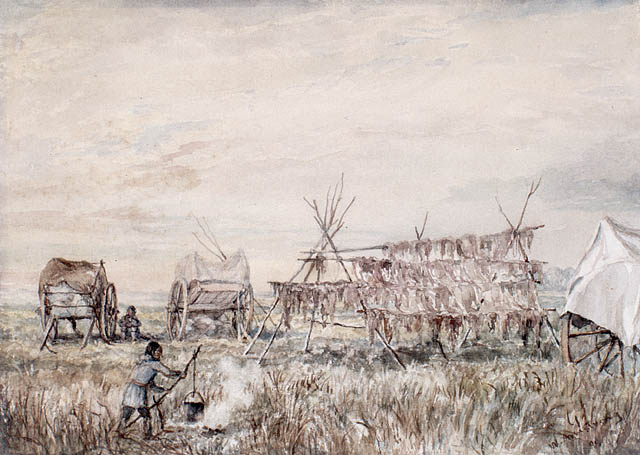
Métis drying buffalo meat, St. François Xavier (White Horse Plains) by William Armstrong

Converting the buffalo into bags of pemmican the Métis would bring them north to trade at the North West Company posts. After the North West Company was absorbed by the Hudson's Bay Company most of the pemmican was sold to the Hudson's Bay Company at Red River.

The pemmican, which forms the staple article of produce from the summer hunt, is a species of food peculiar to Rupert's Land. It is composed of buffalo meat, dried and pounded fine, and mixed with an amount of tallow or buffalo fat equal to itself in bulk. The tallow having been boiled, is poured hot from the caldron into an oblong bag, manufactured from the buffalo hide, into which the pounded meat has previously been placed. The contents are then stirred together until they have been thoroughly well mixed. When full, the bag is sewed up and laid in store. Each bag when full weighs one hundred pounds. It is calculated that, on an average, the carcass of each buffalo will yield enough pemmican to fill one bag.

— Red river by Joseph James Hargrave

The smaller buffalo cow was the main target of the hunt. A buffalo cow, weighing about 900 pounds (410 kg), will yield 272 pounds (123 kg) of meat or 54 pounds (24 kg) to 68 pounds (31 kg) of dried meat. A bull buffalo, weighing 2,000 pounds (910 kg), will yield 550 pounds (250 kg) of meat or between 110 pounds (50 kg) to 137 pounds (62 kg) of dried meat. It takes between 4 pounds (1.8 kg) or 5 pounds (2.3 kg) of meat to produce 1 pound (0.45 kg) of dried meat. A bag of pemmican or a taureau (lit. 'a bull') weighed between 90 pounds (41 kg) to 100 pounds (45 kg) and contained between 45 pounds (20 kg) to 50 pounds (23 kg) of dried pounded meat. These bags of taureaux (lit. 'bulls') when mixed with fat from the udder were known as taureaux fins, when mixed with bone marrow as taureaux grand and when mixed with berries as taureaux à grains.

The product of 1,776 buffalo cows on one autumn hunt in 1845, which 55 hunters and their families with 213 carts took part, was 228 bags of pemmican (pimikchigan) each (90 pounds (41 kg)), 1213 bales of dried meat (viande sèche) each 60 pounds (27 kg) to 70 pounds (32 kg), 166 sacks of tallow (boskoyas) each 200 pounds (91 kg) and 556 bladders of marrow each 12 pounds (5.4 kg).

The Hudson's Bay Company depended on the products of the buffalo hunts well into the 1870s. Samuel MacKenzie, the factor of Île-à-la-Crosse, ordered provisions for the passing brigades in 1871. The list included 240 bags of common pemmican (90 pounds (41 kg) each), 8 bags of fine pemmican (45 pounds (20 kg) each), 10 bags of hard grease (100 pounds (45 kg) each) and 1 bag of soft grease (100 pounds (45 kg)) for the Île-à-la-Crosse Post and an additional 29 bags of common pemmican (90 pounds (41 kg)), 1 bag of fine pemmican (90 pounds (41 kg)) and 1 bag of hard grease (100 pounds (45 kg)) was ordered for the Portage La Loche Post.

For these people on the edge of the prairie the pemmican trade was as important a source of trade goods as was the beaver trade for the Indigenous communities further north. This trade was a major factor in the emergence of a distinct Métis society. Packs of pemmican would be shipped north and stored at the major fur posts: Fort Alexander, Cumberland House, Île-à-la-Crosse, Fort Garry, Norway House, and Edmonton House. So important was pemmican that, in 1814, governor Miles Macdonell nearly started a war (Pemmican War) with the Métis when he passed the short-lived Pemmican Proclamation, which forbade the export of pemmican from the Red River Colony.

== Buffalo robe trade ==
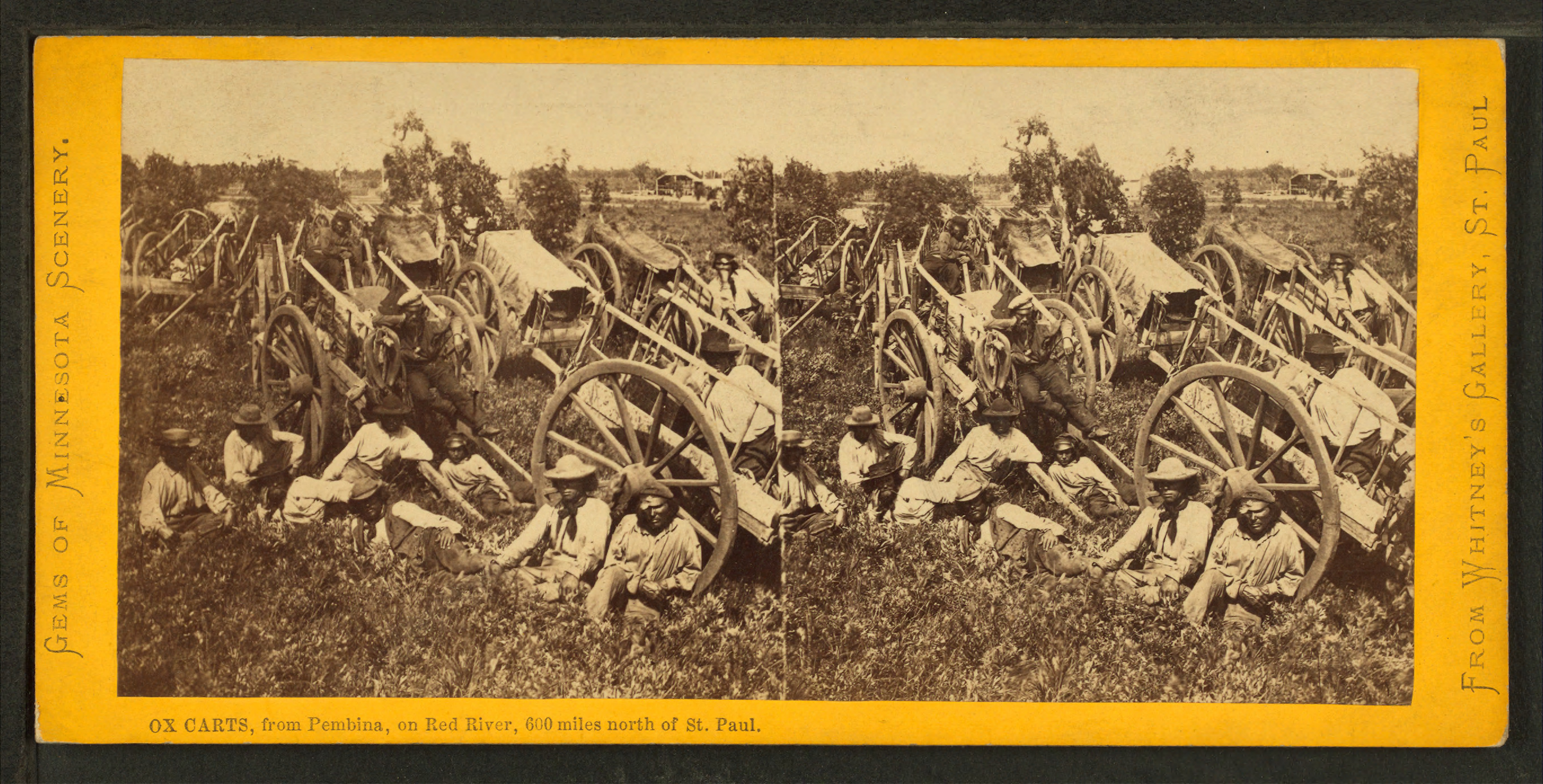
Red River carts at Pembina (1862-1875) A cart carried between 900 pounds (410 kg) to 1,000 pounds (450 kg) of freight

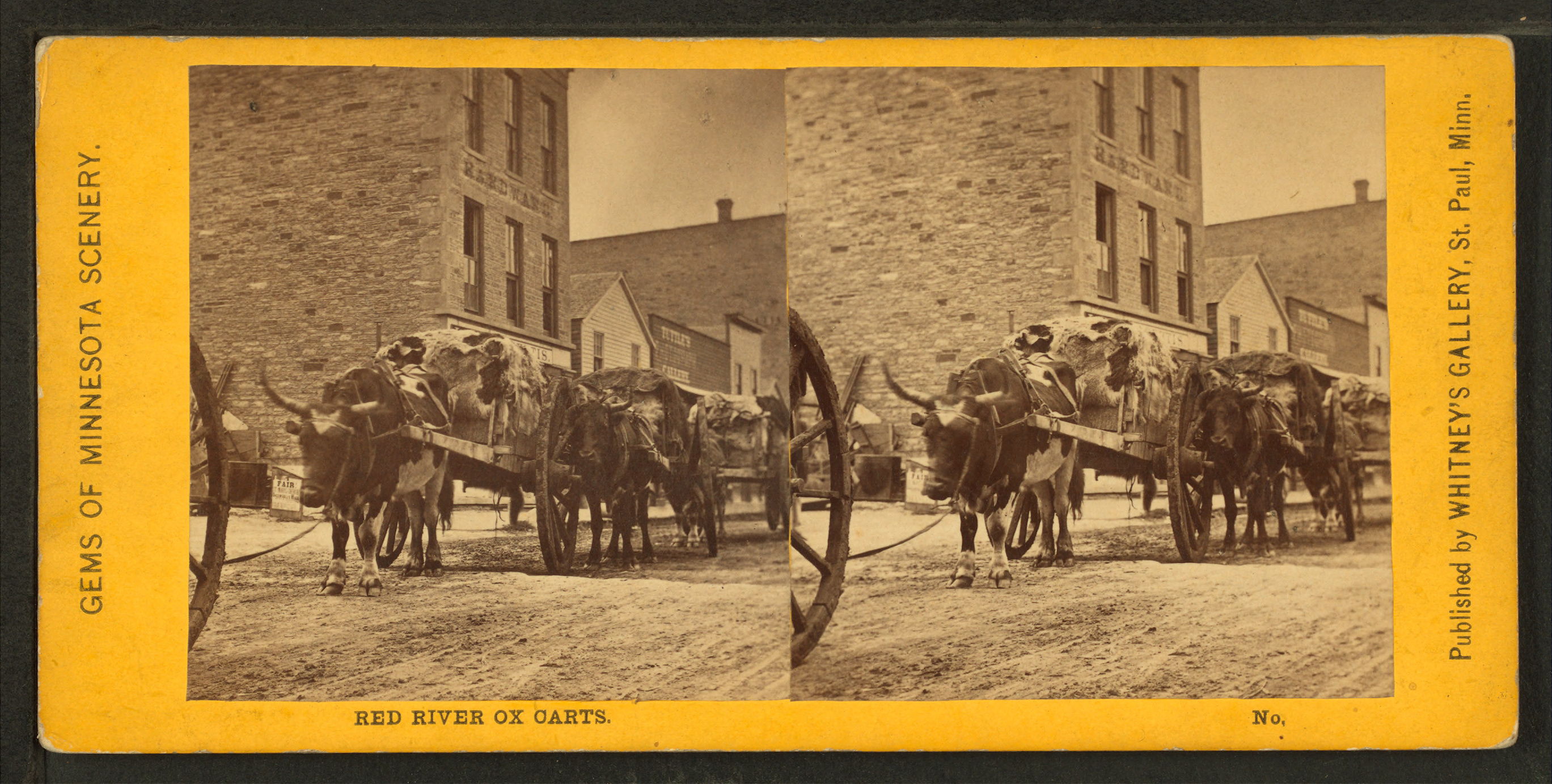
Loaded Red River ox carts from Pembina (Minnesota 1862-1875)

The winter hunts from Red River began in the early 19th century when the population included less than 200 Scottish and Irish settlers, about 100 De Meurons soldiers and a growing number of French voyageurs, descendants of North West Company employees now freemen, and their families. Most spent the winters in Pembina hunting buffalo.

In 1823 Pembina was found to be just south of the Canada–United States border and in 1844 Norman Kittson opened a successful trading post at Pembina in competition with the Hudson's Bay Company at Red River. By 1849 the Hudson's Bay Company had lost its fur trade monopoly (the result of the Sayer Trial) and the Métis could now freely sell their furs. As the price of buffalo robes increased so did the number of carts heading south from Pembina to St. Paul, Minnesota each year: from 6 carts in 1844 to 400 carts in 1855, 600 to 800 carts in 1858 and 2,500 carts in 1869. Most of this freight was in buffalo robes (25,000 in 1865 alone).

A buffalo robe is a cured buffalo hide, with the hair left on. Only hides taken in the winter hunts between November and March when the furs are in their prime were suitable for buffalo robes. The summer hides had little value to traders and neither were the hides of bulls.

=== Hivernants settlements ===
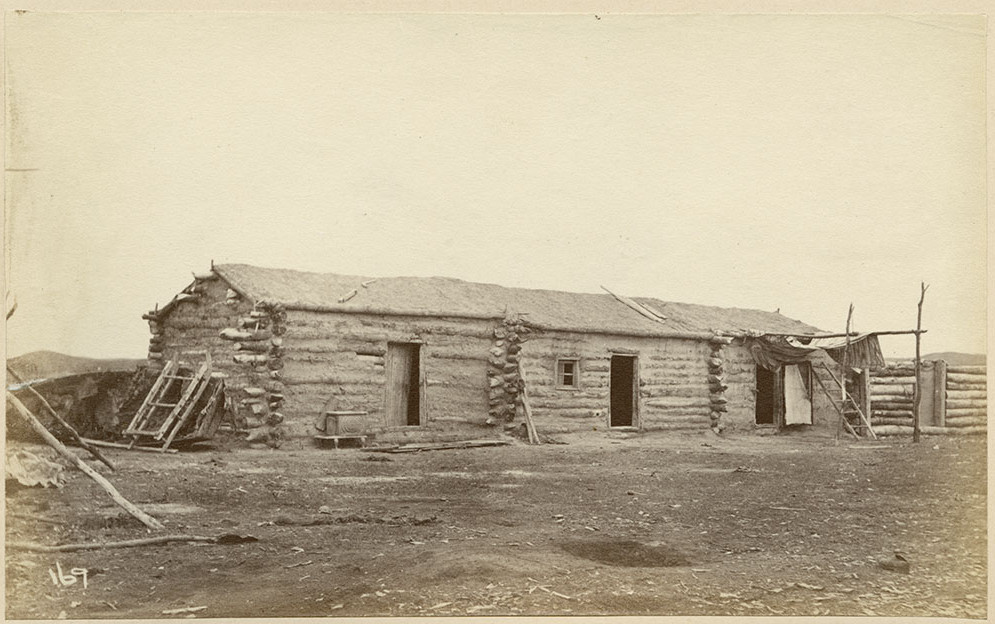
Building at the Wood Mountain, Saskatchewan Métis hivernant settlement in 1874

To exploit the demand for buffalo robes many more Métis would spend the winter on the prairie. From the 1840s to the 1870s Métis hivernants hunting camps were established at Turtle Mountain, on the Souris River, Riding Mountain, Wood Mountain, on the Assiniboine, in the Qu'Appelle valley, on the North and South Saskatchewan rivers, in the Cyprus Hills, on the Battle River, on the Red Deer River, and in Montana.

New permanent settlements were also founded. They were similar to the settlements of the Red River set on river lots. They also organised their own summer, autumn and winter hunts. St. Albert, established in 1861 by Father Lacombe, became the main staging area for the French Métis buffalo hunters of the Fort Edmonton area including the missions of Lac la Biche and Lac St. Anne. From 300 people in 1864 St. Albert grew to 1,000 in 1870. English Métis from the Victoria settlement northeast of St. Albert also organised hunts. In Saskatchewan Gabriel Dumont was the leader of the hunt for his group of 200 hunters living in the Southbranch settlements on the South Saskatchewan River from 1863 to the end of the buffalo hunts.

The St. Albert fall hunt of 1872 found the majority of the hunters still on the prairies experiencing an October blizzard. They found refuge on Buffalo Lake (Lac du boeuf) where they spent the winter. Buffalo Lake and the Red Deer River valley nearby would become an hivernant settlement with over 80 cabins frequented by both the hunting groups of St. Albert and the Southbranch Settlements. The last of the hunts in 1877 and 1878 were failures and Buffalo Lake, perhaps the largest of the hivernants settlements, was abandoned.

== Buffalo herds ==
Map of the extermination of the bison to 1889. This map based on William Temple Hornaday's late-19th century research. Original range Range as of 1870 Range as of 1889

There were two great herds hunted by the hunters of Red River, those of the Grand Missouri Coteau and the Red River of the North and those of the Saskatchewan River. Other great herds existed south of the Missouri River.

The great western herds winter between the south and the north branches of the Saskatchewan, south of the Touchwood Hills, and beyond the north Saskatchewan in the valley of the Athabasca; They cross the South Branch in June or July, visit the prairies on the south side of the Touchwood Hill range, and cross the Qu'appelle valley anywhere between the Elbow of the South Branch and a few miles west of Fort Ellice on the Assiniboine. They then strike for the Grand Coteau de Missouri, and their eastern flank often approaches the Red River herds coming north from the Grand Coteau. They then proceed across the Missouri up the Yellow Stone, and return to the Saskatchewan and Athabaska as winter approaches, by the flanks of the Rocky Mountains.

— Henry Youle Hind 1860

The Missouri Coteau, or Missouri Plateau, is a plateau that stretches along the eastern side of the valley of the Missouri River in central North Dakota and north-central South Dakota in the United States and extends into Saskatchewan and Alberta in Canada. The Missouri Coteau can also refer to a line of rolling hills on the eastern edge of the Missouri Plateau.
