= Bois-Brûlés =

Term associated with the Métis of Canada

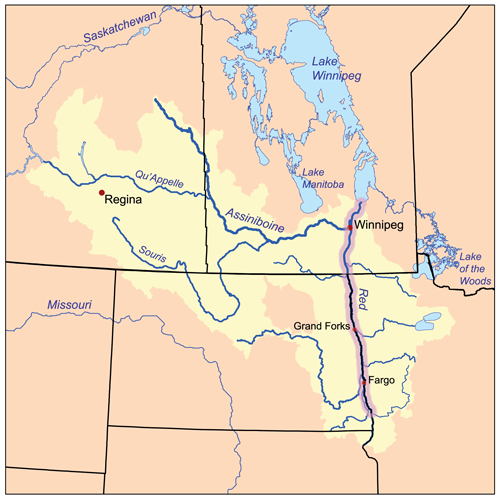
The Red River watershed in Canada and the United States is the region associated with the Bois-Brûlés

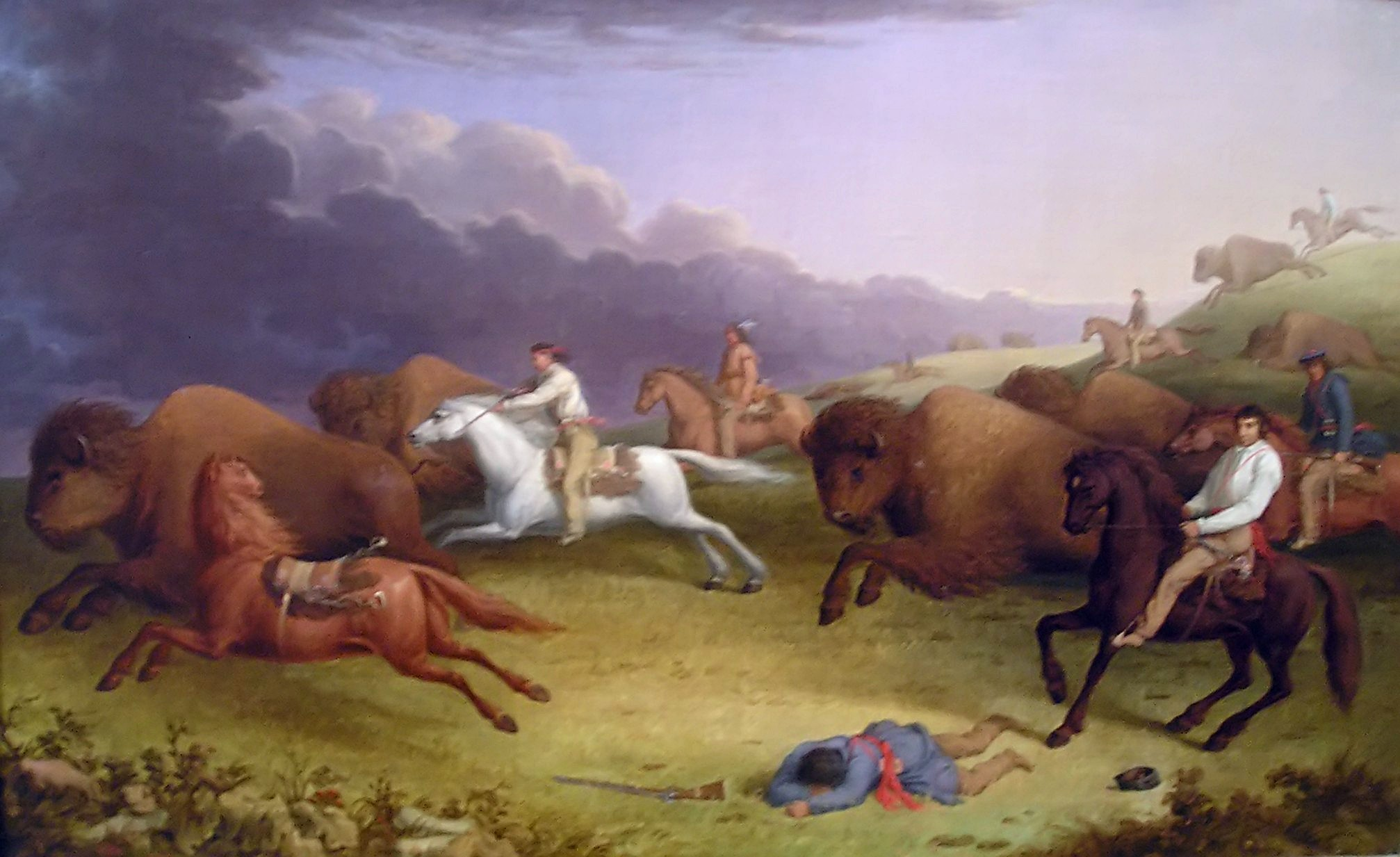
Paul Kane's oil painting depicting a Métis buffalo hunt on the prairies of Dakota in June 1846.

Flag

Bois-Brûlés ('Burnt Wood') are Métis. The name is most frequently associated with the French-speaking Métis of the Red River Colony in the Red River valley of Canada and the United States.

The Bois-Brûlés, led by their leader Cuthbert Grant, took part in the Battle of Seven Oaks (1816). The "Chanson de la Grenouillère", composed in 1816 by Métis bard Pierre Falcon in honour of the Battle of Seven Oaks, also called "Falcon's Song" or "la Bataille des sept chênes", refers to the Métis participants as victorious "Bois-Brûlés", and the song remained central to Métis lore for generations. In 1837 Pierre Falcon also wrote "The Dickson Song" or "Ballade du Général Dickson". The song is about "General" James Dickson who planned to raise an army of Bois-Brûlés for the purpose of setting up a kingdom in California.

William H. Keating described a group of Métis buffalo hunters he encountered at Pembina by the Red River of the North in 1823 as Bois brulés.

All of them have a blue capote with a hood, which they use only in bad weather; the capote is secured round their waist by a military sash; they wear a shirt of calico or painted muslin, moccassins and leather leggings fastened round the leg by garters ornamented with beads,&c. The Bois brulés often dispense with a hat; when they have one, it is generally variegated in the Indian manner, with feathers, gilt lace, and other tawdry ornaments.

— William Keating 1824

Later in the 19th century, the people in 1869 came into temporary prominence during the Riel Rebellion in the Red River area. They were alternatively called Métis; historically the majority were descendants of French Canadian men and First Nations women.

The name Bois-Brûlés seems to have waned in popularity and general use after the merger of the Hudson's Bay Company and North West Company in 1821. The young Canadian adventurer Martin McLeod, later a fur trader and Minnesota Territory politician in the United States, referred to the "Brules" in 1837 in his journal of travel to the Red River of the North region with James Dickson, who had a dream of an Indian empire. As late as 1900, the American author Jack London used the term in his short story, "An Odyssey of the North".

== See also ==
- Turtle Mountain Band of Chippewa Indians
