= Conservation area (United Kingdom) =

Protected area, usually architectural or urban, in the UK

In the United Kingdom, the term conservation area almost always applies to an area (usually urban or the core of a village) of special architectural or historic interest, the character of which is considered worthy of preservation or enhancement. It creates a precautionary approach to the loss or alteration of buildings and trees, thus it has some of the legislative and policy characteristics of listed buildings and tree preservation orders. The concept was introduced in 1967, and by 2017 almost 9,800 had been designated in England.

As of 2019, 2.2% of England making up 2,938 km^{2} (1,134 sq mi) is a conservation area, 59% of which are rural, and 41% are in urban areas.

== History ==
The original idea of historic conservation areas was proposed by June Hargreaves, a York town planner, in her 1964 book Historic buildings. Problems of their preservation. In the book she critiqued the idea that historic buildings should be replaced with modern "streamlined and ultra-functional" buildings as this would be detrimental to the identity of historic towns: "No building within an 'area of special preservation' should be demolished or altered in such a way as to materially detract from the contribution it makes to the group value of the street."

The Civic Amenities Act 1967 introduced the concept of conservation areas, and in September of that year the first designation was made, covering the "old town" area of Stamford, Lincolnshire. The legislation was refined by section 277 of the Town and Country Planning Act 1971, which in turn was superseded by the Planning (Listed Buildings and Conservation Areas) Act 1990.

== Current legal basis ==
The current legislation in England and Wales, the Planning (Listed Buildings and Conservation Areas) Act 1990 (sections 69 and 70), defines the quality of a conservation area as being: "the character or appearance of which it is desirable to preserve or enhance". The current Scottish legislation is the Planning (Listed Buildings and Conservation Areas) (Scotland) Act 1997. In Northern Ireland it is the Planning Act (Northern Ireland) 2011.

== Types ==
Conservation areas can be found across a wide a range of urban and rural UK locations. For example, in the historic centres of town and cities such as Alexandra Palace and Park; model housing estates; historic mining, fishing and transport areas e.g. Crosby Garrett; and rural villages such as Osmotherley.

It is the role of the listed building process to protect individual buildings, and it is common for many listed buildings to also be located within designated conservation areas where those individual buildings make a contribution to the special architectural or historic character of the area.

Current Government planning policy on conservation areas is laid down (for England) mainly in section 12 'Conserving and enhancing the historic environment' of the National Planning Policy Framework (NPPF) and (for Wales) in Welsh Office Circular 61/96 – Planning and the Historic Environment: Historic Buildings and Conservation Areas.

There are additional planning controls over certain works carried out within the conservation area. For example, demolition within conservation areas requires consent. The designation does not preclude development from taking place, but does require that developments preserve or enhance the historic character of the area, for example by ensuring that newly constructed buildings are of a high quality design. Conservation area status also removes some permitted development rights that apply in undesignated areas.

In England, conservation area consent was abolished by the Enterprise and Regulatory Reform Act 2013 and replaced with a requirement for planning permission for demolition of a building in a conservation area. In Wales, the requirement for conservation area consent remains. The circumstances in which such planning permission is required and the consequences of failing to apply for it when it is needed are the same as applied to conservation area consent.

== Designation ==
Local authorities are chiefly responsible for designating conservation areas. They can designate any area of 'special architectural or historic interest' whose character or appearance is worth protecting or enhancing. Local and regional criteria are used, rather than any national standard. In exceptional circumstances, Historic England can designate conservation areas in London, but it has to consult the relevant Borough Council and obtain the consent of the Secretary of State for Culture Media and Sport. The Secretary of State can also designate in exceptional circumstances – usually where the area is of more than local interest.

Local authorities have additional powers under planning legislation to control changes to buildings in a conservation area that might usually be allowed without planning permission in other locations, for example changing the appearance of windows, adding external cladding or putting up satellite dishes.

=== Identity areas ===
Large conservation areas are sometimes subdivided into identity areas, which cover groups of buildings and features having similar character and appearance.

== Enforcement ==
Enforcement of conservation areas varies, dependent on the resources and priorities of the local authority, and many fail to meet expectations. A conservation area may have a conservation area advisory committee, a non-elected body of people, some of whom may be expert, who are concerned about the conservation in the particular area. Historic England maintains an "at risk" register which includes conservation areas.

== Trees ==
The law generally requires that anyone proposing to cut down or carry out any work on any tree, with a stem diameter of more than 75 mm (3.0 in), when measured at 1.5 metres (4.9 ft) height above ground level, in a conservation area must give the planning authority six weeks' notice of their intentions to do the work. Several exemptions from the need to notify exist including for removal of dead trees, the prevention or abatement of (legal) nuisance and for the implementation of planning permission. Work may only be undertaken either when consent has been given by the planning authority or after the six weeks has expired. As of 2012, in England and Wales penalties for cutting down or destroying a tree were upgraded to an unlimited fine (previously this was a fine of up to £20,000) – and the landowner can also be required to replace the tree that was removed. For less serious offences, the penalty is a fine of up to £2,500.

== See also ==
- Article 4 Direction
- List of conservation areas in England
- Conservation designation
- Conservation area
