= Capote (garment) =

Traditional North American garment

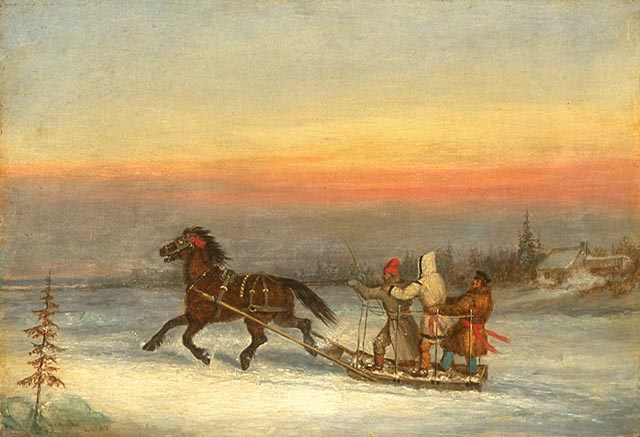
The River Road by Cornelius Krieghoff, 1855 (Three habitants wearing capotes)

A capote (French: [kapɔt]) or capot (French: [kapo]) is a long wrap-style wool coat with a hood.

From the early days of the North American fur trade, both indigenous peoples and European Canadian settlers fashioned wool blankets into "capotes" as a means of coping with harsh winters. The garments served as winter outerwear for First Nations, the habitants and voyageurs of New France, the Métis of the Red River Colony, and the British settlers, traders, and trappers of British North America.

The Hudson's Bay Company (HBC) sold capotes, called blanket coats, made out of the company's "point" blankets. These were sold at HBC trading posts starting the early 18th-century, and were popular among traders for their "wrap" style, which was easy to move and hunt in.

The Canadian Mackinaw jacket, originally made from HBC blankets, serves as a functional equivalent of the Hudson's Bay Company blanket coat. The Hudson's Bay blanket coat served as a template for the Mackinaw jacket.

The English language adopted the French word capote at least as early as 1812.

== Habitant capote ==
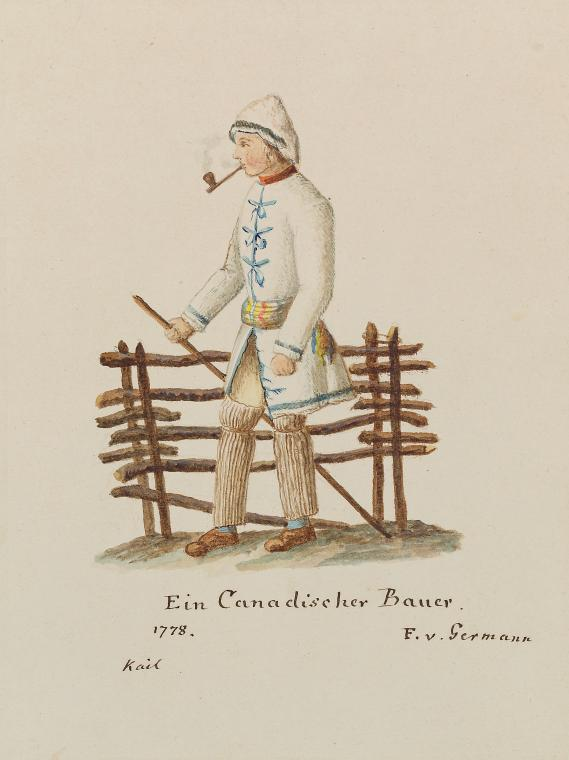
A Habitant in a capote, 1778.

In the early 1600s, French sailors traded their capotes to the Mi'kmaq in North America. By 1619, the French habitants were also wearing capotes. Fifty years later, the habitants wore an altered form of the capote, possibly based on the then fashionable justacorps, or on the French military uniforms of soldiers stationed in New France at the time, such as the Carignan-Salières Regiment. The altered knee length version had no buttons and was worn with a military sash (Ceinture fléchée). The habitant capot was no longer the sailors' capot nor the soldiers' capote, but something distinct, combining features from both.

Capot is the Quebec French word that described this unique winter jacket. From capot came the verb encapoter or s'encapoter also in Quebec French (meaning to put on a capot and other winter accessories before going out).

== Métis capote ==
The Metis man's winter attire was the capote; a thigh length coat with full length sleeves which could come with or without a hood or cape. Most had small shoulder decorations made of red stroud. To keep the coat closed there were both thongs and buttons or a sash.

— Lawrence J. Barkwell

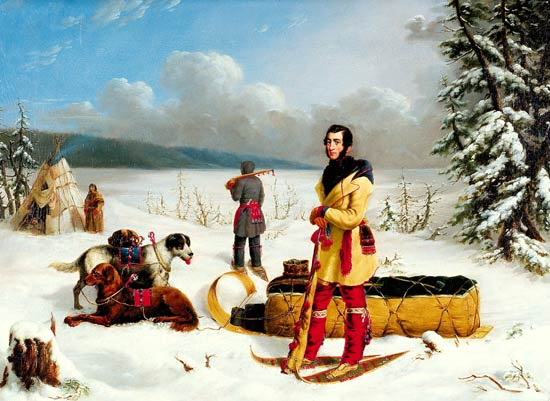
The Surveyor: Portrait of Captain John Henry Lefroy ca. 1845 by Paul Kane. Lefroy is wearing a Métis/voyageur outfit consisting of a capote, a sash, a fire bag, mittens on a string, leggings, garters and moccasins. His companion is also wearing a capote, a sash and a fire bag.

"Red stroud" refers to the "Stroudwater Scarlet", cloth produced in the English town of Stroud, which was used for the uniform of the British Army. The Métis capotes of the Red River area were made of leather or wool. Those made of leather were often decorated with beads and silk embroidery in floral designs. The wool capotes were of different colors; blue was preferred by the Catholic Métis and white by the Protestant Métis while grey was worn by both. A sash was worn around the waist and a fire bag was either tucked in the folds of the sash or hung around the neck by a shoulder strap. A fire bag was used for carrying flints, steel and tinder to start a fire as well as tobacco, pipe, knife and other personal items as most capotes had no pockets.

William H. Keating described a group of Métis buffalo hunters he encountered at Pembina by the Red River in 1823.

All of them have a blue capote with a hood, which they use only in bad weather; the capote is secured round their waist by a military sash; they wear a shirt of calico or painted muslin, moccassins and leather leggings fastened round the leg by garters ornamented with beads,&c. The Bois brulés often dispense with a hat; when they have one, it is generally variegated in the Indian manner, with feathers, gilt lace, and other tawdry ornaments.

— William Keating 1824

== In Canadian culture ==
In the latter half of the 19th century the blanket coat was popularized amongst the European-descended population of Canada to the extent that it was looked on as national dress. Blanket coats had been used for some time before by those with outdoor occupations, but in this period the cut and construction of the coat started to follow changing European and American fashions and became more widely used.

The popularity of the coat was part of a wider movement to adopt aspects of the culture of indigenous people in order to establish a Canadian identity that was separate from both British and United States identities. Two elite groups were important in establishing the blanket coat's popularity. One was the Montreal Snow Shoe Club, which adopted the blanket coat as required equipment. Snow shoeing was another activity adopted from indigenous people and for a time became immensely popular as a sport. The other group was a succession of Governors General of Canada photographed wearing blanket coats. Perhaps even more significant for spreading the coat as a fashion was its wearing by the wives of Governors General, known as viceregal consorts. Initially considered a male garment, by this period it was being made in versions for women and children.

== Gallery ==
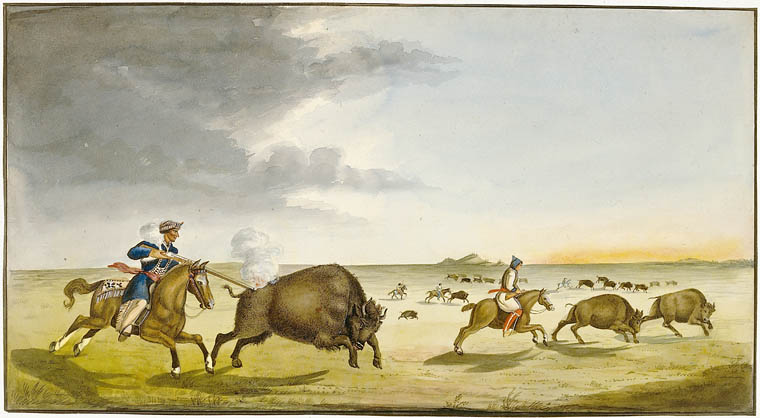
Métis in capotes hunting buffalo in the Red River area (1822)

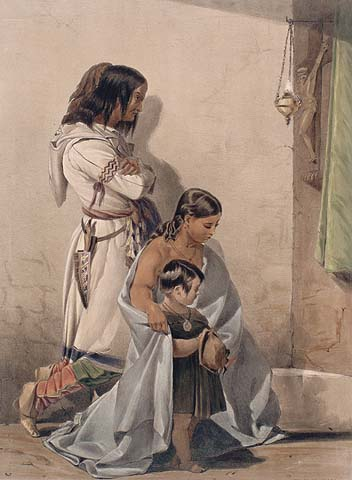
Hurons de la Jeune Lorette, Québec, Canada c. 1838. Blue trimmed white capote and sash

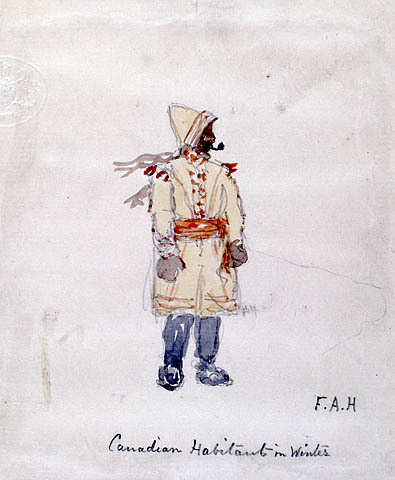
Habitant in winter dress, by Frances Anne Hopkins (1858)

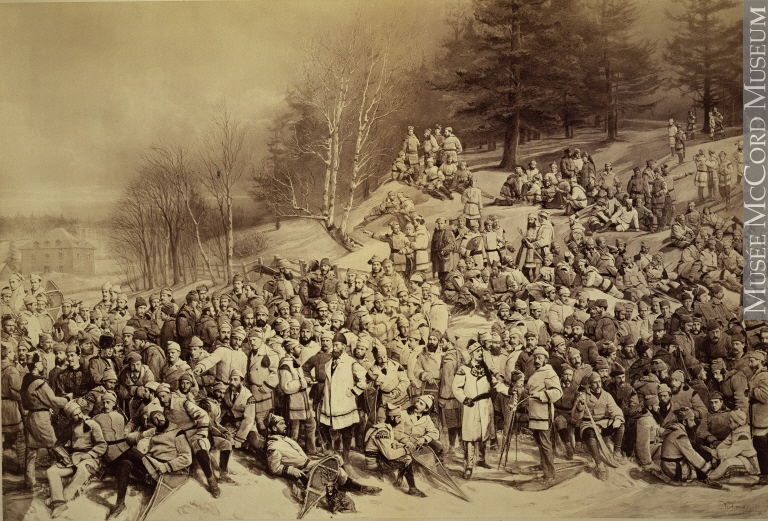
Members of the Montreal Snow Shoe Club in 1877 in capotes and sashes

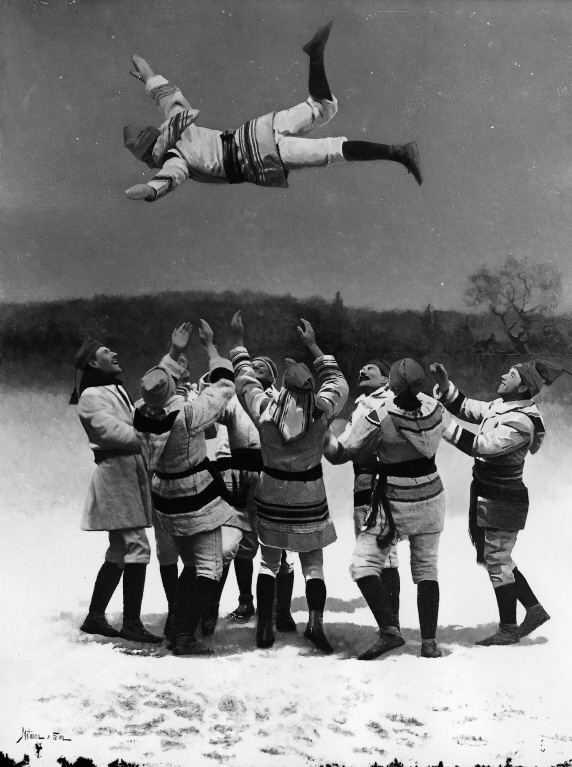
Members of the Montreal Snow Shoe Club in 1886 in capotes and sashes

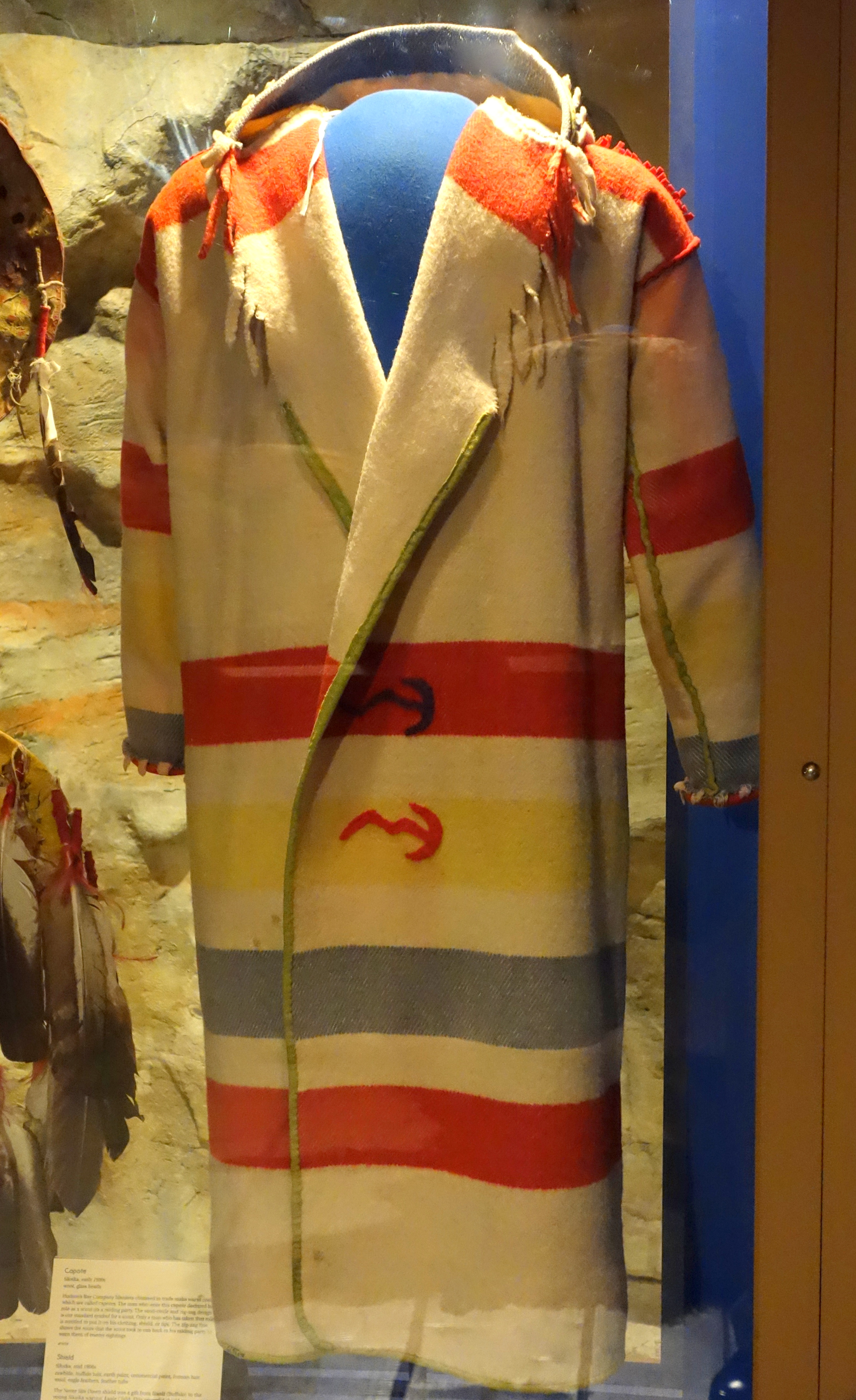
Capote for scout on raiding party, Siksika, early 1900s, wool from Hudson's Bay Company blanket

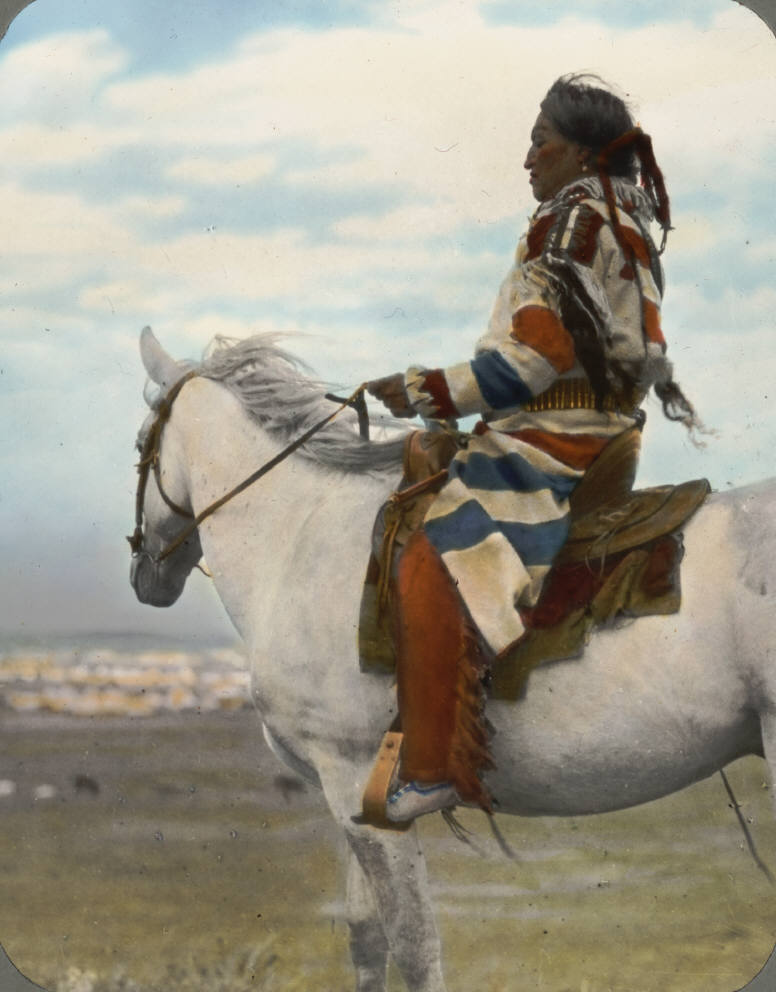
William Jackson (Little Blackfeet) on white horse, Siksika (Blackfoot), Montana. c. 1900s.

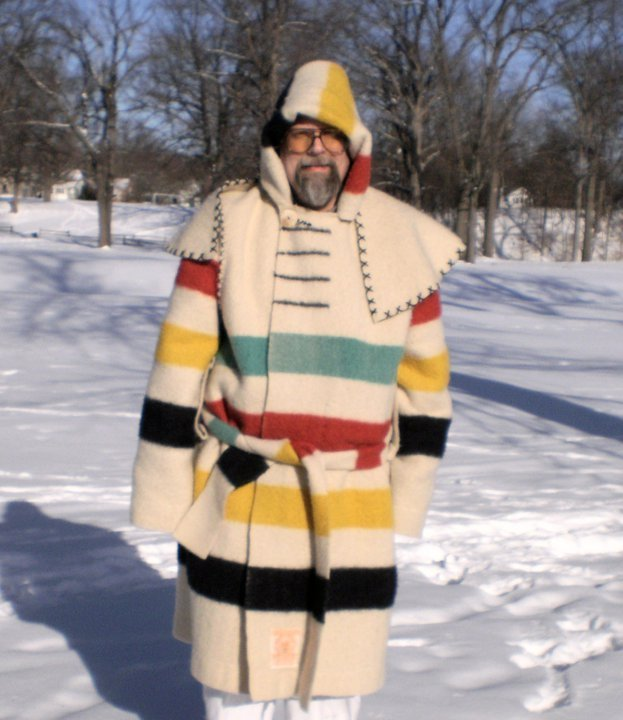
Traditional capote made with a Hudson's Bay point blanket

== See also ==
- Mackinaw jacket
