= St. Laurent de Grandin =

Village in Saskatchewan, Canada

Coordinates: 52°50′00″N 106°05′02″W

Location of St. Laurent de Grandin in Saskatchewan

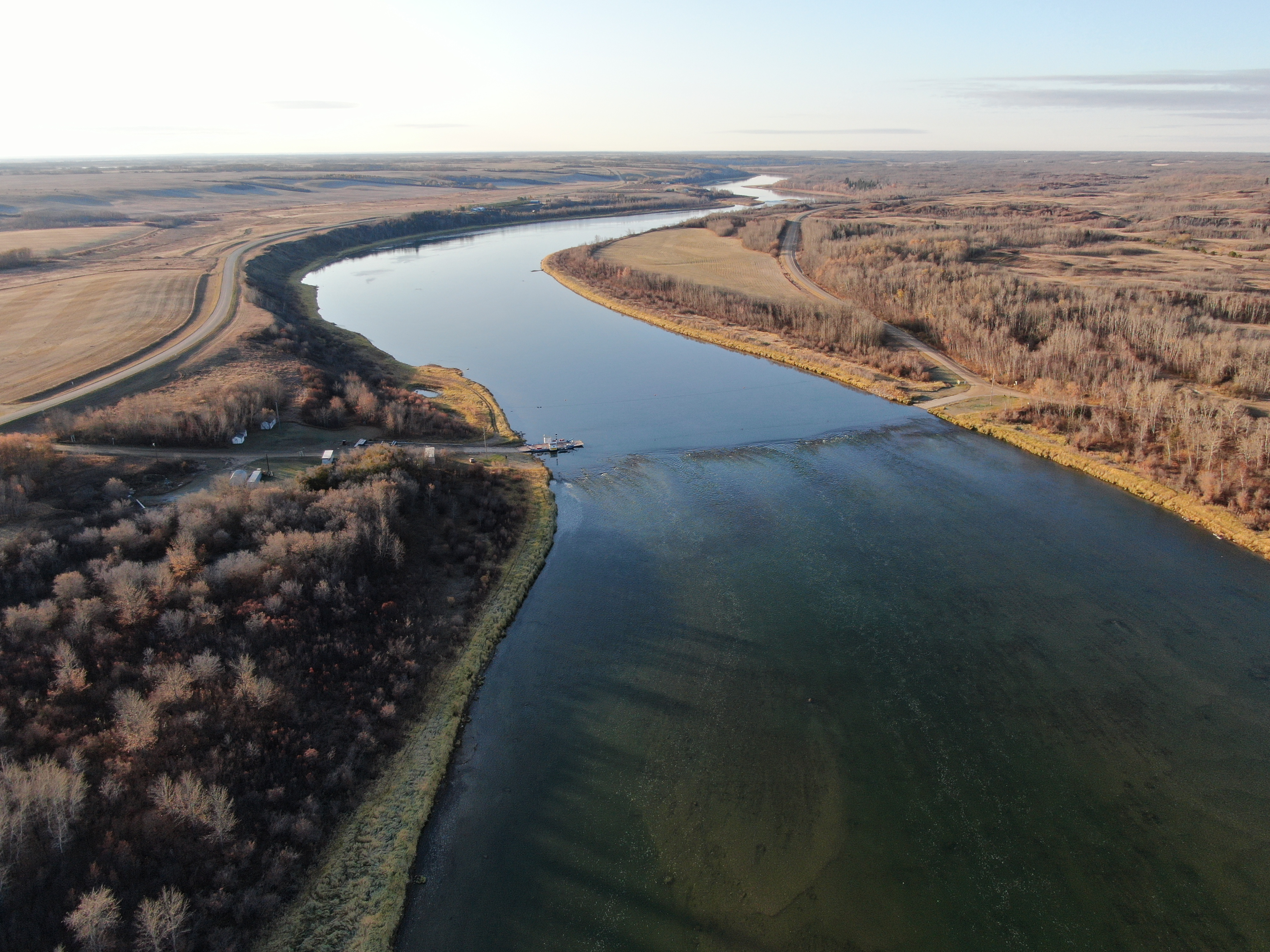
St. Laurent Ferry crossing

St. Laurent de Grandin is an area of Métis settlement along the South Saskatchewan River. It is just east of Duck Lake, and at present is the site of the St. Laurent Ferry, as well as the Roman Catholic Shrine of Our Lady of Lourdes. The shrine is a popular destination for Catholics in central Saskatchewan, and was historically associated with the Métis and Cree people of the area. St. Laurent was part of the Southbranch Settlement and is found downstream from Batoche. It is also a short distance upstream from St. Louis. It is situated in Aspen parkland roughly near the edge of the Nisbet Provincial Forest. Although never a town, St. Laurent was an important area of settlement and of spiritual significance in the area during the late 19th century. St. Laurent's picturesque scenery continues to attract tourists to the shrine along the Louis Riel Trail today.

== History ==
St. Laurent, the oldest, was originally the wintering home of Métis buffalo hunters (hivernants). A mission was established in 1873 by Father André O.M.I. after Métis settlers arrived in the area from Manitoba in the 1860s and 1870s. It had a church, a residential school and a convent. By 1888 St. Laurent also had a post office, a telegraph office and a store. Some of the men killed at the Battle of Duck Lake during the 1885 North-West Rebellion are buried in the cemetery. The mission closed in 1894.

== See also ==
- District of Saskatchewan
