= Montreal Snow Shoe Club =

Canadian sports club

The Montreal Snow Shoe Club (MSSC) was a sports club in Montreal, Quebec, Canada. Founded in 1840 by twelve well-known young men, it was the first club of its sort in North America (and probably the world) and led the way for hundreds of other clubs like it to be established across Canada and the United States. Though as a club the MSSC was significantly pre-dated by others such as the Royal Montreal Curling Club and the Montreal Hunt, it was snowshoeing that pioneered the organization of sport in Montreal. In the 19th century, only lacrosse (and much later, ice hockey) exceeded the total number of urban snowshoe clubs in Canada. In the period before 1867, Lindsay remarks, "a history of snowshoeing in Canada is virtually a history of snowshoeing in Montreal, and, in particular, the Montreal Snow Shoe Club". The MSSC laid the foundations for many other winter and sporting clubs to be established in Montreal, and notably the world's first Winter Carnival.

The MSSC organized an array of races, but they are best remembered for their night-time torchlit processions from McGill's Gatehouse up through Mount Royal Park, wearing their traditional take on the outfits of the old Québécois trappeurs and the infamous tasselled 'tuque bleu'. At the top a hearty dinner was served in their clubhouse, the club's songs were further sung and before the descent new members were "bounced". The MSSC significantly added to Quebec's reputation throughout the British Empire as the most sociable, colourful and cheerful place to spend winter.

== Early years ==
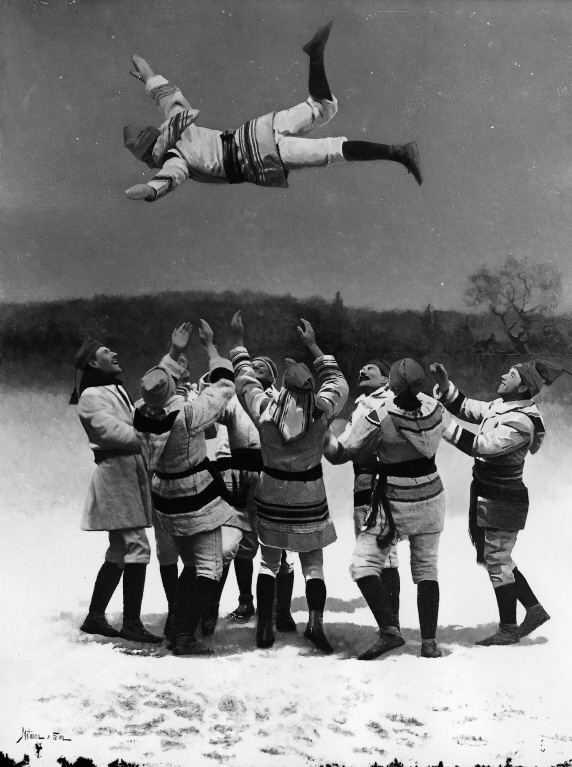
Lord Stanley of Preston being "bounced" as a member of the MSSC in 1886

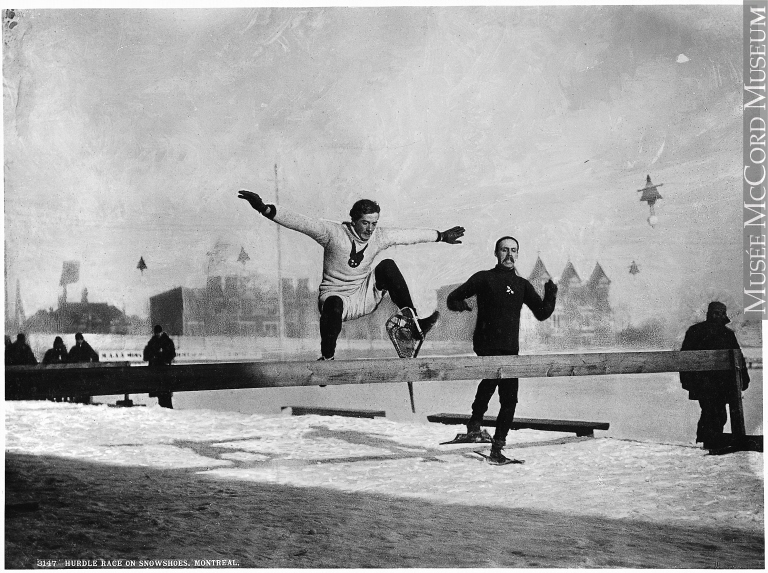
A hurdle race on snowshoes in Montreal, 1892; one of the array of individual events thought up by the MSSC from 1843

In 1840, the first twelve members of the as yet unnamed Montreal Snow Shoe Club (though mainly Anglo, there were several French names too) started by meeting up every Saturday to 'tramp' out into the surrounding countryside. After a walk of between ten and twelve miles, they repaired to a well-known café on Saint Jacques Street, where the proprietor, one Monsieur Tetu, "afforded every luxury relished by the jolly crew".

Tetu's was well-known not just for his choice viand and Henry Hogan's bowl of punch that "served to magnetize those from whom old age had eradicated their tender passion;" but in the continuing melodic synonyms of the club's first historian, Hugh Becket: "Dame Rumour has accused more than one of the handsome fellows who stretched their pedal extremities under mine host Tetu's mahogany, of being attracted thither through the mesmeric influence of the fair dame presiding over the establishment in conjunction with her lord".

In 1843, when membership had significantly increased, the club was informally organized with Colonel Charles Ermatinger of the Royal Montreal Cavalry being elected president. Its 'rules' were drawn from the unwritten traditions of this "Band of Brothers", when memory stood in the place of Minutes and loyalty to the common law of Snow Shoers made any formal code unnecessary. In addition to the weekly 'tramps', the club introduced annual races at the old horse racing field along the St. Pierre River, in what is now Verdun. In good spirit, the club relished all challengers, no matter of their station in life: The MSSC, made up of British officers and Canadians who would become associated with Montreal's Golden Square Mile, competed alongside non-commissioned officers, former voyageurs and native Indians (notably Narcisse and 'the wonder' Keroniare). In those days, ingenuity was welcomed, and Ermatinger heartily congratulated an Indian named Deroche, who on a particularly icey day had beaten him in a steeplechase, having cleverly attached spikes to his snowshoes beforehand.

These tournaments soon became an array of popular individual events cheered on by throngs of spectators. The races were concluded with a large dinner given for all the competitors; involving toasts, prize-giving, speeches, snowshoeing songs, jokes, dancing and "bouncing," the name given to an unusual but favourite custom of the Montreal snowshoers. It was started by the MSSC and afterwards popularly adopted by all the other snowshoe clubs set up after them. Guests of honour, new members or winners of snowshoe races were "bounced", by being thrown into the air repeatedly and caught either by hands or a blanket, as depicted in the picture.

== Clothing ==
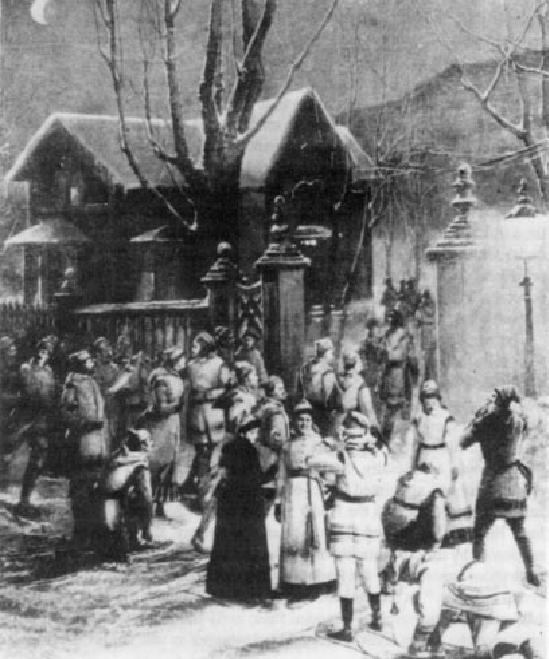
Members of the MSSC at their traditional meeting place, the McGill gatehouse on Sherbrooke Street, before a moonlight 'tramp' in 1889

It is not known when the MSSC members first adopted the outfits they became known for, or when the first moonlight processions were led up Mount Royal, but in 1859 a reporter from the Montreal Transcript joined the club for one such tramp and recounted his experience,

Half past seven o'clock! and here we are at the 'rendezvous' in Sherbrooke Street... all the members are in appropriate costume, namely, a blanket coat (white and hooded), with capote attached, firmly bound round the waist with a sash or belt; blanket continuations and moccasins of moose-skin; together with the indispensable snow-shoe... adorned round the sides with tufts of crimson wool... The route is across the mountain; for your snowshoer looks with contempt upon the beaten road. The more of impediments in the shape of hedges, ditches, and fences, the better for his purpose. Off they go at a rattling pace, for the President steps out, like him of cork-leg notoriety (Milton Sublette - known as 'the Thunderbolt of the Rockies'), and each member has to keep up with him...

In the 1860s, with the rise in the popularity of the Club's races, interest in the MSSC's weekly tramps began to wane. In an effort to revive popularity, club colours were adopted in 1869 to increase the visibility of its members. The colour blue was chosen for the club's tasselled tuques, and soon the term tuque bleue became synonymous with the MSSC and its members. Tuques had been popular in New France since the 18th century. From the 1870s, club membership badges were sewn on to members' blanket coats - red and white in the early 1870s, and red, white and blue from 1875.

== Spirit and expansion ==
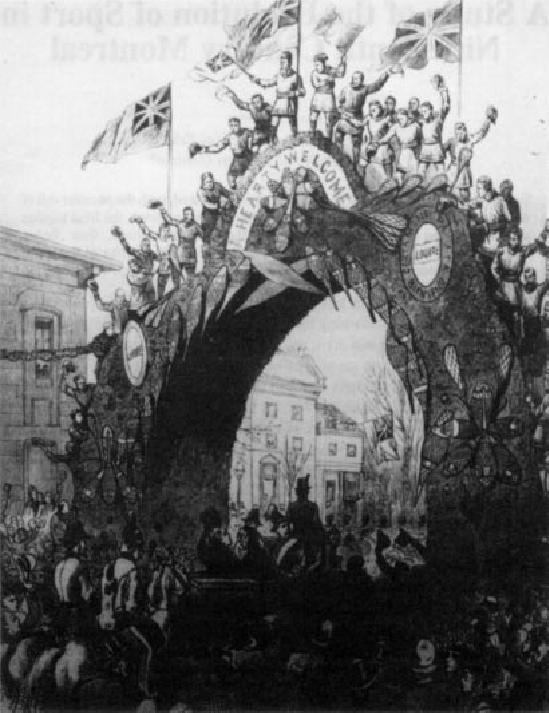
The MSSC's arch constructed in 1878 to welcome Lord Dufferin to Montreal

The club's popularity continued to grow year on year and from 1850 they extended their weekly 'tramps' to Tuesday afternoons as well as Saturdays. The annual races were held at the end of February and the stewards who oversaw the events were usually commanding officers stationed in Montreal, such as Generals Eyre, Williams, Paulet, Lindsay and Michel. In January, 1859, Nicholas 'Evergreen' Hughes presided over the first Presidents Dinner and, "the echo of the shouts and laughter that rang thro' the tree tops of old Mount Royal must have astonished 'McTavish's ghost'."

In 1860, the first two official photographs of the MSSC were to be taken. After the first of all the members (which did not come out well), a second was to be taken of just the officers: "This was a signal failure, the presence of an animated background proving too much for the dignity of the officers, who after several attempts at a suitable state of solemnity, gave up all idea of a picture, much to the delight of background brilliants". The old military camaraderie that had surrounded the MSSC since its origins remained, and prior to the Confederation of Canada in 1867, 'Evergreen' Hughes gave a speech linking the snowshoers' "bodily superiority" to the success of the "future Kingdom of Canada".

From this institution other clubs quickly sprang up, notably the two most famous French Canadian clubs in Montreal: The Canadien de Montréal (founded in 1878) and the Trappeur de Montréal. By 1885, there were twenty five snowshoe clubs in Montreal alone, which led to the creation of the Union Canadienne des Raquetteurs (the Canadian Snowshoers' Union), who held their first convention at Quebec City in 1907.

Since 1997, the Tuques Bleues Celebration has been organized by Les Amis de la Montagne (a charity that works to protect and preserve Mount Royal Park), re-introducing snowshoe tramps by traditional torchlight up the mountain.

== Early members ==
In 1882, Hugh Becket, the MSSC's historian, recalled twelve of the earliest names associated with the club from 1840: The Hon. Edward Ermatinger (the club's first president in all but name in 1843); Colonel Édouard Juchereau du Chesnay; Nicholas Hughes Burroughs; The Hon. Charles-Joseph Coursol; Frederick Matthews; Romeo Harrison Stephens (brother of the elder George Washington Stephens); Sir George Conway Colthurst 5th Bt.; and, The Hon. Edward Goff Penny. He mentions also Mr Lamontagne, Mr Lamothe, Mr Harris and one Frank Brown.

== See also ==
- McGill Outdoors Club
