= Hivernants =

Temporary villages in Canada

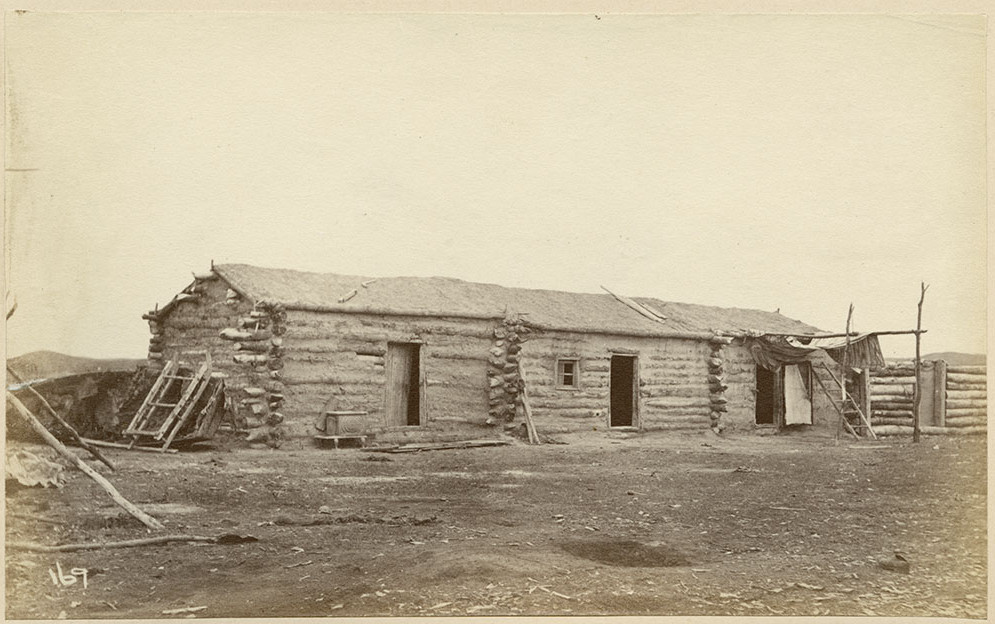
Building at the Wood Mountain, Saskatchewan Métis hivernant settlement in 1874

Hivernants were used during the North American fur trade to describe Métis who spent the winter months hunting and trapping on the Canadian prairies where they built small temporary villages. The word is French for "winterer". "Hiverner" the verb means to overwinter.

The hivernants were active in hunting buffalo (bison) during the cold-weather season (mid-November to mid-March) when the bison's hair was thick enough for the production of buffalo robes. This was as opposed to the summer hunt, which was primarily aimed at harvesting meat.

Hivernant was also applied to a fur trade employee who wintered in the wilderness (usually at a trading post).

The term may also refer to a vacationer who spends the winter months at a resort or vacation center in a warmer climate. During the nineteenth and twentieth centuries, many of the seasonal visitors to the French Riviera were referred to as hivernants. With the ability to vacation abroad (or domestically if they were French) for months on end (usually October until May), these hivernants were typically wealthy elites.

== Settlements ==
From the 1840s to the 1870s Métis hivernants hunting villages were established at Turtle Mountain, on the Souris River, Riding Mountain, Wood Mountain, on the Assiniboine, in the Qu'Appelle valley, on the North and South Saskatchewan rivers, in the Cypress Hills, on the Battle River, on the Red Deer River, and in Montana.

The Southbranch settlements of Batoche and St. Laurent de Grandin in Saskatchewan were founded by French Métis hivernants from the Red River settlement in Manitoba, Canada.

Moose Jaw, Willow Bunch, Lebret in Saskatchewan and St. Albert, Lac La Biche, Lac Ste. Anne in Alberta also began as Métis hivernants settlements.

== See also ==
- Block settlements
- Buffalo coat
- Hivernants settlements
- Métis buffalo hunt
