= Hargrave River =

Hargrave River may refer to:

- Hargrave River (Manitoba)
- Hargrave River (Nunavut)

== See also ==
- Hargrave (disambiguation)
