= Jean Baptiste Wilkie =

Metis chief

Jean Baptiste Wilkie (c. 1803–1886) was a Métis warrior, buffalo hunter and chief from the area of Pembina, North Dakota.

Wilkie's father, Alexander, was of Scottish origin and his mother was a Ojibwe (Chippewa) named Mezhekamkijkok. In the mid-1820s, he operated a horse ranch on the Red River in an area now known as St. Vital, Manitoba. During this time he married Amable Elise Azure; they would eventually have thirteen children together. Wilkie's daughter Madeleine was the wife of Métis military leader Gabriel Dumont. Wilkie was a member of the Red River Volunteers, a militia corps raised to defend the Red River Colony in 1835.

After the Hudson's Bay Company began to restrict Métis trade, the family relocated to Pembina in the 1840s, where Wilkie continued to hunt buffalo. On June 15, 1840, he led 1,630 hunters in a buffalo hunt, and was elected to be the most senior captain of the hunt by its leadership council. Wilkie acquired a reputation for leadership and skill, and eventually became regarded as "the chief of the Half Breeds in the Pembina/St. Joseph area". Wilkie was leader of the hunt in 1848 when the group clashed with the Sioux at the Battle of O'Brien's Coulée near Olga, North Dakota, and again in 1853 when he met Isaac Stevens of the US Pacific Railroad Surveys near Devils Lake, North Dakota.

In the 1860s, Wilkie made peace between the Métis and the Dakota, who had been enemies for many generations. Wilkie and Peter Grant traveled to Washington and met with U.S. President Abraham Lincoln, who provided them with ammunition. Wilkie and several other men went into a Dakota village and asked to meet with the chief. The meeting started off tense, and the Dakota warriors were said to have been so angry that they slashed the cloth covering the lodge. After smoking the ceremonial pipe, an agreement was made. Later, the Métis and Dakota met at Grand Coteau in order to trade and get to know each other. So much horse trading went on between the groups that afterward it was said that none left with the same horse they brought.

== See also ==
- Louis Riel
