= June Hargreaves =

British town planner and conservationist

June Hargreaves MBE (b.1937) is a British town planner and heritage conservationist.

== Biography ==
Hargreaves grew up in Cowling, West Yorkshire and attended Keighley Girls’ Grammar School. She trained as a planning officer for West Riding County Council in Skipton.

In 1961 June moved to York as a Senior Planning Officer for York City Council. In this role she found the destruction of historic buildings in the city as problematic, prompting her to write a book on conservation. Her 1964 book Historic Buildings: Problems Of Their Preservation was a key influence on the Civic Amenities Act 1967 which led to the creation of conservation areas throughout the UK, directly addressing the problem she saw in York. The principle she suggested placed the emphasis on conservation of whole areas rather than individual buildings.

David Fraser, then chief executive of York Civic Trust described June as "the single most influential voice in England calling for the creation of Conservation Areas... At a time when women were not regarded as equals in the workplace, she marshalled the arguments; expressed them eloquently in her seminal publication; and personally convinced senior civil servants and government ministers to change the law. June Hargreaves is a giant amongst conservationists."

Hargreaves retired from the City Council in 1988, after which she was a founding member of the York Archaeological Trust and a prominent member of York Civic Trust.

Hargreaves was awarded an honorary doctorate from the University of York in 2000. In June 2015 Hargreaves was the winner of the inaugural Lord Mayor's Award.

== Publications ==
- Hargreaves, J.M. 1964. Historic buildings: Problems of their preservation. York, York Civic Trust.
- Hargreaves, J.M. 1976. The history of Ickornshaw Methodist Church.
- Suddards, R.W. and Hargreaves, J.M. Listed buildings : the law and practice of historic buildings, ancient monuments, and conservation areas. London, Sweet & Maxwell.
