= Letitia MacTavish Hargrave =

Canadian settler and writer (c. 1813–1854)

Letitia Hargrave
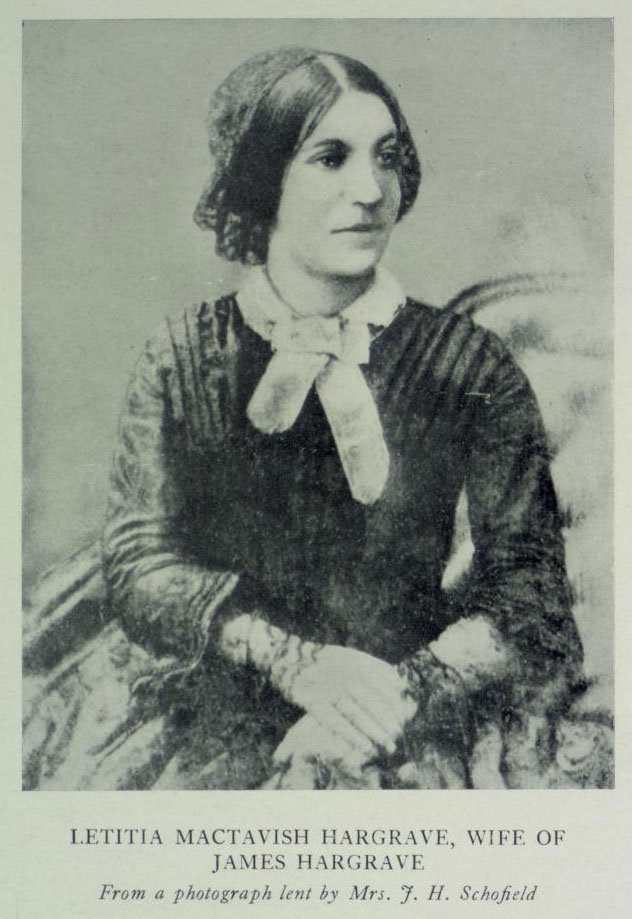
- Born: Letitia MacTavish c. 1813; Edinburgh, Scotland
- Died: 1854 (aged 40–41); Sault Ste. Marie, Canada
- Resting place: St. James Cemetery, Toronto
- Spouse: James Hargrave
- Children: Joseph James Hargrave
- Relatives: William Mactavish (brother)

Letitia MacTavish Hargrave (c. 1813 – 18 September 1854) was a Scottish-born Canadian settler and socialite. The wife of Hudson's Bay Company trader James Hargrave, MacTavish-Hargrave travelled across the Canadian frontier, mainly staying at the York Factory settlement south of Churchill, Manitoba and in Sault Ste. Marie, Ontario. MacTavish Hargrave is known for a series of written correspondence which detail a female perspective of accounts detailing life in colonial Canada in the 19th century.

Born in Edinburgh, Scotland, in 1813, Letitia MacTavish Hargrave was the eldest of nine children of Dugald MacTavish, 20th Hereditary Chief of Clan MacTavish, and Letitia Lockhart. MacTavish met her future husband, James Hargrave, through her brother, William — later the 21st Hereditary Chief of Clan MacTavish — and his career in the HBC. Letitia MacTavish and James Hargrave married on 8 January 1840. In the following spring, the couple travelled to London to the home of Governor-in-Chief of the Hudson's Bay Company, George Simpson. Letitia would develop a long-term friendship with Simpson's wife and sister-in-law-Frances and Isobel, respectively.

The newly married couple embarked from the United Kingdom to James’ post at the York Factory settlement and HBC trading post in the summer of 1840. The dramatic and bleak change of scenery led Letitia to write a series of letters to family detailing life as a pioneer in the Northwest of Canada on the Hudson's Bay amongst traders and Indigenous peoples. Though located in the vast, cold expanses of the North, the Hargraves enjoyed a position of relative comfort and privilege. The Hargraves stayed at York Factory until James' position at the HBC was transferred to Sault Ste Marie in 1851. As James was sent to work in Sault Ste Marie, he sent Letitia and their children to the UK temporarily. Returning in 1852, the Hargraves were reunited and lived at the HBC post until Letitia's death by cholera on 18 September 1854; her husband took her body to Toronto for burial at St James' Cemetery.

== Biography ==
=== Early life and family ===
Letitia MacTavish Hargrave was born into a prominent Scottish family in Edinburgh in 1813. The eldest child of Dugald MacTavish and Letitia Lockhart, she was the first of nine children; Florence, Mary, William, Dugald, John George, Lockhart, Hector, and Alexander, followed her.

Born into a wealthy family—her father Dugald MacTavish, 20th Hereditary Chief of Clan MacTavish, serving as Sheriff Substitute at Campbeltown—Letitia was given the best education available to women at the time, with her and her sisters—Florence and Mary—finishing their education at a ladies’ finishing school. Letitia would develop strong relationships with her two sisters. The MacTavish family would enjoy an upper-class life while growing into adulthood.

The already prominent family was given further opportunity through the children's uncle, John George MacTavish who, through his connections as an officer in the Hudson's Bay Company, convinced the eldest brothers, William and Dugald, to join the HBC in British North America (BNA). The nine MacTavish children would eventually part ways and emigrate around the world.

=== Marriage to James Hargrave ===
As Letitia MacTavish's brother William experienced great political success in the HBC, he was introduced to one James Hargrave, a Chief Trader based in Rupert's Land.

James Hargrave (1798–1865) was a Scottish expat living in British North America at this time. Coming from a wealthy family with deep roots in Scotland, James was well-read, well educated and well connected. Much of the Hargrave family eventually emigrated to BNA in 1819–1820. James Hargrave joined the North-West Company following his emigration and came under the tutelage of John George MacTavish. The union between the North-West Company and the HBC led the two to be folded into the new company, being stationed at York Factory in Rupert's Land.

James Hargrave returned to Britain on medical leave in 1837 where—at the behest of his good friend, William MacTavish—he visited the MacTavish family. James met Letitia MacTavish in the early months of 1838 and very quickly intended to marry her. They would marry on 8 January 1840, where they would remain in Scotland until late April.

Following their marriage, Letitia and James Hargrave were invited to stay with sir George Simpson, Governor-in-Chief of the Hudson's Bay Company, in his home in London. The couple would remain in Britain until the summer of 1840.

=== In Rupert's Land ===
James and Letitia Hargrave embarked from Britain to the New World in 1840. The particularly rough voyage (for a well-to-do Scottish Lady) in a Hudson's Bay Company cargo ship caused a fair bit of discontent for the young Mrs. Hargrave, and the subsequent dramatic change in the way of life at York Factory were the first obstacles in forging a new life in Rupert's Land.

York Factory, located in the far Northern expanse of modern-day Manitoba, was a major trading post for the Hudson's Bay Company. At the mouth of the Hayes River, the trading post gave access to the vast waterways protruding from the Hudson's Bay throughout the Northwest.

This was the new, rugged home of Letitia MacTavish Hargrave. The Hargraves essentially had full control over a district "more than twice the size of Great Britain". Letitia's experiences in adapting from a socialite life in Britain to that of an important woman on the frontier is the source of many of the compiled letters attributed to her, in which she describes life in the frozen wastes of the North and her dealings with fellow trader's wives, the local indigenous peoples and the dramatic weather.

Letitia held on to the societal and material comforts to which she was accustomed, wearing elaborate gowns and retaining a host of servants in the manor in which they lived. Letitia adapted to the new world in which she lived by holding on to the lifestyle to which she was accustomed.

Letitia, as the only permanent white female resident at York Factory, enjoyed a life of privilege and reverence from the native inhabitants of the settlement, developing unique relationships with local "Squaw" women, who referred to her as a Chieftainess in their own language.

The Hargraves would spend the next ten years at York Factory, bearing four children (Joseph James, Letitia Lockhart, Mary Jane, Dugald John) and bringing future scholars a unique perspective to the frontier.

The welfare of her young family was the prime concern for Letitia Hargrave in York Factory. The birth of Joseph James in 1841 and the subsequent persuasion of her husband to build a nursery began this focus on the new generation of Hargrave children. In early December 1842, the Hargraves welcomed a second son into the world, to which the child unfortunately died after an undisclosed illness on 27 December 1842. Despondent, Letitia remained in the manor, overcome with grief, for several weeks. The Hargraves had refrained from having more children until, on 24 October 1844, they gave birth to a daughter, Letitia Lockhart who was much beloved by her mother.

In 1846, the Hargraves returned to Britain, mainly due to Letitia's declining health. The family remained in Edinburgh for Letitia's recovery until the following year, in which they separated from their son, Joseph James, so he could receive an education. The rest of the Hargraves returned to York Factory in 1847. The Hargraves had another daughter, Mary Jane, on 11 July 1848 in York Factory.

The next two years saw a decline in the overall well-being of James Hargrave, as stress and age were putting strain on the family. In the fall of 1850, James received orders from the HBC to transfer to the trading post at Sault Ste. Marie, a much more livable area of Rupert's Land. James left for Sault Ste. Marie in 1851, after securing his family's return to Britain, where Letitia enrolled her daughter Letitia Lockhart in school in Edinburgh with Joseph James. The Elder Letitia would not be reunited with James until the following summer.

=== Later life and death ===
Letitia MacTavish and James Hargrave reunited and began living in Sault Ste. Marie in 1852. The couple and their young children would live there until 1854, when Letitia died of cholera on 18 September after a very short stint with the illness. A few months later, their youngest, Dugald John, also died. Emotionally destroyed by these tragedies, James Hargrave left his post at Sault Ste. Marie and returned to Scotland, resigning from the Hudson's Bay Company. Letitia's body was brought to Toronto and is interred there.

== Letters and correspondence ==
The Letters of Letitia MacTavish Hargrave were saved by friends and family and were eventually compiled and edited by historian Margaret Arnett MacLeod for the Champlain Society. In the course of her research Mrs. MacLeod identified the MacTavish chiefly descent and wrote to the Lord Lyon King of Arms, initiating the process that eventually led to the restoration of the Clan MacTavish chiefship in 1997.

== Bibliography ==
- Hargrave, Letitia Mactavish (1947). Margaret MacLeod (ed.). Letters of Letitia Hargrave. Champlain Society.
