= St. Laurent Ferry =

Coordinates: 52.836°N 106.094°W

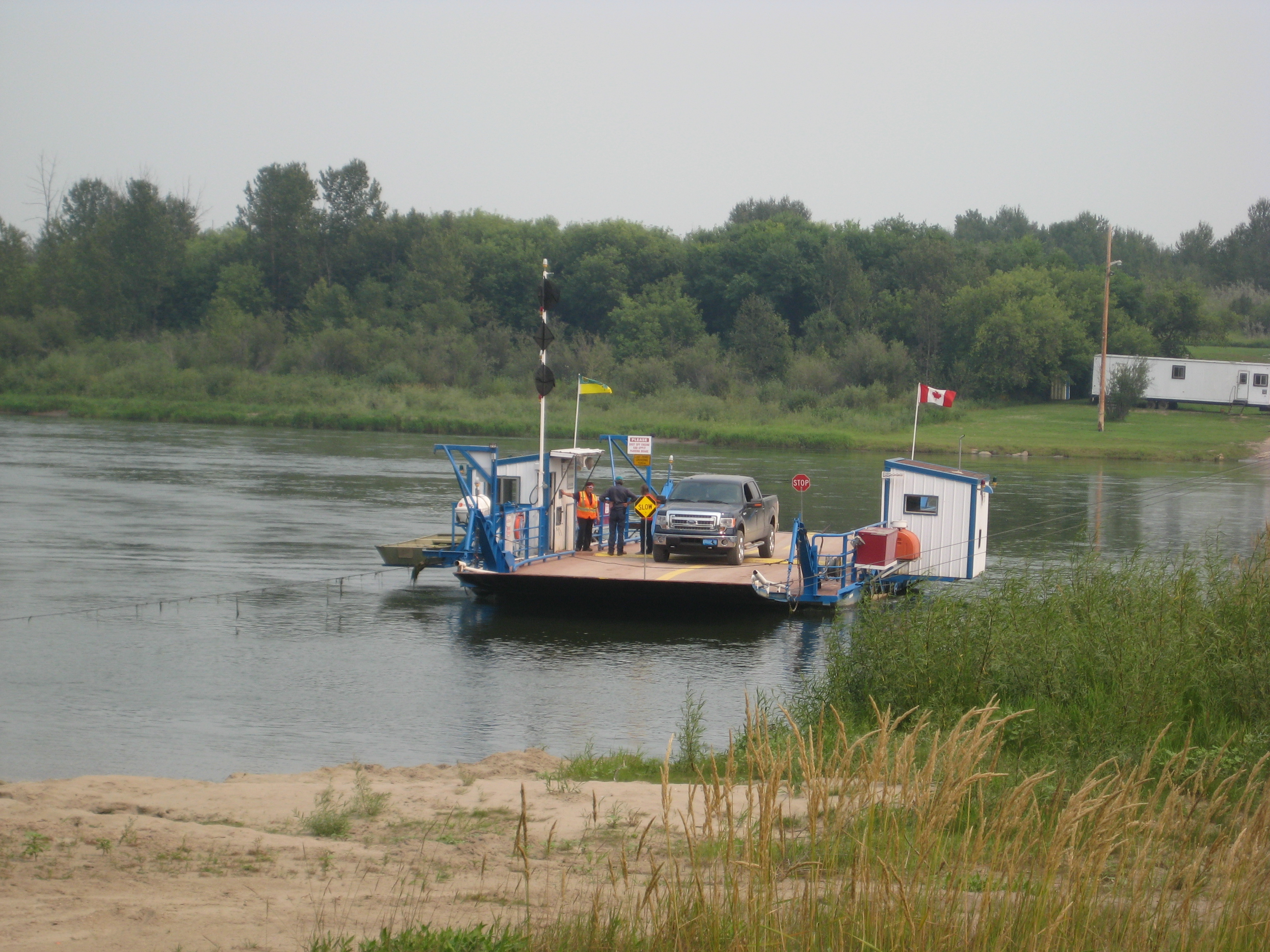
The St. Laurent Ferry

The St. Laurent Ferry is a cable ferry in the Canadian province of Saskatchewan. The ferry crosses the South Saskatchewan River, linking Grid Road 783 on the river's west bank with Grid Road 782 on the east bank, near St. Laurent de Grandin.

The six-car ferry is operated by the Saskatchewan Ministry of Highways and Infrastructure. The ferry is free of tolls and operates between 6:30 AM and 11:30 PM, during the ice-free season. The ferry has a length of 18.2 metres (60 ft), a width of 6 metres (20 ft), and a load limit of 31.5 tonnes (31.0 long tons; 34.7 short tons).

The ferry transports almost 18,000 vehicles a year.

== See also ==
- List of crossings of the South Saskatchewan River
