= James Hargreaves (English cricketer) =

American-born English cricketer and sports retailer

Personal information
- Full name: James Henry Hargreaves
- Born: 1859; New York City, New York, United States
- Died: 11 April 1922 (aged 62–63); Portsmouth, Hampshire, England
- Batting: Unknown

Domestic team information
- Years: Team
- 1884–1885: Hampshire

Career statistics
Competition	First-class
Matches	2
Runs scored	15
Batting average	3.75
100s/50s	–/–
Top score	14
Catches/stumpings	–/–
- Source: Cricinfo, 18 January 2010

James Henry Hargreaves (1859 – 11 April 1922) was an American-born English first-class cricketer and sports retailer.

Hargreaves was born in New York City in 1859. He later moved to England, where he played two first-class matches for Hampshire against Sussex at Hove in 1884, and Surrey at Southampton in 1885. In these matches, he scored 15 runs with a highest score of 14. In addition to playing cricket, he also played rugby union for Hampshire. He was better known in Portsmouth as a sports retailer and the founder of the sports outfitter Hargreaves, which he founded at Old Portsmouth in 1894. The business later expanded to 66 stores and remained under the ownership of the Hargreaves family until 2006, when it was purchased by Mike Ashley's Sports World group. Hargreaves died at Portsmouth in April 1922.
