= Josh Hargreaves =

English footballer

Personal information
- Full name: Joshua Hargreaves
- Date of birth: 8 January 1870
- Place of birth: Blackburn, England
- Date of death: 1954 (aged 83–84)
- Position: Centre forward

Senior career*
Years	Team	Apps	(Gls)
1891–1892	Blackburn Rovers	0	(0)
1892–1893	Northwich Victoria	14	(1)
1893–1897	Blackburn Rovers	52	(18)
1897–1901	New Brighton Tower	90	(26)
1897–1898	→ Blackburn Rovers (loan)	2	(1)
1902	Accrington Stanley		
Total		158	(46)
- * Club domestic league appearances and goals

Joshua Hargreaves (8 January 1870 – 1954) was an English footballer who played in the Football League for Blackburn Rovers, New Brighton Tower and Northwich Victoria.
