= Hargreave =

Hargreave may refer to:

- Charles James Hargreave (1820–1866), English judge and mathematician
- Sam Hargreave (1875–1929), English cricketer

== See also ==
- Hargreaves (surname)
- Hargrave (surname)
