= Christopher Hargrave =

Australian cricketer (born 1951)

Personal information
- Full name: Christopher George Hargrave
- Born: 31 August 1951 (age 75); Kiveton Park, Yorkshire, England
- Batting: Right-handed
- Role: Wicket-keeper

Domestic team information
- Years: Team
- 1976/77–1980/81: Tasmania

Career statistics
Competition	First-class
Matches	5
Runs scored	65
Batting average	9.28
100s/50s	0/0
Top score	24
Balls bowled	8
Wickets	0
Bowling average	–
5 wickets in innings	–
10 wickets in match	–
Best bowling	–
Catches/stumpings	3/1
- Source: CricketArchive, 5 November 2010

Christopher George Hargrave (born 31 August 1951) was an English-born cricketer who moved to Australia and played first-class cricket for Tasmania. He was a right-handed batsman and wicket-keeper who played five times for the side between 1976–77 and 1980–81.
