= Anne Hargreaves =

British missionary educator

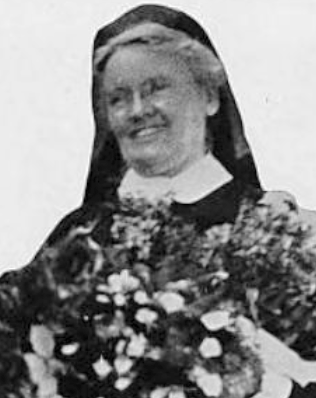
- Anne Hargreaves, from a 1922 publication
- Born: Anne Hayward; 1870; Bury, Greater Manchester, UK
- Died: September 6, 1923 (aged 52–53); Manila, Philippines
- Occupations: Missionary educator, deaconess
- Known for: Started a girls' school in the Besao Mountains

Anne Hayward Hargreaves (1870 – September 6, 1923) was an English-born educator who was an Anglican missionary deaconess in the Philippines. She promoted and ran schools in the Cordillera region.

== Early life ==
Anne Hayward was born in Bury, Greater Manchester, the daughter of Robert Hayward. She lived in New York City as a young woman.

== Career ==
Hargreaves became an Anglican missionary in widowhood. "The thing that made the greatest impression upon me was the absolute nakedness of the people," she recalled in 1922, "not because of the civilized idea of its immodesty, but because of the suffering of the people." She was headmistress of the Easter School in Baguio City in 1907, and made the school co-education in 1909, when she opened a girls' vocational weaving course. She arrived in Besao in 1912 and started St. James' School, a girls' school. She lectured on her work to church groups, and took a course at the New York Training School for Deaconesses, while she was on furlough in the United States in 1911–1912, 1917, and 1922. Her presentations included costumes and stereopticon views of her mission region.

== Personal life and legacy ==
Anne Hayward married Alfred Hargreaves in Tottington in 1894, and moved with him to New York City. He died in 1905, at age 35. She died in September 1923, in Manila, at the age of 53. Her grave is in Besao.

A church was built in Besao in 1926 and named St. Anne's Church in her memory. The Easter Weaving Room she opened in 1909 is still (as of 2012) a working and historic site in Baguio, producing and selling traditional Igorot handicrafts under the auspices of the Episcopal Diocese of North Central Philippines.
