= Hargraves =

Hargraves is a surname. Notable people with the surname include:

- Daniel Hargraves (born 1975), Australian rules footballer
- Edward Hargraves (1816–1891), gold prospector in Australia
- Fred Hargraves (1880–1917), English footballer
- James Hargraves (1690–1741), English Anglican divine who became the Dean of Chichester Cathedral in 1739
- Orin Hargraves (born 1953), American lexicographer
- Paul E. Hargraves (born 1941), a phycologist using the standard author abbreviation of Hargraves
- Peter Hargraves (born 1972), American retired sprinter
- Robert B. Hargraves (1928–2003), geologist

== See also ==
- Hargraves, Martian crater, named after Robert B. Hargraves
- Hargrave (surname)
