= Joseph James Hargrave =

Joseph James Hargrave FRGS
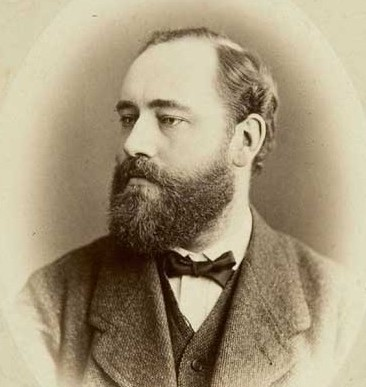
- Born: 1 April 1841; York Factory, Rupert's Land
- Died: 22 February 1894 (aged 52); Edinburgh, Scotland
- Education: Madras College
- Occupations: Fur trader, author, journalist
- Employer: Hudson's Bay Company
- Parents: James Hargrave; Letitia MacTavish

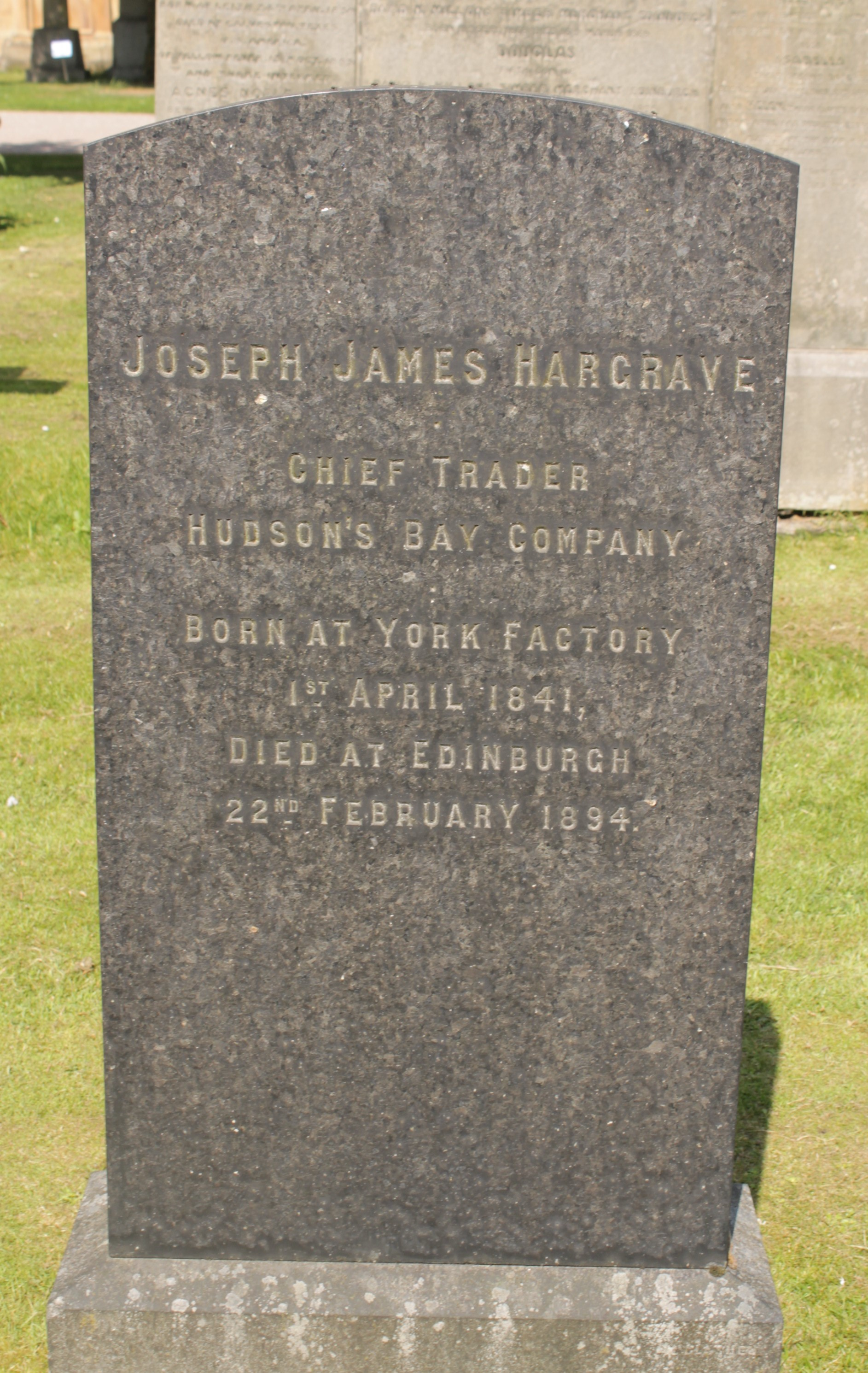
The grave of Joseph James Hargrave, Dean Cemetery

Joseph James Hargrave FRGS (1 April 1841 – 22 February 1894) was a Hudson's Bay Company fur trader, author, and journalist.

== Biography ==
Joseph James Hargrave was born and raised at York Factory, a fur trading post on Hudson Bay. He was the oldest son of York Factory's Chief Trader James Hargrave and his wife Letitia MacTavish Hargrave. His family took him to Scotland in 1846, where he studied at Madras College, St. Andrews, and completed his studies as a surveyor in 1859.

=== Hudson's Bay Company ===
Hargrave returned to North America in 1861 and became an apprentice clerk for the HBC, and a secretary to his uncle William Mactavish—the governor of Rupert's Land and Assiniboia. In 1869, he began writing a series of articles for the Montreal Herald about the anticipated transfer of land from the HBC to Canada.

In 1871, his book Red River was published. It describes the history of the Red River Colony prior to the Red River Rebellion of Louis Riel.

Before his retirement, he became a chief trader in the HBC. He died in 1894, shortly after returning to Edinburgh. He is buried in Dean Cemetery in west Edinburgh. The grave lies in the south-east section.

== Bibliography ==
- Makahonuk, Glen (1990). "Hargrave, Joseph James". In Halpenny, Francess G. (ed.). Dictionary of Canadian Biography. Vol. XII (1891–1900) (online ed.). University of Toronto Press.
