= Rural Municipality of St. François Xavier =

Rural municipality in Manitoba, Canada

St. François Xavier
- Rural municipality
- Rural Municipality of St. François Xavier
- The statue of the White Horse describing the legend and the meaning behind the name White Horse Plains.

- Location of St. François Xavier in Manitoba
- Coordinates: 49°59′25″N 97°40′20″W
- Country: Canada
- Province: Manitoba
- Region: Central Plains and Winnipeg Metro
- First settled: 1824
- Incorporated as a municipality: February 14, 1880; 146 years ago
- Founder: Cuthbert Grant
- Named for: Francis Xavier

Government
  - Type: Reeve–council
  - Reeve: Rick Van Wyk

Area
  - Land: 204.56 km^{2} (78.98 sq mi)
  - Metro: 5,306.79 km^{2} (2,048.96 sq mi)
- Elevation: 242 m (794 ft)

Population (2016 Census)
  - Rural municipality: 1,411
  - Density: 6.9/km^{2} (18/sq mi)
  - Metro: 778,489
- Time zone: UTC-6 (CST)
  - Summer (DST): UTC-5 (CDT)
- Website: rm-stfrancois.mb.ca

The Rural Municipality of St. François Xavier is a rural municipality (RM) in Manitoba, Canada, lying west-northwest of Winnipeg. It is part of the Central Plains Region as well as the Winnipeg Metro Region. It had a population of 1,411 in the 2016 census.

It is home to the community of St. François Xavier, the second-oldest settlement in Manitoba.

== History ==
The area around current-day St. François, commonly known as White Horse Plain (named after a local legend; French: La Prairie du Cheval Blanc), was inhabited by First Nations peoples such as the Cree and Sioux. Around 1824, Métis leader Cuthbert Grant received a land grant on White Horse Plain and founded a settlement. He was soon joined by a number of Métis families. The settlement was originally called Grantown.

In 1828, the Parish of St. François Xavier (named for St. François-Xavier) was established at White Horse Plain by priests from the mission at Saint-Boniface as the second parish in the North West. The Grantown settlement subsequently took its name from the parish, and St. François Xavier became a municipality in 1880.

The focal point for the municipality was the community of St. François Xavier, which was established in 1824 by Reverend Father Boucher.

The present St. Francois Xavier Roman Catholic Church was designed by former St. Francois Xavier architect Joseph-Azarie Senecal.

The Grey Nuns also had an educational and religious presence in the area for 118 years, ending their involvement in 1968 after their nunnery fell into disrepair.

== Demographics ==
In the 2021 Census of Population conducted by Statistics Canada, St. François Xavier had a population of 1,449 living in 494 of its 514 total private dwellings, a change of 2.7% from its 2016 population of 1,411. With a land area of 205.14 km^{2} (79.20 sq mi), it had a population density of 7.1/km^{2} (18.3/sq mi) in 2021.

== Notable people ==
- Cuthbert Grant — a Métis leader
- Pascal Breland — a Métis political leader, landowner, and negotiator
- Patrice Breland — reeve for the RM of St. François Xavier from 1891 to 1892 and from 1895 to 1900
- Pierre Falcon — a Métis songwriter

== See also ==
- List of francophone communities in Manitoba
- St. François Xavier Airport
