= William Coltman (disambiguation) =

William Coltman (1891–1974) was an English recipient of the Victoria Cross.

William Coltman may also refer to:

- William Coltman (mayor) (1862–1940), New Zealand local politician
- William Bachelor Coltman (died 1826), Canadian merchant and legislator
