= Pemmican Proclamation =

Executive order in Scotland (1814)

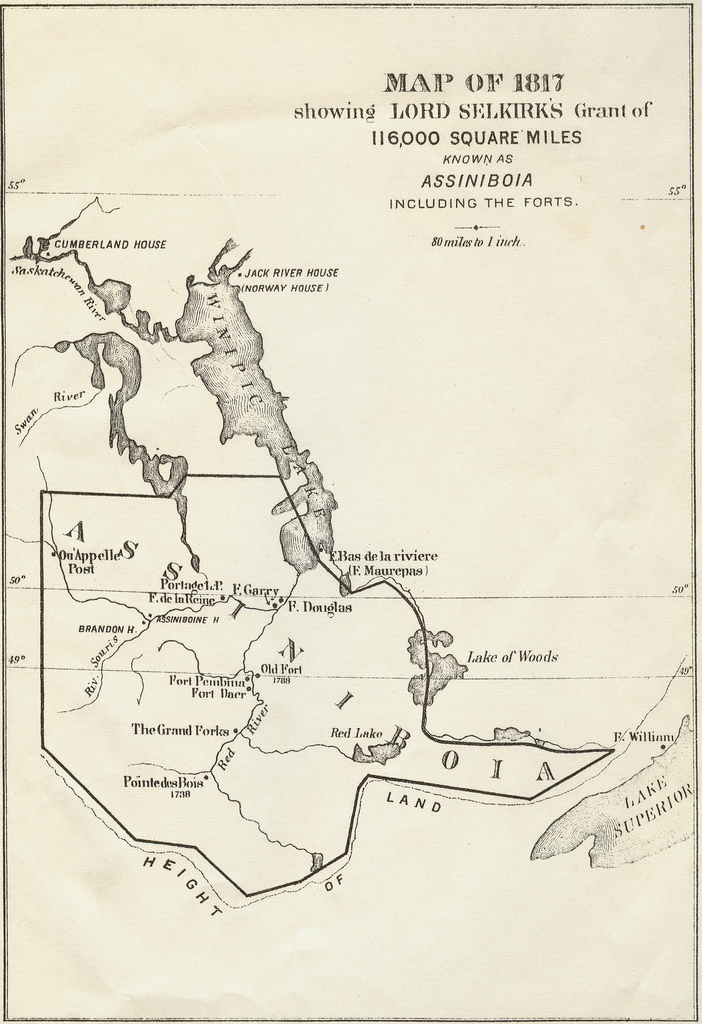
Selkirk's land grant (Assiniboia)

In January 1814, Governor Miles MacDonell, appointed by Thomas Douglas, 5th Earl of Selkirk issued to the inhabitants of the Red River area a proclamation which became known as the Pemmican Proclamation. The proclamation was issued in attempt to stop the Métis people from exporting pemmican out of the Red River district. Cuthbert Grant, leader of the Métis, disregarded MacDonell's proclamation and continued the exportation of pemmican to the North West Company. The proclamation overall, became one of many areas of conflict between the Métis and the Red River settlers. Thomas Douglas, 5th Earl of Selkirk had sought interest in the Red River District, with the help of the Hudson's Bay Company as early as 1807. However, it was not until 1810 that the Hudson's Bay Company asked Lord Selkirk for his plans on settling in the interior of Canada.

The Red River Colony or the Selkirk Settlement included portions of present-day southern Manitoba, northern Minnesota and eastern North Dakota, in addition to small parts of eastern Saskatchewan, northwestern Ontario and northeastern South Dakota.

== Synopsis ==
The Proclamation defined the borders of the lands ceded to Lord Selkirk by the Hudson's Bay Company over which Miles MacDonell had been appointed Governor.

The proclamation next outlined the reasons and the means by which the governor would control the flow of food, mostly pemmican from the area.

== Sources ==
The Proclamation was submitted as evidence during the Pemmican War Trials held in Montreal in 1818. and published in the: Report of trials in the courts of Canada, relative to the destruction of the Earl of Selkirk's settlement on the Red River With observations (p. 61-62) by Amos Andrew in 1820.

== The Proclamation ==
"Whereas the Governor and Company of Hudson's Bay, have ceded to the Right Honourable Thomas Earl of Selkirk, his heirs and successors, for ever, all that tract of land or territory, bounded by a line running as follows, viz:--Beginning on the western shore of the Lake Winnipic, at a point in fifty-two degrees and thirty minutes north latitude; and thence running due west to the Lake Winipigashish, otherwise called Little Winnipic; then in a southerly direction through the said lake, so as to strike its western shore in latitude fifty-two degrees; then due west to the place where the parallel of fifty-two degrees north latitude, intersects the western branch of Red River, otherwise called Ossiniboine River; then due south from that point of intersection to the height of land which separates the waters running into Hudson's Bay from those of the Mississouri and Mississippi Rivers; then in an easterly direction along the height of land to the source of the River Winnipic, (meaning by such last named river the principal branch of the waters which unite in the Lake Ságinagas,) thence along the main stream of those waters and the middle of the several lakes through which they pass, to the mouth of the Winnipic River; and thence in a northerly direction through the middle of the Lake Winnipic, to the place of beginning. Which territory is called Ossiniboia, and of which I, the undersigned, have been duly appointed Governor.

And whereas, the welfare of the families, at present forming Settlements on the Red River, within the said Territory, with those on the way to it, passing the winter at York and Churchill Forts in Hudson's Bay; as also those who are expected to arrive next autumn; renders it a nece-sary and indispensable part of my duty to provide for their support; in the yet uncultivated state of the country, the ordinary resources derived from the buffalo and other wild animals hunted within the Territory, are not deemed more than adequate for the requisite supply. Wherefore, it is hereby ordered, that no persons trading in furs or provisions within the Territory, for the Honourable Hudson’s Bay Company, or the North-West Company, or any individual, or unconnected traders or persons whatever, shall take out any provisions, either of flesh, fish, grain, or vegetable, procured or raised within the Territory, by water or land carriage, for one twelvemonth from the date hereof; save and except what may be judged necessary for the trading parties at this present time within the Territory, to carry them to their respective destinations; and who may, on due application to me, obtain a license for the same. The provisions procured and raised as above shall be taken for the use of the colony; and that no loss may accrue to the parties concerned, they will be paid for by British bills at the customary rates. And be it hereby further made known, that whosoever shall be detected in attempting to convey out, or shall aid and assist in carrying out, or attempting to carry out, any provisions prohibited as above, either by water or land, shall be taken into custody, and prosecuted as the laws in such cases direct; and the provisions so taken, as well as any goods and chattels, of what nature soever, which may be taken along with them, and also the craft, carriages and cattle instrumental in conveying away the same to any part, but to the Settlement on Red River, shall be forfeited.

Given under my hand at Fort Daer, (Pembina,) the 8th day of January, 1814.

(Signed) . MILES MACDONELL, Governor

By order of the Governor,

(Signed) . John Spencer, Secretary."

== Background ==
“In order to expand their food supply, fur companies traded large quantities of dried bison meat and fat in fall and early winter to produce at their posts blocks of pemmican (pronounced “pimigan” in the Cree), a word meaning “he makes grease.” An energy-rich, cheap food source, pemmican consisted of pounded dried meat, soft fat (unsaturated fats derived from bone marrow) and hard fat (saturated fats taken from body fat and converted into tallow), bosses (fatty hump meat), and/or dépouille (strips of fat that lay along the spine of the animal). Although Indians produced some pemmican and traded it directly to European posts, more commonly, British commerce came to depend on pemmican mass-produced by Europeans at their own posts.”

Pemmican became the main source of food throughout the Bison trade nearing the end of the eighteenth century. The Hudson’s Bay Company relied on the food to provide a source of energy for their fur-traders who had relocated to areas that had a scarce food supply but plenty of fur. By the mid-1790s the first systems of small wintering posts had become massive food depots, with Montreal companies organizing depots in the Red River Valley. The Hudson’s Bay Company grew concerned during the turn of the century because their rival, the North West Company, was providing trappers in the north with enough Pemmican to allow them to specialize their hunting patterns to cater to the English trading posts rather than the HBC.

“ The impact of the European factory system on traditional pemmican production has yet to be fully studied, especially at carryover places and between watersheds where large communities of indigenous people gathered. Indeed, it became so commonplace for woodland hunters to visit and even inhabit trade routes and major transshipment points where they might gain access to the plains-trade pemmican stockpiled there that the HBC eventually outlawed its crews from making such exchanges and sternly rebuked traders who made it available around their posts.”

The early nineteenth century saw competition increase between food trading companies in and around the Red River settlement. This led to a steep increase in Pemmican prices, which would become a problem in 1811 when winter conditions became extremely harsh. By 1813, companies instructed their traders to offer Native hunters “extraordinary payment” for hunting beyond their specific provisions.

“Competition over the trade, poor winters, and hunters burning the plains escalated prices and, in the end, contributed to one of Rupert’s Land’s more chaotic turns in 1814 with the advent of the “Pemmican Wars”—where the Selkirk settlers, under the Pemmican Proclamation, attempted to regulate and control pemmican production by rival companies.21 This very issue sparked the bloody Battle of Seven Oaks in 1816: Métis clashed with settlers who had earlier seized and now competed for the high-priced food supplies of the NWC coming from the Assiniboine River.”

A major contributor to the controversy surrounding the Red River Settlement was the purchasing of Hudson’s Bay Company shares by Thomas Douglas, the 5th Lord of Selkirk. Douglas, in an attempt to provide new opportunities for Scottish settlers, purchased enough shares from the HBC to be granted a large land settlement in the Red River. Conflict arose from the situation because not only was Douglas granted a massive chunk of the Red River Settlement but he did not want trade to profit the rival North West Company, which led to the Lord of Selkirk cutting off the Metis inhabiting the Red River colony and interfering with NWC trade routes. The harsh living conditions and scarcity of food would eventually lead to Douglas’ reliance on the Metis and the introduction of the Pemmican Proclamation, considering the ties he had severed with those he now depended on in the area.

The Proclamation was submitted as evidence during the Pemmican War Trials held in Montreal in 1818. and published in the: Report of trials in the courts of Canada, relative to the destruction of the Earl of Selkirk's settlement on the Red River With observations (p. 61-62) by Amos Andrew in 1820.

== Pemmican Trade ==
For the settlers living near the Red River on the edge of the prairie, the Pemmican Trade was an important source of trade for the Red River Valley, almost comparable to what the beaver-pelt trade did for the Natives farther north. This trade was a major factor in the emergence of a distinct Métis society. Pemmican was made of dried buffalo meat pounded into a powder and mixed with melted buffalo fat in leather bags. Packs of pemmican would be shipped north and stored at the major fur posts. Ultimately, the Pemmican trade began to establish its position within the Red River and other parts of the prairies, the Hudson's Bay Company (HBC), and North West Company (NWC).

To procure pemmican in sufficient quantities, the HBC and NWC traded for it at several outposts in the Red River District and shipped it to their Bas de la Rivière depot on Lake Winnipeg where it was distributed to brigades of north canoes passing between Fort William and Athabasca or transported to Fort William where it was issued to brigades going to the company's eastern and southern districts. The majority of the NWC's pemmican was purchased from the local Métis and to a lesser degree from the local First Nations people and freemen. The pemmican, which forms the staple article of produce from the summer hunt, is a species of food peculiar to Rupert's Land. It is composed of buffalo meat, dried and pounded fine, and mixed with an amount of tallow or buffalo fat equal to itself in bulk. The tallow having been boiled, is poured hot from the caldron into an oblongbag, manufactured from the buffalo hide, into which the pounded meat has previously been placed. The contents are then stirred together until they have been thoroughly well mixed. When full, the bag is sewed up and laid in store. Each bag when full weighs one hundred pounds. It is calculated that, on an average, the carcass of each buffalo will yield enough pemmican to fill one bag

Ultimately, the pemmican trade was a major factor for the expanding provisions that were being streamlined and developed within the Red River Area, as well as Winnipeg and other parts of the Prairies located between Manitoba and Saskatchewan. The two Major trading companies which were the Hudson's Bay Company and North-West Company began establishing various territories and boundaries where they could exercise the Pemmican trade. Both the HBC and the NWC needed to establish their trade routes in the area to secure the economic benefits of Pemmican. Therefore, the need to establish a trade route led to conflict between the Hudson's Bay Company and the North West Company that erupted in 1812.

"In 1812, the Hudson’s Bay Company established the Selkirk agricultural colony on the banks of the Red River. This posed a strategic threat to the North West Company since the colony lay astride its provision supply line in that quarter. The seriousness of the danger was manifest in the winter of 1814. The colony was seriously short of provisions."

The need for the North West Company and Hudson's Bay Company to establish a suitable route of transportation for the Pemmican trade would be vital in securing economic prosperity. The Red River was beginning to see an increase in settlements and trading posts erecting in the area, as the Red River served as a vital mode of transportation. The NWC had previously built a strong relationship with the Metis, and ultimately the NWC positioned themselves as defenders of the Natives and Métis, and thus became opponents of the HBC colonization scheme that would illegally dispossess the native peoples. Furthermore, it was vital for these companies to secure an alliance when trading Pemmican because the native expertise in buffalo hunting would serve as the most productive way obtaining Pemmican ingredients. Also, since there had been a food shortage in these areas since 1776, Pemmican became a prominent source of food in the Red River settlements. Pemmican would be an important food source during the winter months and would serve as an offset or back-up to inconsistent crop-growth within settlements. With the food shortage however came an increase in the price and trade of Pemmican.

"In such circumstances, Indian suppliers drove up prices on provisions offered to Europeans. While volumes increased to meet European demands by the turn of the century, so did the traded value, or price, of these commodities, especially in areas hard hit by changing game conditions. In 1801 intense local competition between traders raised prices overall. Lower Red River outfits, by then supplying massive amounts of food to the trading companies, priced depot pemmican at an astronomical shilling per pound—in better circumstances, Europeans could get it for a quarter or less than that".

The increased price of Pemmican, combined with the food shortage and tensions between the settlement of HBC and NWC territories ultimately developed into conflict. Tensions erupted in the end, which contributed to one of Rupert's Land more chaotic turns in 1814 with “The Pemmican Proclamation,” which attempted to regulate and control pemmican production by rival companies. This very issue sparked the bloody Battle of Seven Oaks in 1816, which saw the Métis clash with settlers who had earlier seized and now competed for the high-priced food supplies of the NWC coming from the Assiniboine River.

== Impact of the Pemmican Proclamation (The Pemmican War) ==
The Pemmican Proclamation was a key factor in the onslaught of the Pemmican War that took place from 1812-1821. During the Pemmican War, the Métis suffered immensely and had a tough time legally hunting for food. Carolyn Podruchny, author of the book Contours of People: Metis Family, Mobility and History notes the Metis struggled to during the Pemmican War to survive stating “ the Winter of 1814-15 was a difficult one as the Metis buffalo hunters were increasingly hostile to the colony”.

One of the many issues which arose during the Pemmican Proclamation was the Battle of Seven Oaks. The Pemmican War worsened the relationship of white European settlers in Canada and the Metis. Lyle Dick, author of the article “The Seven Oaks Incident and the Construction of a Historical Tradition, 1860-1970”, notes the Seven Oaks Incident of 1816 was a direct result of the Pemmican War. Dick further suggest the Pemmican War played a minor role in motivating the Red River Rebellion of 1870. The Seven Oaks Incident occurred on June 1816, as a violent clash took place between a group of Hudson Bay Company Officers and Selkirk Settlers vs. a party of Metis traders from the Red River and the Upper Assiniboine.

Currently in Canada, there is a large debate to as who instigated the Seven Oaks Incident. Lyle Dick notes that reportedly, the first shot was fired by the Metis, however Contemporary Commissioner William Bachelor Coltman was sent by lower Canada (which is Now Quebec) to investigate the dispute between HBC/Selkirk settlers and the Metis, and came to a different conclusion. Commissioner Coltman stated the first shot was fired by the HBC/ Selkirk Settlers, and the Metis most likely reacted in self defense. The aftermath of the confrontation between the two groups left The HBC/ Selkirk Settlers with 21 deaths and one survivor, whereas the Metis only had one man killed. Robert Semple, Governor of Assiniboia was killed in the gunfire. Which group fired the first shot is still a debated subject among scholars, however Lyle Dick notes it has been dubbed “The Seven Oaks Massacre” by scholar of the time period George Bryce in 1870. The notion the Battle of Seven Oaks was a massacre was a new “master narrative” of Western progress in 1870, which depicts Metis as savage villains, and white European settlers as the unanimous hero or victim.

The Pemmican Proclamation was a main reason the Battle of Seven Oaks to take place and is one of many confrontations between the Metis and white settler Europeans. The Pemmican Proclamation also led to European's control of the pemmican market in the 1820s. The price of pemmican during the Pemmican War was kept low until small amounts of buffalo or meat could be found, when pemmican prices would grow causing many issues for Metis. George Coltpitts, author of the article “ Market Economies in the British Buffalo Commons in the Early Nineteenth Century”, notes these changes stating “In the earlier provisions trade, local Indian hunters clearly controlled the hunt and the price of provisions on the market. Indians demanded ever-higher prices from British traders for their products, including dried meats, fats, and pemmican. But with the amalgamation of British fur trade companies in 1821, almost all plains hunters inhabiting the large territories of the Blackfoot Nations (Kainai, Siksika, and Piikani), the Atsina (Gros Ventre), the Assiniboine-Nakota, and the Plains Cree lost bargaining power to a consolidated and systematic provisions buyer.

By the 1830s, pemmican cost the equivalent of 2 pence per pound (d/lb), a price at least four times lower than it had been three decades earlier. Prices remained remarkably low across vast stretches of the British North American territories and stayed that way until the depleted herds could no longer feed the thousands of indigenous people and newcomers dependent upon them. Occasionally, regional game depletion or bad hunting weather limited the supply of raw materials needed to make pemmican; short supply tipped the market advantage to the Indians, who raised prices to meet increasing demand for their products. But by the late 1820s, HBC managers developed a standing order system and a region-wide buying strategy that stabilized the market and significantly undermined Indian bargaining power. The HBC in turn enjoyed an enviable advantage as a consumer of pemmican; it progressively enlarged its purchases and use of this cheapened energy source”. The Pemmican Proclamation caused many issues for the Metis and aboriginal population of Canada for many years after its legislation was passed.

During the late 1790s and heading into the turn of the century, pemmican became a leading source of food throughout the fur trading monopolies. This transition to pemmican began because it was a source of energy that could be stored and preserved for long periods of time, which allowed fur traders to venture beyond designated areas to find game because of this new unspoiled food. From first establishing small food systems to organizing massive food depots, companies began to realize that they could heavily profit from an entirely European run production of pemmican. A major step towards this transition to a European system was the involvement of Thomas Douglas, 5th Lord of Selkirk. Douglas had a strong desire to relocate poor Scottish immigrants to profitable land settlements. The Red River and the pemmican industry would have been perfect for the Lord of Selkirk and his colonizers because Douglas had used his fortune to purchase enough HBC shares to be granted land in the Red River Settlement. This meant the Lord of Selkirk's men (he promised 200 annually to the HBC) could take over the pemmican production, stop the Metis from supplying the NWC, and interrupt fur trades routes of rival company trappers. He did not plan for the extreme weather conditions and scarcity of food because of said conditions that would come in the years of 1811-1813. This would lead to the settlers’ dependence on the Metis for survival and the Pemmican Proclamation that would ban the export of pemmican from the Red River Settlement to avoid starvation. This would be the beginnings of the Pemmican War that would ensue shortly after.

== See also ==
- Pemmican War
- Battle of Seven Oaks
- Métis buffalo hunting#Pemmican trade
