= Patrice Breland =

Canadian politician and fur trader

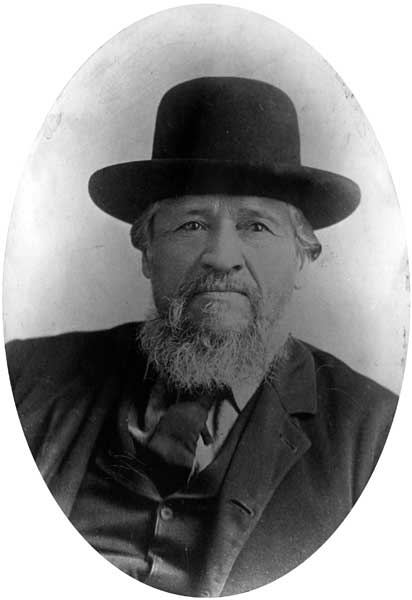

Legislative Assembly of Manitoba
- In office 1879–1883

Personal details
- Born: Patrice Breland; 17 March 1837 St. Francois Xavier
- Died: 3 April 1908 (aged 71)
- Spouse: Helen Dease
- Relations: Cuthbert Grant (maternal grandfather)
- Parent: Pascal Breland

Patrice Breland (March 17, 1837 – April 3, 1908) was a fur trader and political figure in Manitoba. He represented St. Francois Xavier from 1879 to 1883 in the Legislative Assembly of Manitoba as a Conservative.

He was born in St. François Xavier, Manitoba, the son of Pascal Breland and Maria Grant. He was the grandson of Cuthbert Grant. Patrice was one of the many who signed the Cypress Hills Métis Hunting Brigade Petition in 1878. He was a justice of the peace for the North West Territories and served as reeve for the Rural Municipality of St. François Xavier from 1891 to 1892 and from 1895 to 1900.

== Personal life ==
Patrice Breland was born in St. François Xavier, Manitoba, on 17 March 1837, to French-Métis leader and government diplomat Pascal Breland and Maria Grant. Maria Grant, daughter of Cuthbert Grant, came from a wealthy family; Pascal became a very wealthy man due to all that he inherited after the passing of Cuthbert Grant in 1854.

In 1863, Patrice married Helen Dease, with whom he had several children. According to the Manitoba Historical Society, the two had 7 children: Tobie, Alexandre, Alfred, Dolphis, Edmond, Josephine, and Virginia; however, an article by Lawrence J. Barkwell claims that the two had 11 children: Marie Rose, Marguerite, Patrice Tobie, Lucie, Emelie, Virginie, Marie Alexandre, Alfred, Patrice, Josephine, and Joseph Edmund.

Breland died in St. François Xavier at the age of 71.

== Political career ==
Patrice was one of the many who signed the Cypress Hills Métis Hunting Brigade Petition in 1878. He was also a justice of the peace for the North West Territories and served as reeve for the Rural Municipality of St. François Xavier from 1891 to 1892 and from 1895 to 1900.

=== Manitoba Act ===
During the time of the creation of the Manitoba Act, the Legislative Assembly of Assiniboia was deciding between a unicameral or bicameral style of government. Decisions were leaning towards a bicameral-style government. After leaving Fort Garry, the Manitoba Act continued to be in review and the idea of having a Senate was discussed. Throughout this discussion of a Senate, a possible structure and possible candidates were mentioned. Breland was amongst the list of possible candidates for the Senate.

== See also ==
- Legislative Assembly of Manitoba
- Cuthbert Grant
