= Thomas Hall Coltman =

New Zealand jeweller

- Thomas Hall Coltman in the 1930s
- Born: 1860; Coventry, England
- Died: 3 July 1937 (aged 77); Wellington, New Zealand
- Resting place: Karori Cemetery
- Occupations: Watchmaker; jeweller
- Spouse: Julia Mandl (m. 1887)
- Children: 2
- Parent(s): William Coltman; Maria Louisa Hall
- Relatives: William Coltman (brother); Liam Coltman (great-great-grandson)

Thomas Hall Coltman (1860 – 3 July 1937) was a New Zealand jeweller, watchmaker, and sports enthusiast.

== Biography ==
=== Early life ===
Thomas Hall Coltman was born in Coventry, Warwickshire in 1860, to William Coltman, a watchmaker and jeweller, and his wife Maria Louisa Coltman (née Hall). His parents had been married at Coventry, on 21 June 1857. Coltman was the eldest of ten children, with five brothers (William, Richard Hall, Robert Hall, George Edward, and Charles John), and four sisters (Mary Ann Hall, Priscilla, Hannah Maria Hall, and Emma) following. He spent most of his early life in England at his father’s jewellery store on Bradford Road, Dewsbury. He was educated as a watchmaker at Rotherham and Sons, in Coventry, and apprenticed there for seven years. In 1875, being an excellent swimmer and displaying a keen interest for all kinds of sport, he had the honour of partnering with Capt. Matthew Webb, the first person to swim the English Channel without the use of artificial aids. Coltman swam with Webb in his training, and accompanied and paced him in his final attempt across the Channel. Coltman was also an avid boxer.

When he was nineteen, Coltman boarded the iron clipper Hurunui, commanded by Capt. William Barclay. The ship was dispatched from London on 12 August 1879 with around 160 passengers. Coltman sailed to New Zealand as a steerage passenger, and landed at the Port of Lyttelton after nearly four months on 6 December 1879. The rest of his family also came to New Zealand in 1881 aboard the Waimate. Coltman first settled in Lincoln, and was already active as a member of the Lincoln Cricket Club within his first year in New Zealand. He moved to Geraldine for a short time, before moving again in 1885. During the gold rush to Ross, he traveled to the West Coast and settled in Revell St., Hokitika as a watchmaker and jeweller. At the time Hokitika was the centre of the gold mining industry on the West Coast. It was there on 14 February 1887 that he married Julia Mandl, the third daughter of Joseph Mandl, at St. Mary's vestry.

In December, 1890, Coltman moved to Wellington with his family and continued business as a watchmaker and jeweller at 26 Willis St.

=== Bankruptcy ===
In early August 1893, Coltman was insolvent, and was forced to appear before the court. The first published statement listed liabilities of £1,281 7s 8d against assets of £682, leaving a deficiency of £599 7s 8d. His assets included: Stock valued at £590; Furniture and fittings worth £62; Book debts of £30. All creditors were unsecured, with the largest being Joseph Mandl of Hokitika (£562 9s 9d), his father-in-law.

The case was brought before the Official Assignee James Ashcroft on 15 August 1893, who oversaw the liquidation of Coltman’s estate. Mandl, Coltman’s father‑in‑law, had lent him money as early as 1887 and stated that he never charged interest or demanded repayment. He offered creditors 10s 3d in the pound, meaning they would recover roughly half their claims. The Official Assignee suggested that Mandl instead purchase the business stock outright, valued at £646, to simplify the settlement. Mandl maintained that his offer was fair and that liquidation would yield less for creditors. The Official Assignee warned that rejecting the offer could lead to government fees and additional costs exceeding £400. Ultimately, Mandl agreed to consult with the Assignee to reach a resolution.

The next morning on 16 August, Mandl offered £275 for Coltman’s property, which would pay creditors a little over 6s in the pound. He stated that his motive was not personal gain but to close the estate efficiently. After discussion, the creditors voted to accept Mandl’s offer, and he withdrew his own claim as a creditor. The Official Assignee was instructed to proceed with Coltman’s discharge from bankruptcy. The Assignee noted that Coltman’s only fault was failing to disclose his financial relationship with Mandl, not any fraudulent conduct.

The final session on 25 September recorded that Mr. Justice William Richmond presided over a short sitting of the Bankruptcy Court and granted Coltman’s discharge. There was no opposition from creditors, and the judge advised Coltman to improve his bookkeeping should he resume business.

=== Career ===
Coltman stayed active in local affairs, as a good singer and sportsman. For a short time he attempted to resume his business at Willis St. before giving up business on 8 June 1895, and selling all his stock. For a time he took up work as a travelling representative for the National Mutual Life Association of Australasia, LTD. After nearly eleven years he started up shop again at 92 Cuba St. in 1906. He later shifted work to 183 Cuba St. On 29 March 1923 Coltman was formally appointed as a Justice of the Peace in Wellington. In 1927 he sold his business at Cuba St. and returned to life as a travelling insurance salesman.

=== Death and family ===
Coltman died on 3 July 1937 from heart failure at his residence on Willis St. He was vice-president of the Wellington Wrestling Association, a foundation member of the Maranui Surf and Life-Saving Club, and the donor of the Coltman Cup for inter-school swimming competition. Coltman and his wife had two children:

1. Annie Louisa Marian Coltman, b. 11 December 1887, Hokitika; d. 19 December 1956, Wellington.
2. Moritz Thomas St. Clair Coltman, b. 13 August 1889, Hokitika; d. 17 December 1969, Wellington.

He is the great-great-grandfather of New Zealand rugby union player Liam Coltman.
