= Pierriche =

Pierriche may refer to:

- Pierre Falcon
- Grande Pierriche and Petite Pierriche, tributaries of the Saint-Maurice River, Quebec, Canada
