= Robert Semple (fur trader) =

American-born fur trader and merchant

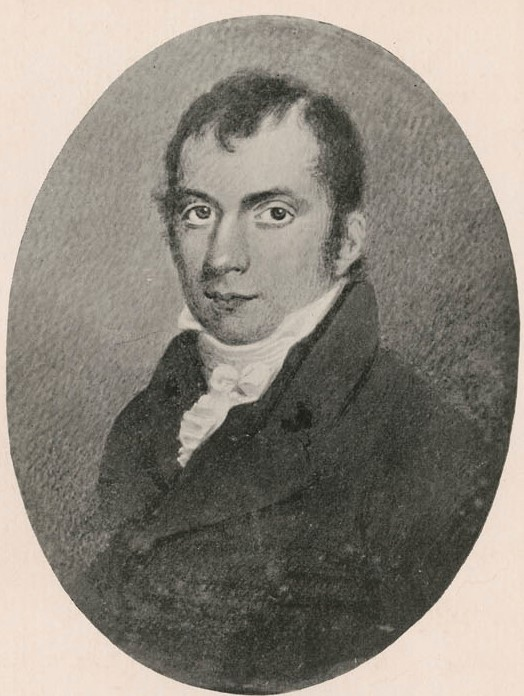
- Born: 26 February 1777; Boston, Massachusetts, US
- Died: 19 June 1816 (aged 39); Seven Oaks (Winnipeg, Manitoba)
- Cause of death: Shot
- Occupations: Governor of the territories owned By The Hudson's Bay Company (1815-1816); Fur trader; Businessman

Robert Semple (26 February 1777 – 19 June 1816) was an American-born fur trader and merchant who served as governor of the territories controlled by the Hudson's Bay Company in the Canadas from 1815 until his death in 1816.

== Background ==
Semple was born on 26 February 1777 in Boston, Mass. He was the son of Robert Semple, a prominent London merchant and Anne Greenlaw. Semple's parents were loyalists, and sometime during or after the American Revolution, the family returned to England.

Because he was not a British citizen, but an American, Semple was able to travel to many countries that British subjects would barred from entering due to wartime restrictions. During his travels he wrote travel books including Walks and sketches at the Cape of Good Hope; to which is subjoined a journey from Cape Town to Blettenberg's Bay (London, 1803); Observations on a journey through Spain and Italy to Naples; and thence to Smyrna and Constantinople: comprising a description of the principal places in that route, and remarks on the present natural and political state of those countries (2v., London, 1807); A second journey in Spain, in the spring of 1809; from Lisbon, through the western skirts of the Sierra Morena, to Sevilla, Cordoba, Granada, Malaga, and Gibraltar; and thence to Tetuan and Tangiers (London, 1809); Sketch of the present state of Caracas; including a journey from Caracas through La Victoria and Valencia to Puerto Cabello (London, 1812); and Observations made on a tour from Hamburg, through Berlin, Gorlitz, and Breslau, to Silberberg; and thence to Gottenburg (London, 1814). It is possible that it was while he was traveling that he met Thomas Douglas, the 5th Lord of Selkirk who appointed him as Governor of Assiniboia and Governor in chief of Rupert's Land. Semple began his position 12 April 1815 and was paid 1,500 pounds annually for his work. He then left for the Red River Settlement. It is not clear why Semple was given the position of governor.

== Red River Settlement ==
Selkirk's settlers first arrived at the Red River settlement in August 1812. The governor at this time was Miles Macdonell. Under the rule of Macdonell, the settlement had been attacked and destroyed by North West Company members. Due to this failure, Macdonell lost support. Red River Settlers were anxious for the arrival of Semple, who was expected to be much more popular than Macdonell.

At the age of 38, Semple landed at York Factory in August 1815 with other settlers. They had to journey from York to the Red River Settlement, which they arrived at on 3 November.

Lord Selkirk appointed Semple to be the governor of the territories owned by the Hudson's Bay Company. He controlled the land known as the Forks which consisted of Fort Douglas, Fort Gibraltar, and Seven Oaks. The committee meeting held, resolved to appoint Semple. However, there was no information provided in the minutes from the meeting as to why Semple was chosen for the position. He was not proven to be qualified for the position of governor.

=== Colin Robertson ===
Colin Robertson, was a member of the Hudson's Bay Company who helped rebuild the Red River Settlement prior to Semple's arrival. The two men had a complicated relationship. as Semple wanted to prove himself as master through his powerful decisions. Meanwhile, Robertson did not approve of many of the decisions that Semple was making. His disapproval led Robertson to leave the Settlement on 11 June 1816 and he intended to return to England. After Semple began achieving success and support, Robertson asked to return to the settlement, which Semple rejected.

=== Semple as Governor ===
Semple did many things in the first few years of being governor. During his first December at the settlement, he went to Fort Daer (Pembina, N.Dak) and visited settlers who had moved there for the winter due to a shortage of food. He then continued and visited all of the different posts on the upper Assiniboine and Qu'Appelle rivers that belonged to the Hudson's Bay Company. When he returned, Semple began to attack his neighbours, the North West Company and the Metis.

Controversy arose at the Red River settlement when on the tenth of June, 1816 Semple decided to attack and dismantle Fort Gibraltar, the Fort owned by the North West Company. After seizing the fort, Semple took all of the usable belongings and shipped them to Fort Douglas. Everything that was left he burned so that it could not be rebuilt by the North West Company. Colin Robertson disagreed with what Semple was doing and his means to prove a point. This was when Robertson decided that he would no longer support Semple as the governor and left the settlement. Semple's actions played a large role in the feud between the two men. The Metis also view the destruction of the fort with disgust, they saw the burning and dismantling of the Fort as an act of war. Due to Semple drastic measures, he essentially ensured no way for a peaceful settlement to occur between the Hudson's Bay Company, the North West Company, and the Metis.

After destroying Fort Gibraltar, Semple then took over the North West Company's post at Pembina on 23 March 1816. After another attack by the Hudson's Bay Company, the North West Company and the Metis who were all living in close proximity to Semples land, began to prepare for war. Cuthbert Grant, the leader of the Metis, wanted to take back Qu'appelle. They fought and took back the Brandon house from the Hudson's Bay Company on 1 June 1816.

== Seven Oaks ==
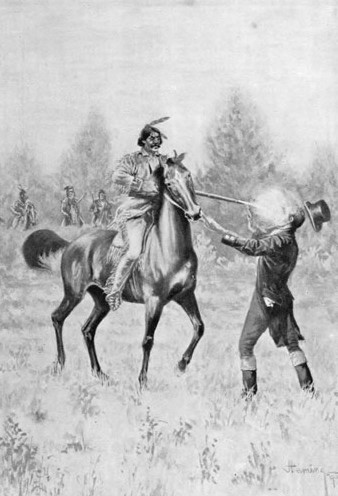
Semple getting shot

Seven Oaks was a clash between the Metis, North West Company members, and Selkirk settlers. The skirmish began when a man by the name of Moustouche Boutino let Semple know that Cuthbert Grant and his men had prepared for war, and wanted to take Semple as a prisoner. When Semple heard a few days later that a watchman at Fort Douglas had seen the Metis half a mile down, Semple asked 20 men to follow him to meet them. The men at Red River liked Semple, and were loyal to him. All of the men wanted to follow him, however they obeyed and limited their numbers to 20. Semple said he was not going to fight, and that he only wanted to ask them what the Metis wanted; meanwhile, his men that came were all given muskets, bayonets, as well as ball and powder. "In this discrepancy in Semple's actions lay the cause of the events of 19 July. He had no desire for a conflict, and much reason to avoid one, but his actions and his position made one most likely. "While Semple and his men were preparing to meet them, the Metis started to move away from Fort Douglas. However, instead of letting them pass, Semple insisted on meeting them.

The two groups met at close range, the Metis forming a semicircle, and the Selkirk settlers forming a line so that the Metis could not pass. At first, the Metis had 15 men whereas Semple had 24. However, other Metis and North West Company men were quick to arrive, and Semple was now outnumbered.

François-Firmin Boucher, a Canadian member of the North West Company, moved forward to speak with Semple. There are a few different versions of how the next events took place.

John Pritchard, an eyewitness, stated that when the two men met, they both asked the other what they wanted. Boucher finally told Semple, "We want our fort back". Semple fueled the Canadian's anger by telling him, "Then go get your fort" and reached to grab Boucher's gun.

Michael Heyden states that Boucher asked the governor, "Why did you destroy our fort, you damned rascal". Semple then went to grab Boucher's horse's reins and told his men to take Boucher as a prisoner.

It is not clear whether Semple was reaching for Boucher's gun, or his horse's bridle. But, while Semple was reaching for him, Boucher dismounted his horse and began running back to his side. Boucher's account differs slightly, in that Semple and his men disarmed him, and that his horse took flight and that he was fired upon while riding the frightened animal away. One of Semple's men fired his gun, which triggered the fighting. Within 15 minutes nearly everyone from Semple's group was either injured or dead.

Semple was still alive when the fighting ended, but had a non-fatal injury. Semple asked Grant to allow him to go back to the fort so he would live and Grant agreed. However, before he could leave an Indian rode past and shot him in the chest, killing him.

In total, 22 men died in the battle, 21 were from Semple's side, including himself. On the other hand, only one man died from the Metis group. Nearly all of Semple's men died, but John Pritchard, one of the few to survive, wrote on what happened at the battle. The recount that he left remains one of the best and most reliable Anglophone accounts on the Battle at Seven Oaks.

Miles Macdonell was the first from the Hudson's Bay Company to hear about the massacre, and told Lord Selkirk on 24 July what had happened at the Red River Settlement. Selkirk, infuriated, went to the North West Company headquarters to confront them on what their men and the Metis had done.

In total, 17 men, including Cuthbert Grant, were charged with the murder of Robert Semple. Due to his actions and the outcome at Seven Oaks, Cuthbert Grant became one of the most hated men to the Red River settlers.

== Controversy of Seven Oaks as a massacre ==
The battle that happened at Seven Oaks has traditionally been viewed by historians as a massacre. Dick Lyle argued that it was not a massacre, but that the incident at Seven Oaks was depicted that way by Anglo-Canadians to portray the métis as violent and as a result, justify taking their homes on First Nations lands. On the other hand, the story entered Métis lore as proof of their supremacy over the land and other people, as in Pierre Falcon's song, "La chanson des Bois-brûlés," and especially "La chanson de la Grenouillère" (see below).

=== Coltman's Report ===
One of the first accounts of what happened at Seven Oaks is known as Coltman's report. Today, Coltman is praised for providing one of the best sources on the incident. Unfortunately, this source was largely ignored by many historians until 1910. Coltman gathered information from an equal number of people, from both sides of the battle, and analysed their credibility. Coltman also did not let his personal beliefs cloud his report. Overall, the information that he gathered was mostly unbiased and very extensive. The conclusions that Coltman made in his report did not support the ideals that many of the white-Anglo historians wanted to convey. This source was intentionally ignored as historians would choose sources that agreed with their opinions rather than those that told the truth.

Coltman's report determined that the Selkirk men fired the first shot and began the battle. He argued that the battle should not be called a massacre because Semple had begun the battle. The fight was lost due to the Selkirk men being unaccustomed to the way the Metis fought. The Metis were skilled at close combat, allowing them to win the battle with such a high rate of success.

Coltman examined the rumours of the Metis "finishing off the enemy", meaning killing men that would have otherwise lived. He determined that this practice did happen but it was not an act of extreme violence. Rather, they did this because the Metis did not take prisoners.

Other rumours such as the Metis did not bury the bodies and left them to be eaten by animals were found to be true. Coltman argued that some Metis did behave cruelly, but it could not be applied to the whole group.

=== Chanson de la Grenouillère ===
Pierre Falcon a Métis, wrote the "Chanson de la Grenouillère" a song about what happened at the battle of Seven Oaks. This song was not ever looked at by historians for the same reasons that Coltmas report was not utilised; because it did not support the ideals of the white-Anglo historian.

=== Alexander Ross ===
Alexander Ross wrote a book on the battle in 1856. Modern historians explain that "Ross's interpretive framework is uncomplicated: it is a straightforward expression of the theme of "civilization versus savagery". The civilized white man versus the savage Indian that Ross portrayed became a theme that repeated in the majority of history books afterwards. The Metis were labeled as the ones who fired the first shot and killed Semple and his men. The writing of the book was an "effort by Ross to privilege his own European ethnicity in opposition to the posited savagery of all Native people within the Red River Settlement, including persons of mixed race".

Ross's book had success and was widely accepted by historians despite much of the account being false and lacking in proper evidence. It was this book that began the false telling of what happened at the Red River Settlement between Semple and Grant.

The stereotypes he created would then be repeated throughout history. The history that Ross wrote is said to have been the tool used by white Anglos to justify having settled on native land without reasonable grounds.

=== George Bryce ===
Similar to Ross, George Bryce was asked to write Manitoba's history from his white, European, and upper class perspective. The history that he wrote was one sided and promoted Selkirks actions. Bryce describes "Selkirk and his party [as] the unproblematic heros, and the NWC and the Metis the villains, underscored by their putative role at Seven Oaks". There were many problems with the credibility of Bryce's research. "In researching 7 oaks, [Bryce] simply looked for testimony from the Selkirk side alleging Metis savagery, quoted it at length and ignored contrary evidence". Thus, the same problems and stereotypes that were present in Ross's history were then repeated and set further precedent for other historians poorly representing the incident at Seven Oaks. Bryce, like Ross understood that "representing 7 oaks as a "massacre: was therefore integral the construction of a new master narrative of progress in the West".

=== French Canadian writings ===
Writings on the Seven Oaks incident by French Canadians were kinder to the Metis, but still stated that the Metis were responsible for the battle and coined the event as a massacre.

=== W. L. Morton ===
W. L. Morton's history further discredited the Metis. He states in his history that either Deschamps or Machicabou (an Indian) killed Semple and repeatedly represents the Metis as savages who terrorised Semple's group. Like the other white-Anglo historians before him, Morton wrote a biased history that promoted his ethnic group and class. His history was also used to discredit the Riel resistance. In his writings, Morton was harsher on the description of the Metis. Whereas older historians had presented the Metis as wild but noble (a mix of positive and negative characteristics) Morton describes the Metis as completely negative.

== Legacy ==
To justify white-Anglo actions, the Metis needed to be shown as violent and lacking judgement and a prime example of this was done through the histories written on the battle at Seven Oaks. "Seven oaks provided a convenient vehicle for the presentation of an alleged Metis weakness of character, implicitly justifying the disposition of their lands".

Today, the myths of what happened at Seven Oaks have become nearly "resistant to revision" due to the original histories on the topic.
