= St. François Xavier, Manitoba =

St. François Xavier
- Unincorporated urban centre
- The White Horse Monument, a 1966 sculpture commemorating the legend of White Horse Plain

- Location of St. François Xavier in Manitoba
- Coordinates: 49°54′46″N 97°32′30″W
- Country: Canada
- Province: Manitoba
- Region: Central Plains and Winnipeg Metro
- Census Division: No. 10
- Municipality: RM of St. François Xavier
- Founded: 1824
- Post office established: 1871

Area
  - Land: 3.38 km^{2} (1.31 sq mi)

Population (2016)
  - Total: 662
  - Density: 195.8/km^{2} (507/sq mi)
- Time zone: UTC−6 (CST)
  - Summer (DST): UTC−5 (CDT)
- Forward sortation area: R4L
- Area code: 204

St. François Xavier is an unincorporated urban centre located in the Rural Municipality of St. François Xavier, Manitoba, Canada. It is located about 15 km west of the city of Winnipeg on the Assiniboine River.

Settled around 1824 as Grantown, it is the second oldest settlement in Manitoba.

== History ==
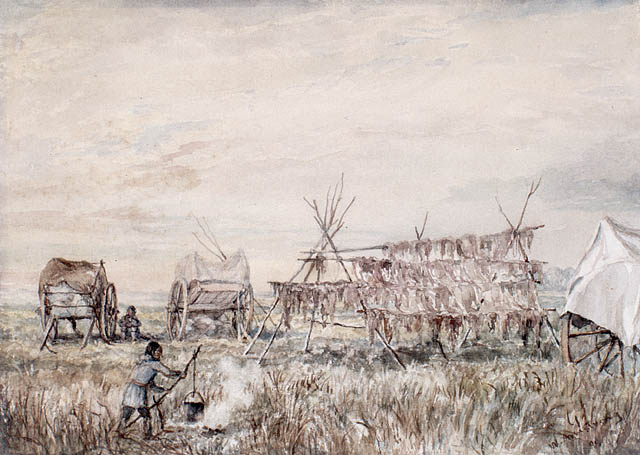
Métis drying buffalo meat at St. Francois Xavier (Painted in 1899 by William Armstrong)

The area of current-day St. François Xavier, commonly known as White Horse Plains (La Prairie du Cheval Blanc), was home to several distinct First Nations, such as the Cree and the Dakota. The lands in the area supported numerous buffalo and other game animals.

Around 1824, Cuthbert Grant, who had recently led the Métis in the Battle of Seven Oaks, arrived in the area and was soon joined by many Métis families. The settlement was thereby founded, and named Grantown after Grant.

The Métis have since had a noticeable role in the municipality and throughout the province.

In 1851, Father Louis-François Richer Laflèche accompanied the Métis buffalo hunters from the Parish of St. François Xavier on one of their annual hunts on the prairies. The hunting group, led by Jean Baptiste Falcon, son of Pierre Falcon (a Métis songwriter), was made up of 67 men, a number of women who came to prepare the meat, some small children and 200 carts. In North Dakota they encountered a band of Sioux. Laflèche dressed only in a black cassock, white surplice, and stole, directed with the camp commander Jean Baptiste Falcon a miraculous defence against 2,000 Sioux combatants, using a crucifix at the Battle of Grand Coteau in North Dakota. After a siege of two days (July 13 and 14), the Sioux withdrew, convinced that the Great Spirit protected the Métis.

The St. François-Xavier post office was opened in 1871 and closed in 1975. In 1891, the St-François Xavier subdistrict had a population of 1105.

== Demographics ==
In the 2021 Census of Population conducted by Statistics Canada, St. Francois Xavier had a population of 845 living in 272 of its 278 total private dwellings, a change of 27.6% from its 2016 population of 662. With a land area of 3.39 km^{2} (1.31 sq mi), it had a population density of 249.3/km^{2} (645.6/sq mi) in 2021.

== Notable people ==
Notable people buried at the St. Francois Xavier Roman Catholic Church and Cemetery include:

- Cuthbert Grant
- Patrice Breland
- Pascal Breland
- Pierre Falcon
- Bruce Hardy

== See also ==
- Métis buffalo hunt
