= Mount Selkirk =

Mountain in British Columbia, Canada

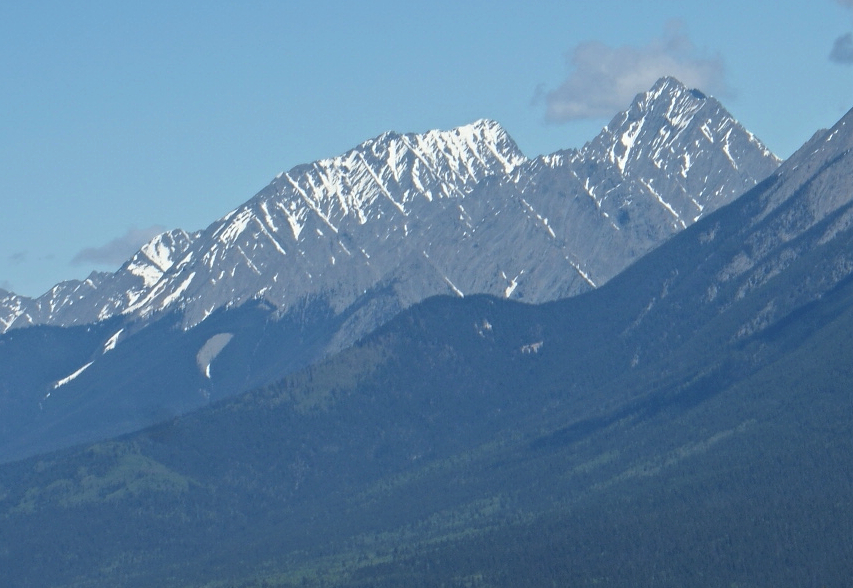
- Mount Selkirk (upper right); From Kootenay Valley Overlook along Highway 93

Highest point
- Elevation: 2,930 m (9,610 ft)
- Prominence: 320 m (1,050 ft)
- Parent peak: Catlin Peak (2941 m)
- Listing: Mountains of British Columbia
- Coordinates: 50°51′59″N 115°54′30″W

Geography
- Location within British Columbia Location within Canada
- Interactive map of Mount Selkirk
- Location: Kootenay National Park; British Columbia, Canada
- District: Kootenay Land District
- Parent range: Mitchell Range; Canadian Rockies
- Topo map: NTS 82J13 Mount Assiniboine

Geology
- Rock age: Cambrian
- Rock type: Limestone

Mount Selkirk is a 2,930-metre (9,610-foot) mountain summit located in the Vermilion River Valley along the eastern border of Kootenay National Park. Park visitors can see the peak from Highway 93, also known as the Banff–Windermere Highway. It is part of the Mitchell Range, which is a sub-range of the Canadian Rockies of British Columbia, Canada. The nearest higher neighbor is Catlin Peak, 1.6 km (0.99 mi) to the northwest.

== History ==
The mountain was named in 1886 by George Mercer Dawson in honor of Thomas Douglas, 5th Earl of Selkirk (1771-1820), a Scottish philanthropist who sponsored immigrant settlements at the Red River Colony in what is now Manitoba. The mountain's toponym was officially adopted in 1924 by the Geographical Names Board of Canada.

== Geology ==
Mount Selkirk is composed principally of Ottertail limestone, sedimentary rock laid down during the Precambrian to Cambrian periods and pushed east and over the top of younger rock during the Laramide orogeny.

== Climate ==
Based on the Köppen climate classification, Mount Selkirk is located in a subarctic climate zone with cold, snowy winters, and mild summers. Temperatures can drop below −20 °C with wind chill factors below −30 °C. Precipitation runoff from the mountain drains into tributaries of the Vermilion River.

== Gallery ==
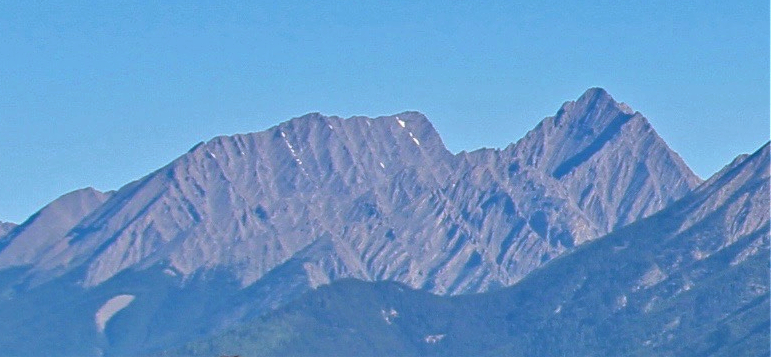
Catlin Peak and Mount Selkirk (right)

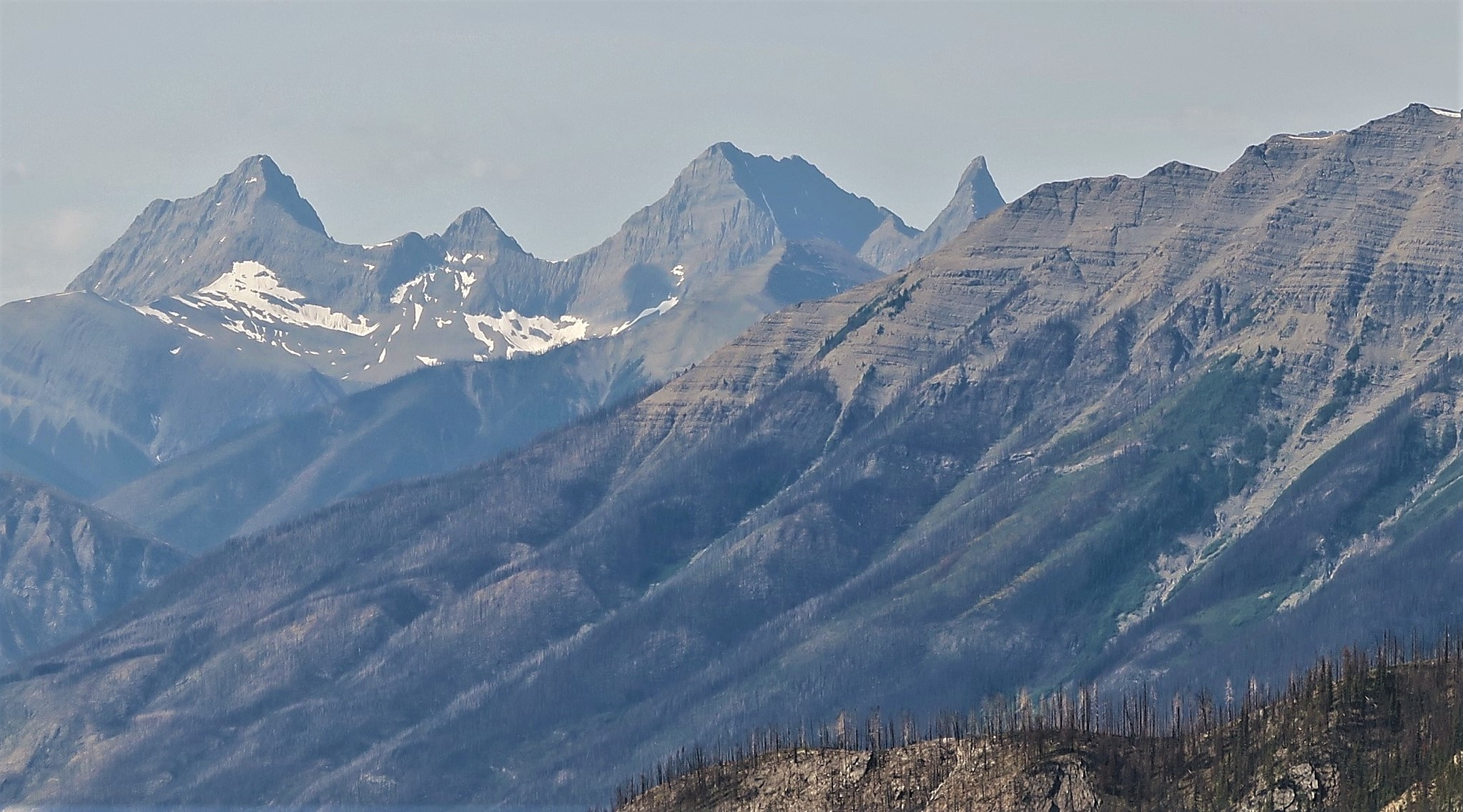
Mount Selkirk (left) and Catlin Peak (center) from northeast at Sunshine Meadows

== See also ==
- Geology of the Rocky Mountains
- Geography of British Columbia
