= Battle of Grand Coteau =

Battle of Grand Coteau (North Dakota)
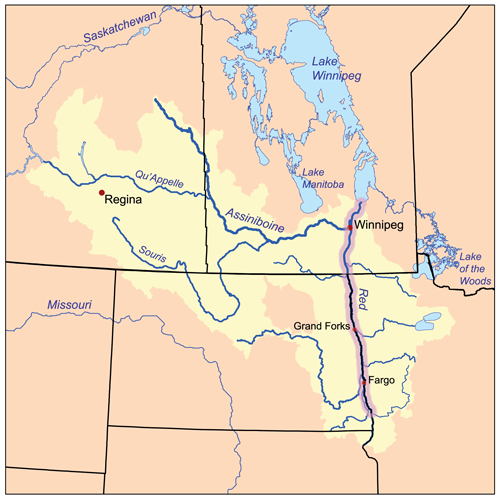
- Battle of Grand Coteau (North Dakota); Red dot shows approximate location
Date	July 13 and 14, 1851
Location	47°59′N 101°12′W southeast of Minot, North Dakota
Result	Métis victory

Belligerents
Métis buffalo hunters	Sioux (Yanktonai)

Commanders and leaders
Jean Baptiste Falcon	Chief Medicine Bear

Strength
67–77	2,000

Casualties and losses
1 dead 12 horses killed	15–80 dead 65 horses killed

The Battle of Grand Coteau, or the Battle of Grand Coteau du Missouri, was fought between Métis buffalo hunters of Red River and the Sioux in what is now North Dakota between July 13 and 14, 1851. The Métis won the battle, the last major one between the two groups.

The buffalo hunt was a yearly event for the Métis of the Red River Colony. After sowing their fields in the spring, the Métis would set out with their wives and children and leave the aged and infirm to take care of the crop. Their principal settlement was situated on the banks of the Red River of the North in what is now the city of Winnipeg, Manitoba, Canada.

Made up largely of French Métis, they would leave for the summer buffalo hunt around the middle of June and returned in the middle of August with their pemmican and other dried meats. Often harassed by the Sioux, the Métis from the various settlements of Red River traveled in large groups for defence.

== The battle ==
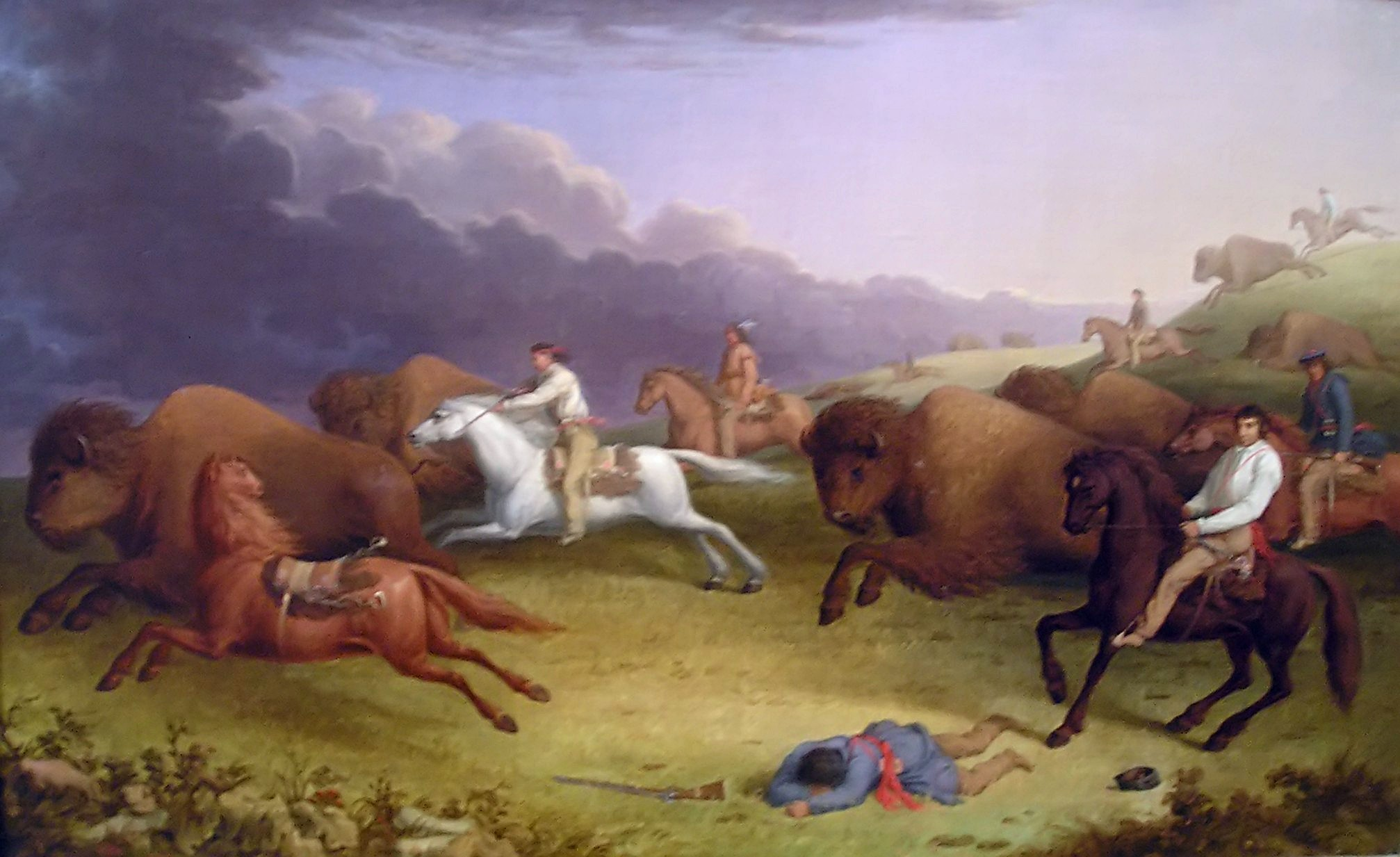
Paul Kane's oil painting depicting a Métis buffalo hunt on the prairies of Dakota in June 1846

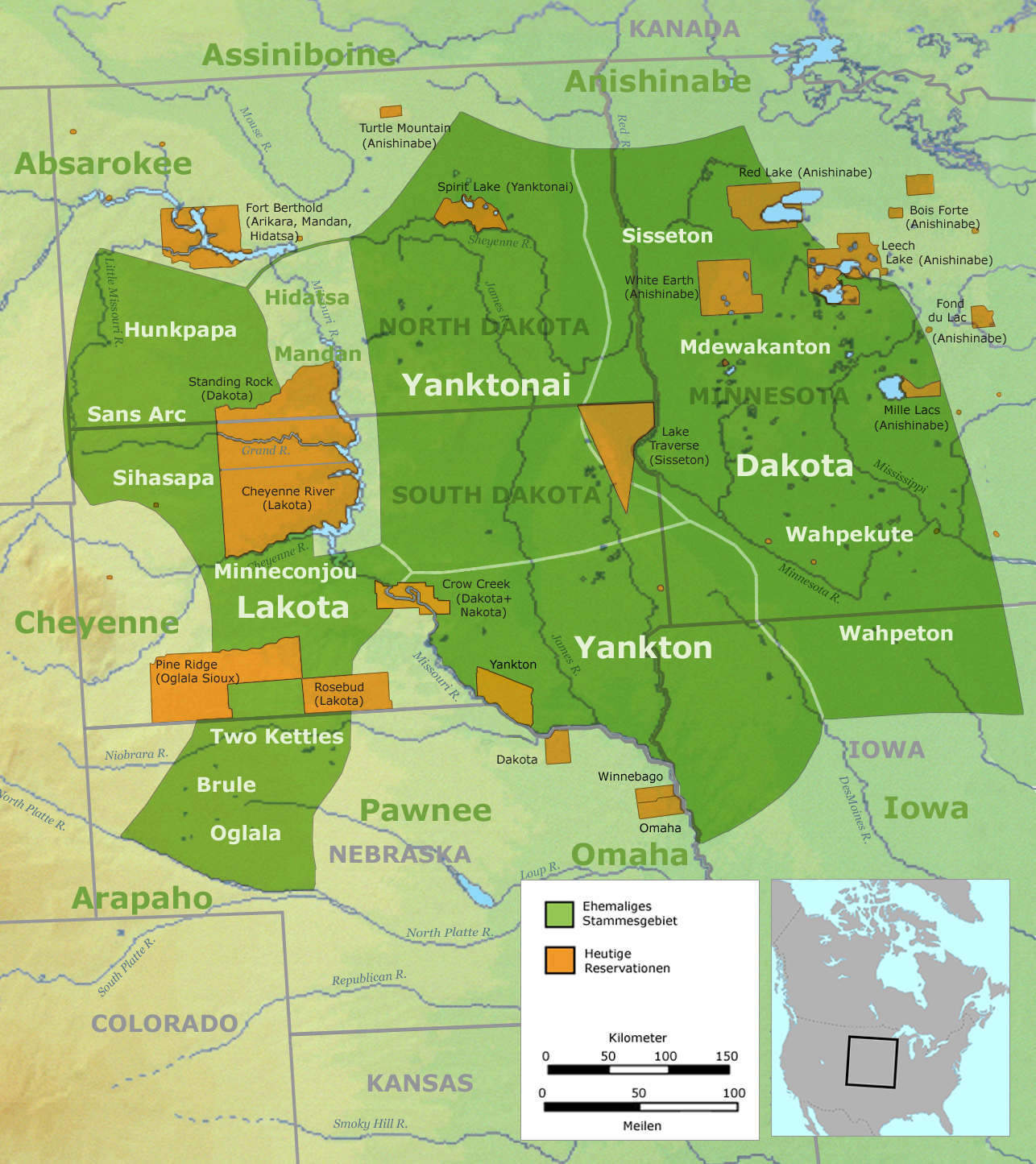
Map showing the general locations of the tribes and subtribes of the Sioux by the late 18th century; current reservations are shown in orange.

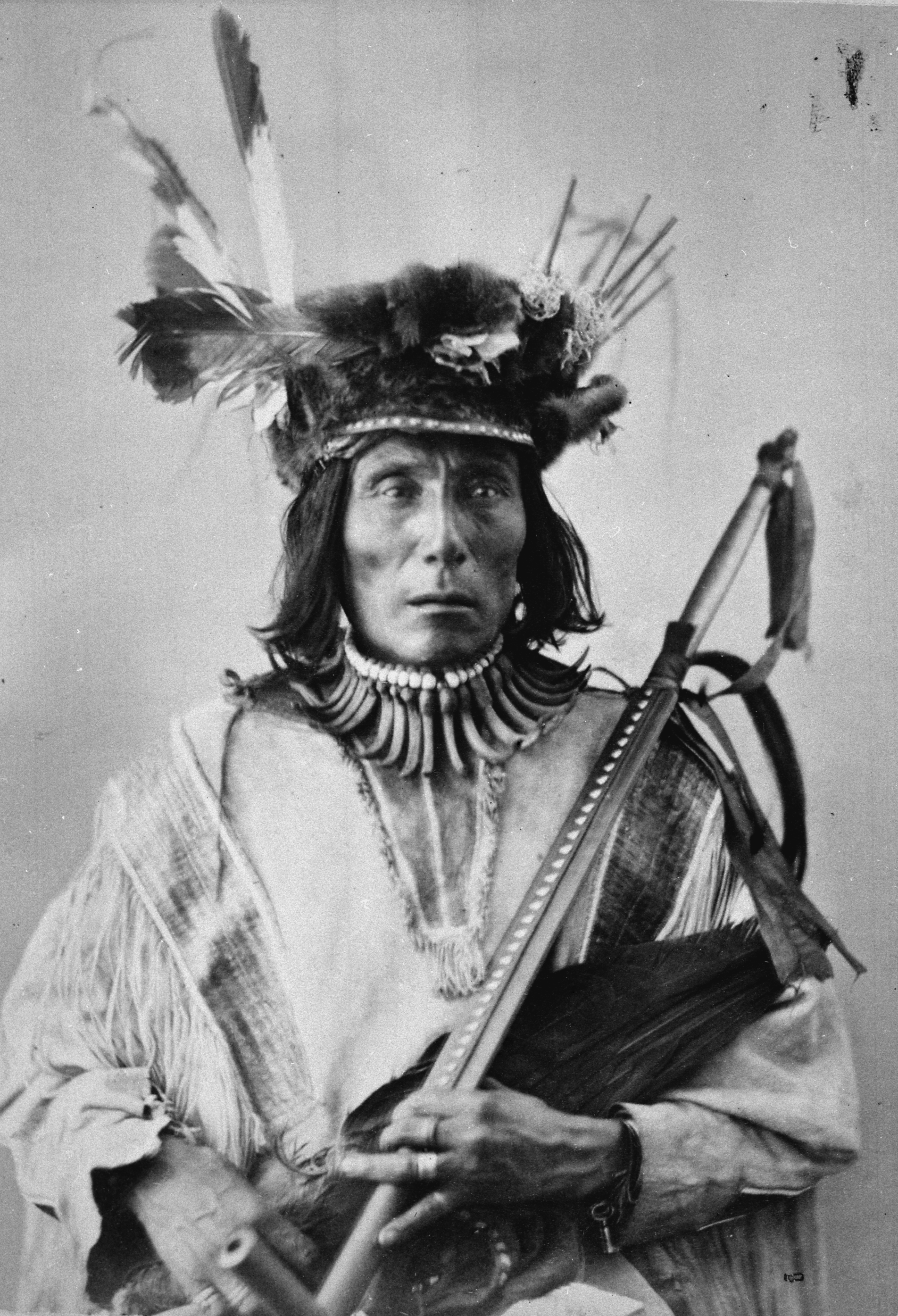
Chief Medicine Bear in 1872

The 1851 buffalo hunt initially proceeded as follows. The St. Boniface group made rendezvous with the Pembina group on June 16 then traveled west to meet the St. François Xavier group (June 19). There were 1,300 people, 1,100 carts and 318 hunters in the combined groups. The groups hunted separately but planned to unite against any threat from the Sioux. They divided into three groups about 20–30 miles (32–48 km) from one another and moved the same way.

The St. François Xavier (White Horse Plain) group led by Jean Baptiste Falcon, son of Pierre Falcon, and accompanied by its missionary, Father Louis-François Richer Laflèche, numbered 200 carts and 67 hunters, as well as women and children. In North Dakota on the Grand Coteau of the Missouri on July 12, the scouts of St. François Xavier spotted a large band of Sioux. The five scouts riding back to warn the camp met with a party of 20 Sioux who surrounded them. Two made a run for it under fire, but three were kept as captives. Two would escape the next day, and one was killed. On July 13, the camp was attacked by the Sioux.

Laflèche, dressed in a black cassock, white surplice, and stole, directed with the camp commander, Jean Baptiste Falcon, a miraculous defense against 2,000 Sioux combatants, holding up a crucifix during the battle. After a siege of two days (July 13 and 14), the Sioux withdrew since they were convinced that the Great Spirit protected the Métis.

The Missouri Coteau, or Missouri Plateau, is a plateau that stretches along the eastern side of the valley of the Missouri River in central North Dakota and north-central South Dakota, United States, and extends into Saskatchewan and Alberta, Canada. The Coteau du Missouri can also refer to a line of rolling hills on the eastern edge of the Missouri Plateau.

== See also ==
- List of battles fought in North Dakota
- Métis buffalo hunt
- Dakota War of 1862
- Sioux Wars
- Red River Trails
- Second Battle of Adobe Walls
- Battle of the Little Big Horn
