= Lord Selkirk Regional Comprehensive Secondary School =

High school in Selkirk, Manitoba, Canada

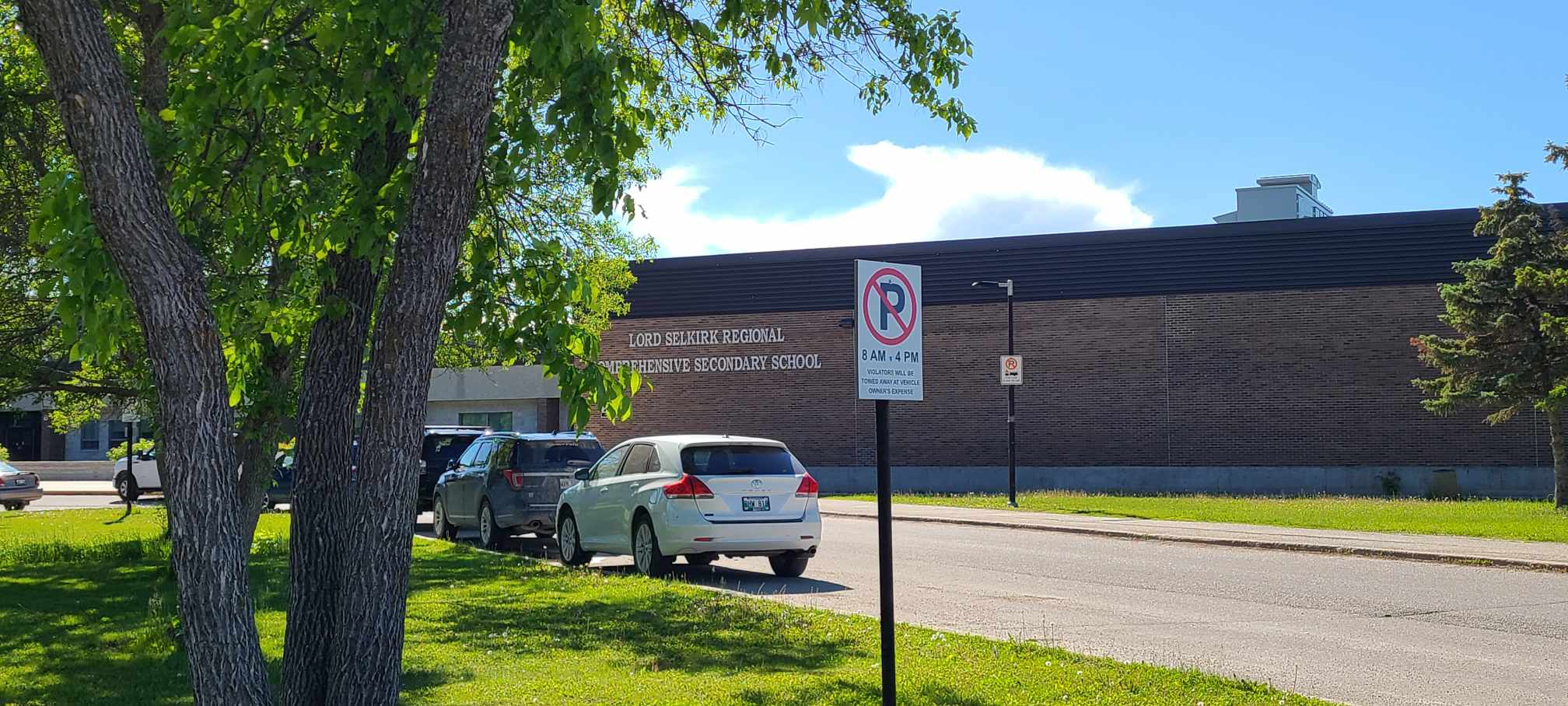

Location
- Selkirk, Manitoba; Canada; 50°08′25″N 96°53′29″W

Information
- Type: Public secondary
- Established: 1971
- School district: Lord Selkirk School Division
- Principal: Darcy Nazimek
- Enrollment: 1,002 (2022)
- Colours: Blue and grey
- Mascot: Royals
- Website: lsrcss.lssd.ca

Lord Selkirk Regional Comprehensive Secondary School is a large public high school located in Selkirk, Manitoba, and the largest high school in the Lord Selkirk School Division with an enrollment of 1,002 students in 2022. The school was officially opened on November 27, 1971. The sports teams are known as the Royals.

== Notable alumni ==
- Alfie Michaud former Professional hockey player for the Vancouver Canucks. Class of 1994
- Keith McCambridge former Professional hockey player and coach for the Manitoba Moose. Class of 1992
- Troy Westwood former Professional football player for the Winnipeg Blue Bombers. Class of 1987
- Glen Hnatiuk former Professional golfer. Class of 1985
