= William Bachelor Coltman =

- Born: Great Britain
- Died: 1826
- Occupations: merchant, Justice of the Peace, Legislator, Commissioner
- Known for: restored order in the Red River Colony, following the Battle of Seven Oaks

William Bachelor Coltman (died 1826) was a politician, active in the early 19th century. He was born in Great Britain, and traveled to Canada in 1799. He worked as a merchant in Quebec City, and purchased a schooner, and entered into a partnership with his brother John, and two merchants in Yorkshire, in 1807. In 1808 he acquired a contract to supply flour to the Army, in Canada.

He was appointed a Justice of the Peace in 1810. He was appointed a member of Lower Canada's Executive Council, in 1812.

In 1816 competition between two fur trading companies, the older Hudson's Bay Company and the upstart Northwest Company had escalated to violence. 21 early settlers in what is now Manitoba, in a settlement backed by the Hudson's Bay Company, were shot, by traders from the Northwest Company. In response Lord Selkirk, the settlement's sponsor, captured Fort William, on Lake Superior, where the Northwest Company had its regional headquarters. Coltman and John Fletcher were given commissions as Lieutenant Colonel and Major in the Indian Department, and sent to investigate.

The pair had to wait for spring of 1817 to set out, with a small contingent of troops. Coltman left Fletcher in charge at Fort Williams. When he arrived at the Red River Colony he concluded the Northwest Company traders had been fired in self defence. He arrested Selkirk, and restored order.
