= Thomas Douglas, 5th Earl of Selkirk =

Scottish landowner and philanthropist (1771–1820)

The Right Honourable The Earl of Selkirk FRS FRSE
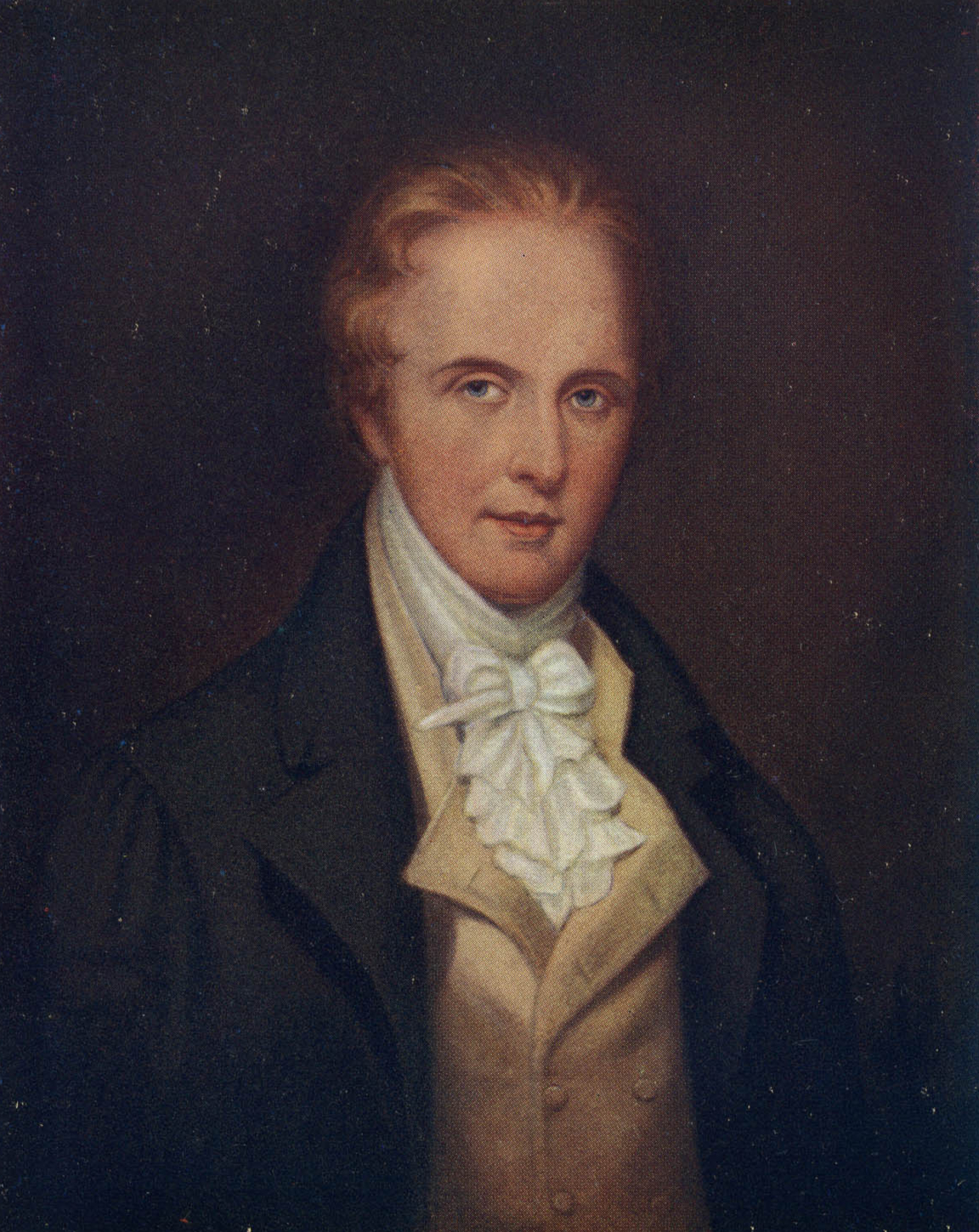
- Portrait of Selkirk

Lord Lieutenant of Kirkcudbright
- In office 1807–1820
- Preceded by: The 7th Earl of Galloway
- Succeeded by: The 8th Earl of Galloway

Personal details
- Born: 20 June 1771 Kirkcudbright, Scotland
- Died: 8 April 1820 (aged 48) Pau, France
- Resting place: Orthez, France
- Parent(s): Dunbar Douglas, 4th Earl of Selkirk, Helen Hamilton

Thomas Douglas, 5th Earl of Selkirk FRS FRSE (20 June 1771 – 8 April 1820) was a Scottish landowner and philanthropist best known for sponsoring immigrant settlements in Canada at the Red River Colony.

== Early background ==
He was born at St Mary's Isle, Kirkcudbrightshire, Scotland, the seventh son of Dunbar Douglas, 4th Earl of Selkirk, and his wife Helen Hamilton (1738–1802), granddaughter of Thomas Hamilton, 6th Earl of Haddington. His brother was Basil William Douglas, Lord Daer.

His early education was at the Palgrave Academy, Suffolk. As he had not expected to inherit the family estate, he went to the University of Edinburgh to study to become a lawyer. While there, he noticed poor Scottish crofters who were being displaced by their landlords. Seeing their plight, he investigated ways he could help them find new land in the then British colonies. In 1794, on the death of his brother Basil, Thomas became Lord Daer. After his father's death in 1799, Douglas, the last surviving son (two brothers died in infancy, two died of tuberculosis and two died of yellow fever), became the 5th Earl of Selkirk.

In 1798 he was elected a Fellow of the Royal Society of Edinburgh, his proposers being Dugald Stewart, Andrew Coventry, and John Playfair.

== Involvement in Canada ==
When Thomas unexpectedly inherited the Selkirk title and estates in 1799, he used his money and political connections to purchase land and settle poor Scottish farmers in Belfast, Prince Edward Island, in 1803 and Baldoon, Upper Canada in 1804. (See Highland Clearances for more on the emigration of poor Scots.) In 1804, he was in Halifax and became a member of the North British Society. He travelled extensively in North America, and his approach and work gained him some fame; in 1807 he was named Lord-Lieutenant of Kirkcudbright, Scotland, and in 1808 was elected a Fellow of the Royal Society of London.

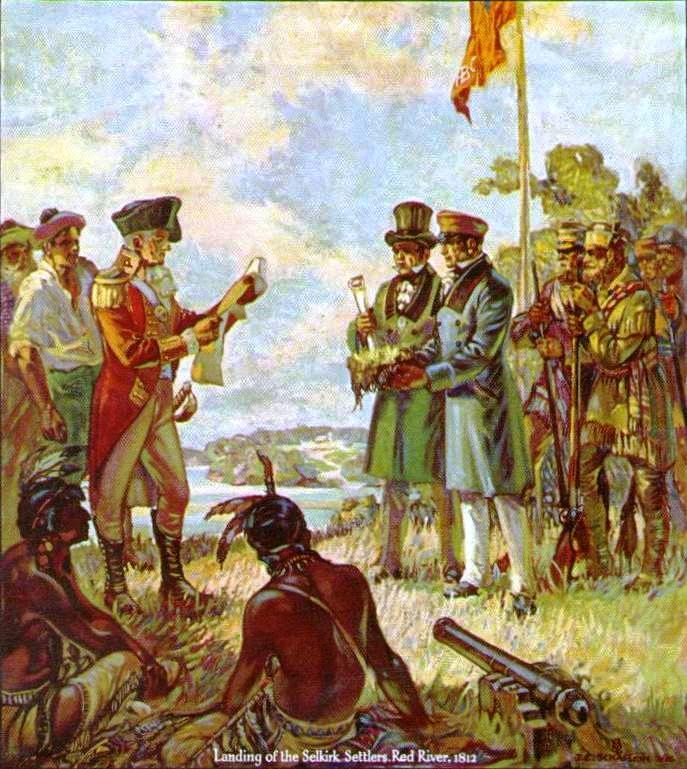
Landing of the Selkirk Settlers, Red River, 1812

In order to continue his work re-settling Scottish farmers, Selkirk asked the British government for a land grant in the Red River Valley, a part of Rupert's Land. The government refused, as the Hudson's Bay Company (H.B.C.) had been granted a fur trading monopoly on that land. However, Selkirk was very determined, and together with Sir Alexander Mackenzie bought enough shares in H.B.C. to let them gain control of the land. This position of power, along with his marriage connections (his wife Jean was the sister of Andrew Wedderburn, a member of the H.B.C. governing committee) allowed him to acquire a land grant called Assiniboia to serve as an agricultural settlement for the company. As part of the agreement for the land grant, Selkirk agreed to supply the Hudson's Bay Company with 200 men each year. He also agreed that the settlers would not be allowed to participate in the fur trade.

As part owner of H.B.C., Selkirk also wanted to stop the North West Company (N.W.C.) from competing with H.B.C. for furs in the region. By placing the Red River Colony astride the trade routes used by the N.W.C. coureurs des bois, Selkirk could cut off the easy flow of furs. However, the local Métis people who already inhabited the area had long-standing ties with the N.W.C. and refused to accept Selkirk's control over the area, which was contrary to the Royal Proclamation of 1763.

The first colonization attempt started in 1812, consisting of 128 men led by the new governor, Miles Macdonell. Arriving late in the season they had just arrived and built homes when the winter cut off any hope of planting, and the colony became reliant on the support of the Métis. Even with a full growing season the next year, the colony never thrived. Because of a shortage of food in 1814, Macdonell issued the Pemmican Proclamation, prohibiting the export of food from the entire area. The Métis, who made a living selling pemmican to the N.W.C. traders, responded by arresting Macdonell and burning the settlement.

Robert Semple was appointed as governor of the Red River Colony. By 1816, the violence intensified between the Métis and the newcomers, which resulted in the Battle of Seven Oaks, causing the deaths of 21 of Lord Selkirk's men, including the newly appointed governor, and one Métis. N.W.C. partners were accused of having aided the Métis attackers. All were exonerated at trial, and again when re-tried under Selkirk's instigation, which back-fired when they successfully counter-sued Selkirk.

Selkirk and his men responded to the Battle of Seven Oaks by seizing the trading post at Fort William that belonged to the North West Company. In the aftermath, Selkirk was ordered to appear in court in Montreal and was charged with four separate offences, all of which related to the alleged unlawful occupation of Fort William. Selkirk reportedly spent most of his acquired fortune defending himself (unsuccessfully) in court, shortly before his death in 1820 at Pau, France. The two companies were merged in 1821.

== Legacy ==
Selkirk's colonizing ambitions have been memorialized in the names of the City of Selkirk and the Village of East Selkirk, as well as the Winnipeg neighborhood of Point Douglas, the city's Fort Douglas Park on Waterfront Drive (where Fort Douglas once stood) and Winnipeg's Selkirk Avenue. The City of Selkirk is served by the Lord Selkirk Regional Comprehensive Secondary School, which is administered by the Lord Selkirk School Division. The Lord Selkirk Highway runs from the international boundary between Manitoba and North Dakota, where it connects with Interstate 29 in the United States, to the city of Winnipeg. Mount Selkirk and the Selkirk Mountains were also named in his honor.

The Métis peoples cite Lord Selkirk's intrusion as the period of time their identity as a people came into existence. The Métis existed prior to the confrontations with Lord Selkirk's men but their armed resistance to foreign encroachment became a rallying point for their shared identity. A flag and a national anthem were born during this period in time. A Manitoba Historical Plaque was erected in Winnipeg, Manitoba by the province to commemorate Lord Selkirk's role in Manitoba's heritage.

== Selkirk and John Paul Jones ==
At the age of seven, Thomas was almost kidnapped by John Paul Jones, commander of an American ship. Peter C. Newman tells the story as follows in his history The Empire of the Bay.

In 1778, John Paul Jones, in the sloop Ranger, was cruising between Scotland and Ireland looking for prizes. Benjamin Franklin had suggested that he might capture a British nobleman to exchange for American prisoners. Having been born near the Selkirk estates, Jones selected the elder Lord Selkirk.

At the last moment, Jones decided not to go himself, but to assign the duty to two lieutenants and a boatload of sailors. As the Americans approached the Selkirk mansion, a governess saw them coming and removed young Thomas to safety. The Americans knocked on the front door and were greeted by the butler. Lady Selkirk came from the breakfast room to see what the fuss was about. She invited the American officers into the drawing room, told the butler to make tea and to find some whisky for the sailors who were waiting outside. When they explained that they had come to kidnap her husband, Lady Selkirk replied that unfortunately Lord Selkirk was not at home. When Lieutenant Wallingford suggested that instead, they might take the young gentleman they saw on the way to the house, Lady Selkirk replied that they would have to kill her first. After more discussion, Lady Selkirk suggested that, so that their mission would not be a complete failure, they might steal the family silver. The officers allowed as how that might be the best solution, so Lady Selkirk ordered the butler to provide the American gentlemen with what they needed. He filled a sack half full of coal, filled the top half with silverware and presented it to the officers. After drinking a toast to Lady Selkirk, they returned to their ship and presented their captain with his sack full of coal and silverware.

Jones wrote Lady Selkirk a flowery letter of apology, proposing himself to buy back the booty from the Navy and return it to the Selkirks. Lord Selkirk wrote back that he could not possibly countenance the return of his silver without the consent of the Continental Congress. The objects, which became the subject of protracted legal negotiations, were returned seven years later.

== Marriage and family ==
Lord Selkirk married Jean Wedderburn-Colville, sister to James Wedderburn and Andrew Colville, in 1807, and fathered:

- Dunbar Douglas, 6th Earl of Selkirk (1809–1885);
- Lady Isabella Helen Douglas (1811–1893), married Charles Hope;
- Lady Katherine Jean Douglas (1816–1863), married Loftus Wigram.

== Death ==
In the late stages of tuberculosis, Lord Selkirk wanted to travel to the warm climate of southern Spain with his family from London and agreed to bring young doctor George William Lefevre as his travelling physician. With good weather, Selkirk's spirits and cough improved between Paris and Bordeaux. Before crossing the Pyrenees, they stopped at Pau in mid-October 1819. Lefevre wrote about their ride the following day:

Everything that I had hitherto beheld appeared insignificant compared with the scenery which now presented itself...under our feet extended a long plain of meadowland, through which the Gave serpentined in a quick and bubbling stream. The foreground was bounded by a long ridge of hills covered with the vines festooning from their summits to their feet; backed by forest and bounded by the Pyrenees stretching along the horizon, resembled, by their rugged summits, the back bone of the globe... The sight of all this grandeur determined the party upon making Pau their winter quarters.

The Selkirks were the first notable British family to have resided at Pau having taken half of the Hotel de Bayard. Winter was severe and Selkirk's health declined until he could go only as far as the place Royale in front of their lodgings in a sedan chair to bask in the sun and admire the snow-capped Pyrenees.

On his death, his heir and successor Dunbar was only 10 years old and thus Selkirk's estates were put into a trust and managed by four executors named in his will. The Board of Trustees consisted of Andrew Colville (Colvile) of Achiltrie and Crommie, John Hallbrith (Halkett) of Waring, Adam Maitland of Dundrennan, and Sir James Montgomery, 2nd Baronet.

== Works ==
- Observations on the present state of the Highlands of Scotland, with a view of the causes and probable consequences of emigration. London: Longman, Hurst, Rees, and Orme. 1805.
- Sketch of the British Fur Trade in North America (1816)

== See also ==
- James Douglas (governor) (1803–1877), a high-ranking Hudson's Bay Company officer and later governor of Vancouver Island

Honorary titles
Preceded by The 7th Earl of Galloway	Lord Lieutenant of Kirkcudbright; 1807–1820	Succeeded by The 8th Earl of Galloway
Peerage of Scotland
Preceded by Dunbar Douglas	Earl of Selkirk; 1799–1820	Succeeded by Dunbar James Douglas
