= Pascal Breland =

Canadian politician and trader (1811-1896)

Pascal Breland was a 19th-century Métis farmer and politician in Rupert's Land. He was a well-known Metis trader and was popularly nicknamed "le Roi des traiteurs" (The King of the traders). He held several appointed political positions as well as elected offices, with his work and influence playing a key role in shaping the identity of Western Canadian provinces as they exist today.

== Personal life ==
Breland was born on June 15, 1811, in the Saskatchewan Valley in the Northwest Territories (today in the province of Saskatchewan). He was baptized at Laval, Quebec on November 19, 1812. His father, Pierre Berland dit Duboishu, was a French-Canadian Voyageur, hunter and trader. His mother, Marie Louise Josephe Bilideau (or Beledau), was of mixed French and First Nations ancestry. In the late 1820s, Pascal moved to the town St. François Xavier, Manitoba, from Quebec. There, on February 8, 1836, Pascal married Maria Grant (1820-1889), daughter of Cuthbert Grant. Pascal and Maria had fourteen children:

- Patrice Breland (1837-1908)
- Cycle Breland (1838-1842)
- Marie "Judith" Breland (1841-1907) — wife of Casimir Dauphinais, the son of Francois Dauphinais
- Thomas Breland (1842-1876)
- Elisabeth Breland (1844-1846)
- Marguerite Breland (1846-?)
- Luxine "Lucie" Breland (1848-1907)
- Clemence Breland (1849-?) — wife of Firmin Hamelin, the son of Salomon Hamelin; Clemence and Firmin were parents to Joseph Hamelin
- Placidee Breland (1851-1870)
- Elisabeth "Eliza/Laiza" Breland (1853-1921)
- Josue Breland (1855-?)
- Pascal Napoleon Breland (1857-1861)
- Gregoire Breland (1859-?)
- Marie Justine Breland (1861-?)

Breland died on October 24, 1896; he is buried next to his wife in the St. Francois Xavier Roman Catholic Cemetery.

=== Metis identity ===
The distinct Metis culture that Pascal Breland belongs to is an important factor in understanding how he became a “prominent” Manitoban.

Raised with the combined knowledge of fur traders and various First Nations peoples, Metis had a way of life that made them especially apt to dominate the pre-confederation plains economy. Breland gained land and notoriety through his farming ability, but also is rumored to have run an illegal side business trading in the region without the approval of the monopolistic Hudson's Bay Company.

His marriage to Maria Grant is telling of a certain respect he held within his community, as her father was Cuthbert Grant, another prominent Metis leader. The couple had 14 children, with the eldest son (Patrice) eventually following in his father's political footsteps.

Breland's political career well known within the Metis community. Breland retained status through important positions on buffalo hunts, and may have become captain of these hunts after Cuthbert Grant's death, though the records of this are not definite.

== Political career ==
Breland's life as a prominent Metis figure during the tumultuous period of the late 1800s was inherently political. Known for several reasons, Pascal was the son-in-law of Cuthbert Grant, a hunt and trading chief of numerous hivernant villages, and the patriarch of St. Francois Xavier. Trusted by First Nations bands in the West, Breland was often sent as a messenger or negotiator in political or legal collaborations.

He supported Louis Riel Sr. in the protest against the Pierre Guillaume Sayer trial in 1849. However, became unpopular with many resistance leaders due to his absence during the Red River Resistance of 1869-70 and condemnation of Louis Riel. In 1851, Breland was appointed magistrate for White Horse Plains.

=== Council of Assiniboia ===
Breland became a member of the Council of Assiniboia in September 1857.

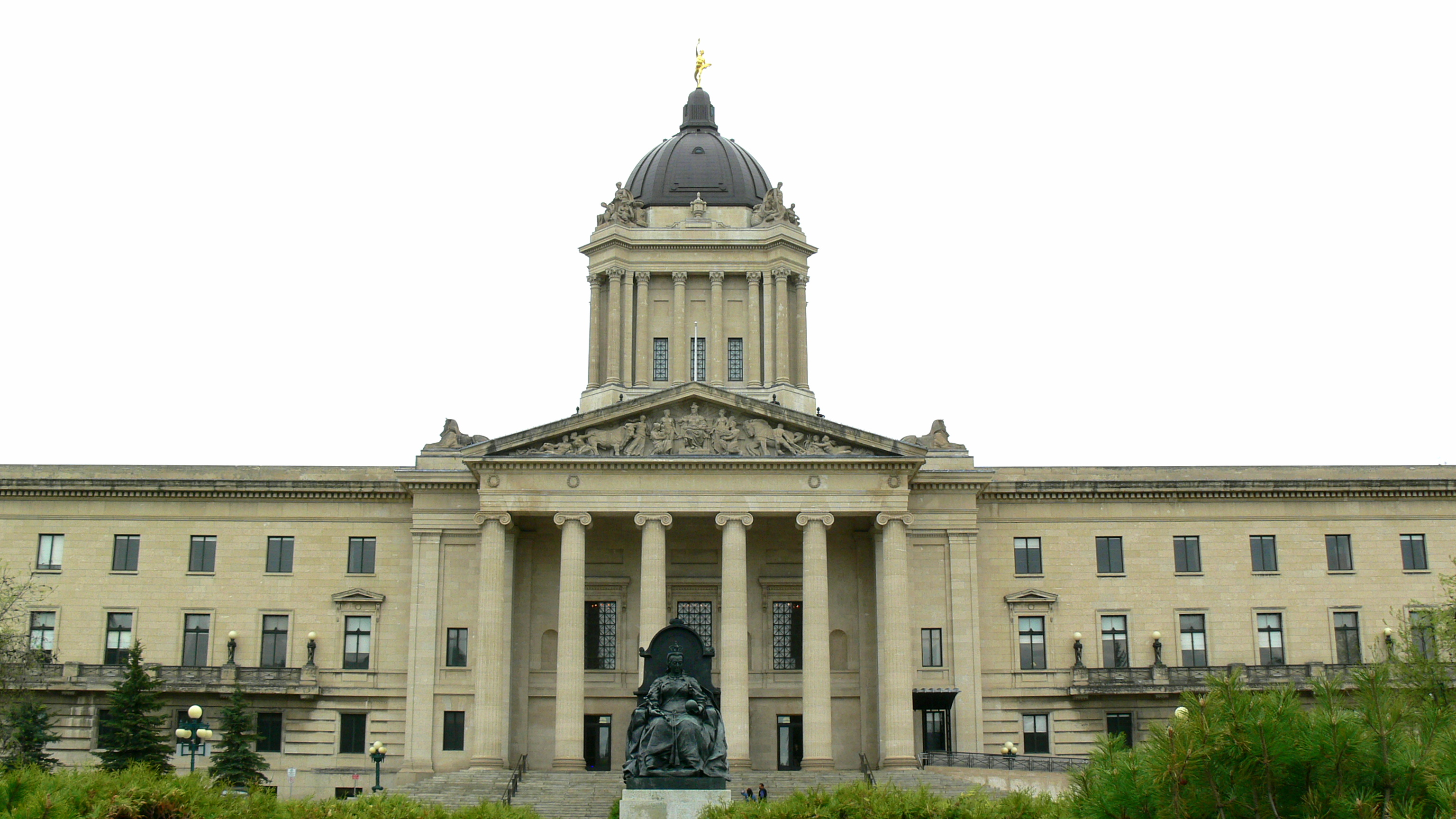
Manitoba's Provincial Legislature

=== Manitoba Legislature ===
Breland ran in the first general election held after Manitoba joined confederation in 1870. He won the electoral district of St. Francis Xavier East. In that election he defeated John Bruce who had served as President of the short lived Métis provisional government in 1869. The total vote was small as Breland won 31 votes to 18 for Bruce. Breland did not stand for re-election after the Assembly dissolved in 1874.

In this position, Breland was "instrumental" in legislature and negotiations which culminated in the signing of Treaty Number Four in 1874.

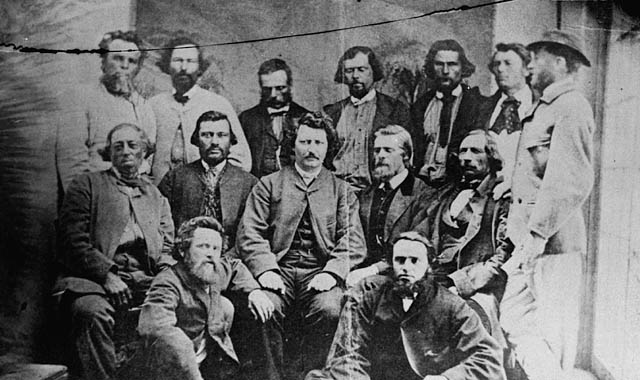
Many of Pascal Breland's peers and contemporaries were members of the Provisional Metis Government. Pierre Delorme is featured back row second from left.

=== Northwest Territories politician ===
Breland served two long terms as a politician in the Legislative Assembly of the Northwest Territories. He was first appointed to the Temporary North-West Council on December 28, 1872. Appointed by Adams G. Archibald who was the first lieutenant-governor of Manitoba & NWT as members of the Executive & Legislative councils for Rupert's Land and the North Western Territory, he served this position alongside fellow Metis Pierre Delorme. He served on the council until it was dissolved in 1876. He was re-appointed two years later on July 10, 1878, to serve on the 1st Council of the Northwest Territories. His re-appointment made him the only member of the original council to be re-appointed. He was re-appointed to the council due to demands of the Métis for government representation. Breland was the only member to reside from outside the territories during that period. In total he served 15 years as an appointed member.

== See also ==
- Métis
- St. François Xavier, Manitoba
- Council of Assiniboia
- Manitoba Legislative Assembly
- Temporary North-West Council
- Red River Resistance

Legislative Assembly of Manitoba
Preceded by New District	MLA St. Francis Xavier East; 1870–1874	Succeeded by Maxime Lepine
