= Battle of Seven Oaks =

1816 engagement of the Pemmican War

Coordinates: 49°55′55″N 97°07′16″W

- Part of the Pemmican War
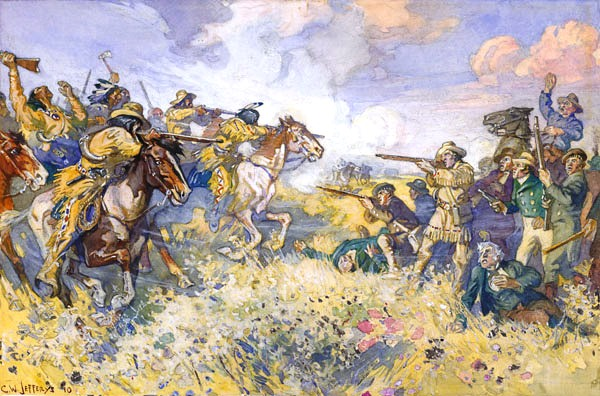
- An illustration of the battle by Charles William Jefferys
Date	19 June 1816; 210 years ago
Location	Near modern-day Winnipeg, Manitoba
Result	North West Company victory

Belligerents
North West Company; Métis	Hudson's Bay Company

Commanders and leaders
Cuthbert Grant	Robert Semple †

Strength
65	28

Casualties and losses
1 killed	21 killed

National Historic Site of Canada
- Official name: Battle of Seven Oaks National Historic Site of Canada
- Designated: 1920

The Battle of Seven Oaks—also known as the Seven Oaks Massacre and the Seven Oaks Incident—was a violent confrontation of the Pemmican War between the Hudson's Bay Company (HBC) and the North West Company (NWC) which occurred on 19 June 1816 near modern-day Winnipeg, Manitoba.

Resulting in a decisive victory for the NWC over their rivals in the North American fur trade, the confrontation was the climax in a long series of dispute in the Canadas.

The battle is also known as the Victory of the Frog Plain (French: la Victoire de la Grenouillère) among Métis People, whose members fought for the NWC during the battle. The event would mark one of the first times the Métis asserted themselves as la Nouvelle Nation ('the New Nation') and fly the flag of the Métis Nation.

== Background ==
For many years, the confluence of the Red and Assiniboine rivers—whose access had previously been controlled by the Assiniboine people—had been a meeting place for the fur trade in British North America (in modern-day Winnipeg, Manitoba). The Forks were also home to Ojibwe newcomers, Cree traders, and Métis buffalo hunters.

In the first decade of the 19th century, the Hudson’s Bay Company established a small depot across the river, at what is now St. Boniface. In 1809, the North West Company arrived to establish Fort Gibraltar at the Forks, which would be built in 1810 by John Wills, Cuthbert Grant’s brother-in-law.

During this time, Thomas Douglas, 5th Earl of Selkirk, sought to settle the Red River region, planning to bring Scottish settlers to the Forks and to establish the Red River Colony (also known as the Red River Settlement). In 1812, Selkirk’s men began building Fort Douglas on the west side of the Red River, downstream from the NWC’s Fort Gibraltar.

The Métis saw the Settlement as a threat to their way of life.

Because the project was so poorly planned, the settlers went hungry in 1812 and 1813. They would move south for winter at the junction of the Pembina and Red rivers, relying on the meat provided by the Métis and the NWC, as well as corn purchased from the Peguis Band.

On 8 January 1814, Miles MacDonell, governor of the Red River Colony, issued the Pemmican Proclamation, which prohibited the export of pemmican from the colony for the next year.

While Macdonell claimed that the proclamation was meant to guarantee adequate supplies for the Hudson's Bay Colony, the North West Company and the Métis—who supplied the NWC with pemmican—viewed it as a ploy by Selkirk to monopolize the commodity, which was important to the NWC. The Métis did not acknowledge the authority of the Red River Settlement, and the Pemmican Proclamation was a blow to both the Métis and North West Company. The NWC accused the HBC of unfairly monopolizing the fur trade.

=== Rising tensions ===
From 1815 through 1816, environmental conditions left pemmican in short supply, and the arrival of the Selkirk settlers made the shortage worse.

MacDonnell resigned as governor of the Red River Colony in 1815, after several conflicts and suffering from "severe emotional instability." He was replaced by Robert Semple, an American businessman with no previous experience in the fur trade.

On 7 June 1815, Métis leader and NWC clerk Cuthbert Grant established a Métis camp La Grenouillère (Frog Plain), 6.4 kilometres (4 mi) down the Red River from the HBC’s headquarters at Point Douglas. On June 10, during a shootout between Métis and remaining settlers at HBC’s Fort Douglas, one of Macdonell’s men was killed when a cannon exploded, and three others were wounded.

At this time, Cuthbert gained more men as many of Selkirk’s people went over to the Métis side, as well as the Irish who were initially hired to prepare the way for the settlement, as their contracts expired on June 1. The Métis thereafter increased their demands that the settlers leave the Forks, under order from the four chiefs of the Métis: Grant, William Shaw, Robert Bonhomme Montour, and Peter Bostonais Pangman.

Surveyor and Brandon House district manager Peter Fidler negotiated with the Métis chiefs at their camp at Frog Plain. On 20 June 1815, Pangman instructed Fidler that no colonists were to remain, but that a limited number of HBC servants might stay, as it was to the advantage of the Métis to have competing trading companies in the area.

In March 1816, the HBC seized and then destroyed Fort Gibraltar to prevent the NWC from trans-shipping pemmican from the Forks to their brigades coming in from Fort William on Lake Superior.

== Battle ==
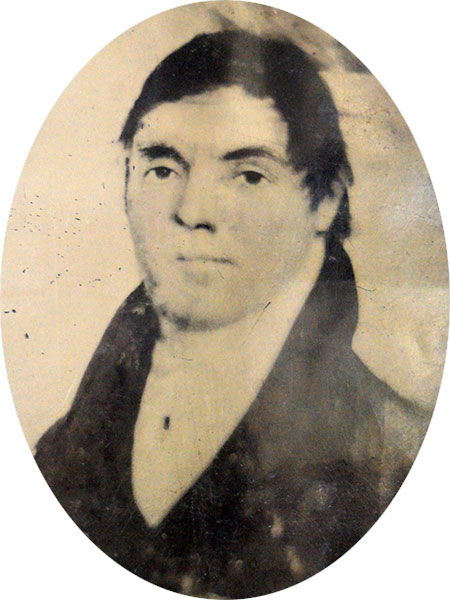
In 1816, Cuthbert Grant led a band of North West Company employees to seize a stolen supply of pemmican from the Hudson's Bay Company

On 19 June 1816, Cuthbert Grant led two groups of North West Company employees, a party of about 60 mounted Métis and First Nations freighters, towards Seven Oaks (known to the Métis as la Grenouillière, or Frog Plain) to escort a shipment of pemmican to Lake Winnipeg to supply NWC canoe brigades from Montreal which had to pass by en route to Athabasca.

In retaliation for the destruction of Fort Gibraltar, the group stopped a flotilla of HBC canoes coming down the Qu’Appelle River carrying pemmican for the Red River colony. Grant’s men seized the pemmican and then escorted the boats packed with supplies back up the Assiniboine River where they seized the Brandon House trading post. Grant’s men continued towards Lake Winnipeg divided in two groups, one on each side of the Assiniboine River.

HBC employees spotted one of Grant's groups, and HBC Governor Robert Semple and 26-28 men (a group of HBC men and settlers) went out on foot to confront them. Catching up with Grant's men at Seven Oaks, Semple challenged them.

The North West Company sent François-Firmin Boucher to speak to Semple's men. He and Semple argued, and a gunfight ensued when the settlers tried to arrest Boucher and seize his horse. Early reports said that the Métis fired the first shot and began the fray, but an ensuing investigation by Royal Commissioner William Bachelor Coltman determined with "next to certainty" that it was one of Semple's men who fired first.

The Métis were skilled sharpshooters and outnumbered Semple's forces by nearly 3 to 1. The Metis killed 21 men, including Governor Semple, while suffering only one fatality. On the Métis side, 16-year-old Joseph Letendre dit Batoche died, and Joseph Trottier was wounded. One of the main assumptions as to why many fewer of Grant's men were killed than Semple's is because the latter mistakenly thought they had won. After the first round of fire, the Métis threw themselves on their backs to reload their firearms, but the colonists perceived them to be on the ground because they were killed, and began celebrating. Semple’s men were then taken by surprise when the Métis, having reloaded, rose up and resumed firing.

== Aftermath ==
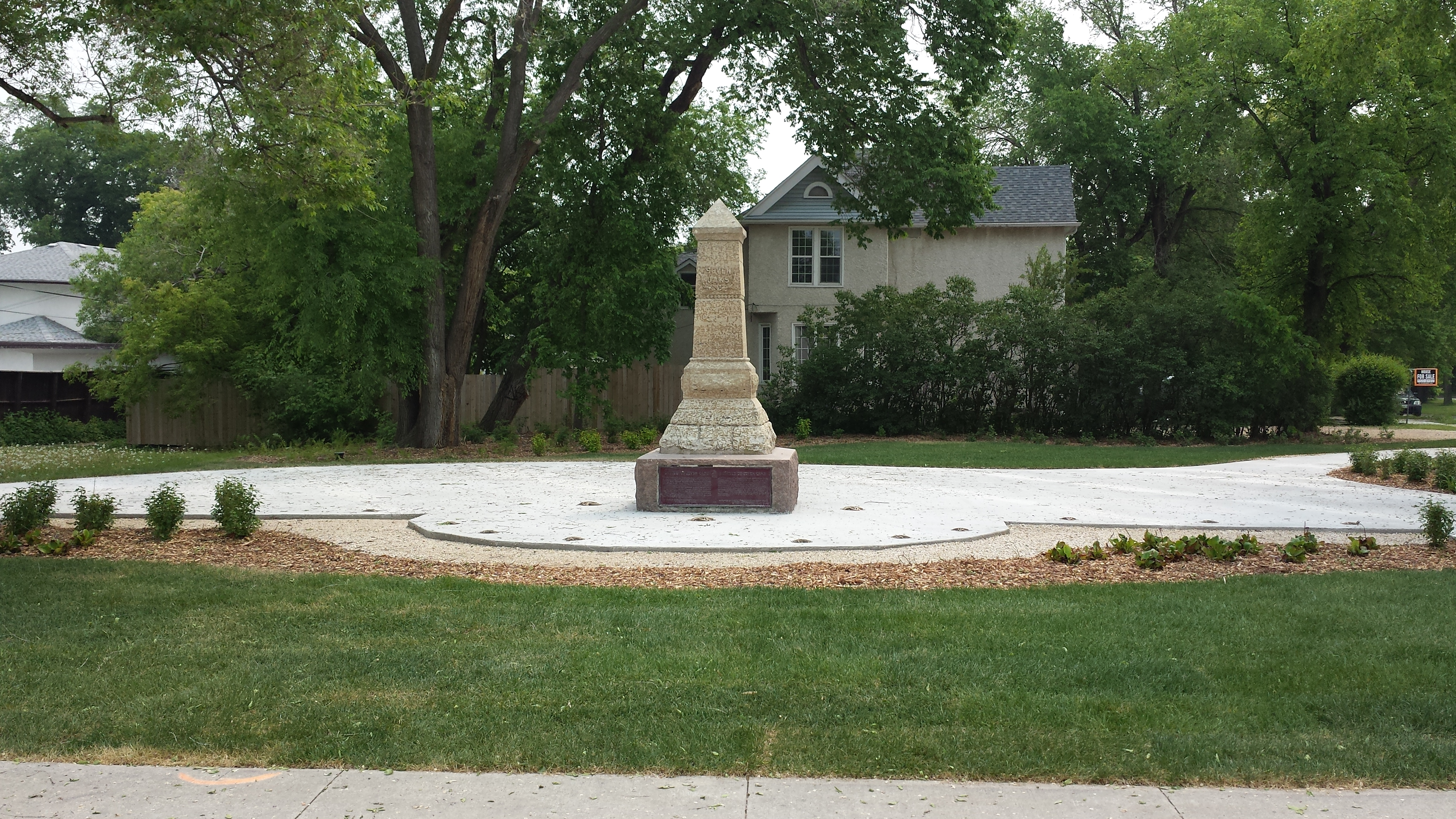
An obelisk monument to commemorate the battle was erected in 1891 at West Kildonan, Winnipeg.

According to oral tradition, the Métis gathered that night in their Frog Plain camp to celebrate their victory. There, Métis poet and balladeer Pierre Falcon, Grant’s brother-in-law, wrote “La Chanson de la Grenouillère” about the battle.

Demoralized from the losses, the settlers gathered their belongings the day after the battle and sailed north for Norway House, leaving the Métis in command of the settlement, having seized Fort Douglas.

The battle marked one of the first documented times the Red River Métis declared their nationhood, asserting themselves as la Nouvelle Nation ('the New Nation') with rights to trade as they wished and travel freely on their own land. It was also one of the first times that the flag of the Métis Nation was flown.

The British government called for a special inquiry into the incident, and appointed Lieutenant Colonel William Bachelor Coltman as Royal Commissioner, who set his investigation in motion in May 1817. Delivered to the British House of Commons on 24 June 1819, Coltman's report exonerated the Métis, concluding that the first shot was fired at François Boucher from Semple’s side. The fighting did not last longer than 15 minutes.

Coltman also concluded that, before the battle, neither side intended to engage in a fight. He also argued that Selkirk and Semple should have known that their enforcement of the Pemmican Proclamation showed "a blameable carelessness as to the consequence, on a subject likely to endanger both the peace of the country and the lives of individuals."

On 12 August 1816, Selkirk and a force of 90 soldiers who had been discharged from the De Meuron and De Watteville regiments arrived from eastern Canada and captured the North West Company headquarters and supply base at Fort William. Selkirk attempted to prosecute several members of the NWC for murder and kept Boucher in prison for nearly two years without specific charges. The NWC men were tried at York, Upper Canada, in 1818. All trials ended in acquittals, and the remaining charges were dropped. Members of the North West Company counter-sued Selkirk, whose health and influence subsequently declined. Selkirk died in 1820, and the two companies merged in 1821. The Hudson's Bay Company gave Cuthbert Grant an annual salary in 1828 and the position of "warden of the plains of Red River."

== Commemorations ==
The Manitoba Historical Society erected an obelisk monument in 1891 commemorating the battle at the intersection of Main Street and Rupertsland Boulevard in the Winnipeg district of West Kildonan, the approximate centre of the battle site. The site was designated a National Historic Site of Canada in 1920.

Parks Canada installed new interpretive signs as part of their reconciliation with the Métis, and the Seven Oaks Park was re-landscaped. The site was officially reopened on 19 June 2016 to mark the 200th anniversary of the battle.
