= Pierre Falcon =

Canadian Métis fur trader and musician (1793–1876)

- Born: 4 June 1793; Somerset House
- Died: 21 October 1876 (aged 83); Saint-François-Xavier
- Occupations: fur trader, farmer, magistrate
- Known for: composed La Chanson de la Grenouillère

Pierre Falcon (sometimes referred to as Pierriche, meaning 'Pierre the rhymer'; 4 June 1793 – 21 October 1876) was a Métis fur trader and pioneer living in what is today known as Manitoba. He was also a well known composer and singer.

Falcon Lake located in the Whiteshell Provincial Park in south-eastern Manitoba was named after Pierre Falcon.

== Early life ==
Pierre Falcon was born at Somerset House, also called Elbow Fort, in the Swan River Valley, on 4 June 1793. His father, Pierre Jean-Baptiste Falcon was a fur trader and clerk with the North West Company in the Red River district and his mother was a Cree Woman, the daughter of Pas au Traverse. Falcon was taken to La Prairie, Lower Canada, as a child and was baptized at L’Acadie, Quebec, on 18 June 1798. While in Quebec, Falcon stayed with his family, possibly his uncle Francois, and learned to read and write.

In 1808, at 15, Falcon came back to Manitoba to become a clerk for the North West Company. In 1812, he married a woman named Marie (possibly Marie-Suzette), who was also the sister of the Métis leader Cuthbert Grant. They had four sons and six daughters whom Falcon supported as a successful rancher. One of his sons, Jean Baptiste Falcon, led the St. François Xavier (White Horse Plain) group of buffalo hunters in 1851 and defended the camp from the Sioux at the Battle of Grand Coteau (North Dakota).

== Songs ==
In 1816, Pierre Falcon, then 23, celebrated the victory of the Métis at the Battle of Seven Oaks in his song La Chanson de la Grenouillère. The song and the music became so popular among the Métis that it was still sung 150 years later and was published in 1866 in Le Foyer canadien and again in 1914 in Les Cloches de Saint-Boniface.

- Songs of Falcon 1: The Battle of Seven Oaks and Lord Selkirk at Fort William
- Songs of Falcon 2: The Buffalo Hunt and The Dickson Song

== Re-settlement ==
Falcon continued to work for the North West company until its merger with the Hudson's Bay in 1821. Falcon served the new company until 1825, when his family along with several other Métis families resettled in Grantown (later known as Saint-François-Xavier) on the White Horse Plain, under the leadership of Cuthbert Grant. An 1838 census listed Falcon as having 30 acres (120,000 m^{2}) of land under cultivation. By 1849 he was shown with only 15 acres (61,000 m^{2}) as the remainder had been divided amongst his sons. In 1855, Falcon became a local magistrate.

He died on 21 October 1876, followed a year later by his wife on 11 October 1877.
