= William Coltman (mayor) =

Mayor of Waimate 1893–1895

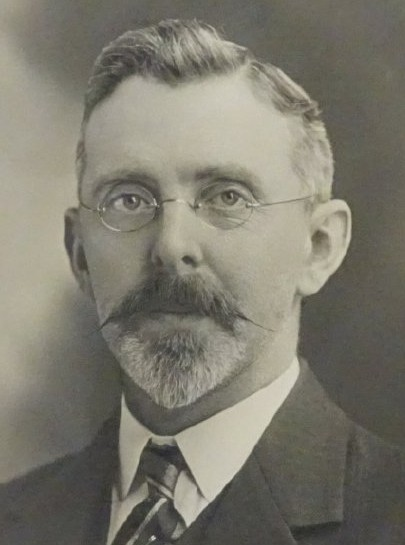
- Coltman in 1911, by Herman John Schmidt

8th Mayor of Waimate
- In office 18 December 1893 – 16 December 1895
- Preceded by: George H. Graham
- Succeeded by: Charles V. Clarke

Personal details
- Born: 24 September 1862 Birmingham, Warwickshire, England
- Died: 18 June 1940 (aged 77) Auckland, New Zealand
- Resting place: Waikumete Cemetery
- Spouse: Mary McCallum (m. 1884; died 1885) Mary Jane Russell (m. 1889)
- Children: 7
- Parent(s): William Coltman; Maria Louisa Hall
- Occupation: Watchmaker; jeweller; councillor
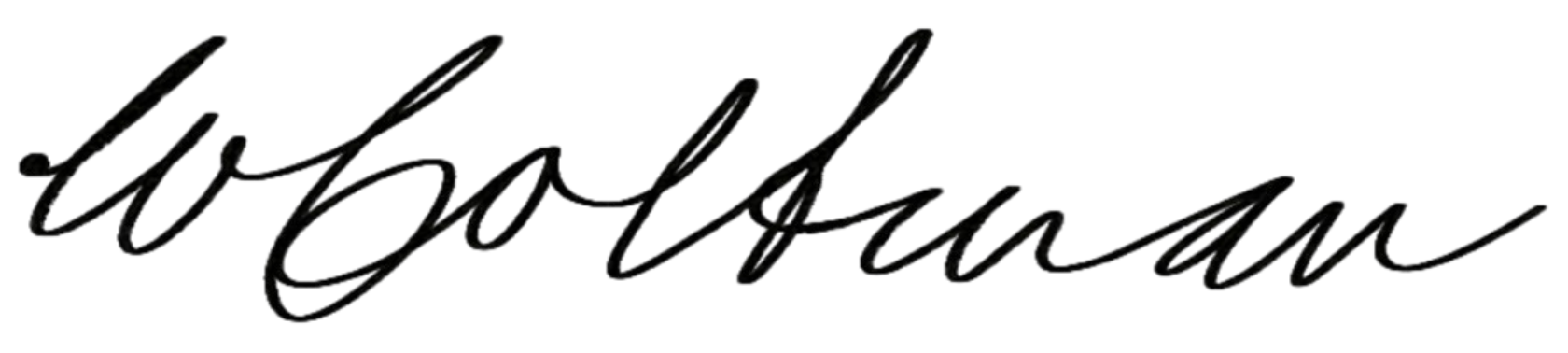
- Signature

William Coltman (24 September 1862 – 18 June 1940) also known as William Coltman Jr. was a New Zealand jeweller, watchmaker, and politician who served as the eighth mayor of Waimate. He held the office from 1893 to 1895.

== Early life ==
William Coltman was born in Birmingham, Warwickshire, on 24 September 1862, to William Coltman, a watchmaker and jeweller, and his wife Maria Louisa Coltman (née Hall). His parents had been married at Coventry, on 21 June 1857. Coltman was the second of ten children, five brothers and four sisters. He received his early education in Yorkshire, and learned the trade of watchmaking under his father's tuition. Most of his early life in England was spent at his father’s jewellery store on Bradford Road, Dewsbury. In 1881, he emigrated with his parents to Lyttelton, New Zealand aboard the Waimate.

Initially, Coltman worked at his father’s jewellery stores (the original office in Geraldine, and a branch in Temuka) until April 1885, when his father transferred all interest in the Temuka branch to him. On 2 March 1886, a fire broke out in Coltman’s shop on Main Road, Temuka, fortunately it was extinguished by locals before the fire brigade arrived. Later that year the property was sold at auction.

On 14 September 1887, his mother died at 50 years old. Coltman stayed active in various positions in public offices. In 1888, he moved to Waimate.

== Political career ==
Coltman was first elected onto the Waimate Borough Council on 2 September 1890. He retired from the council in September 1893.

Later, he was elected without opposition as mayor of Waimate on 17 November 1893. He was officially sworn in on 18 December 1893. After a successful two years as mayor, Charles Vincent Clarke succeeded him in that position on 16 December 1895.

On 30 December 1896 Coltman rejoined the Waimate Borough Council. On 15 September 1908, after nearly 20 years of service on the Waimate Borough Council, he resigned as councillor due to his move to Auckland.

== Later life ==
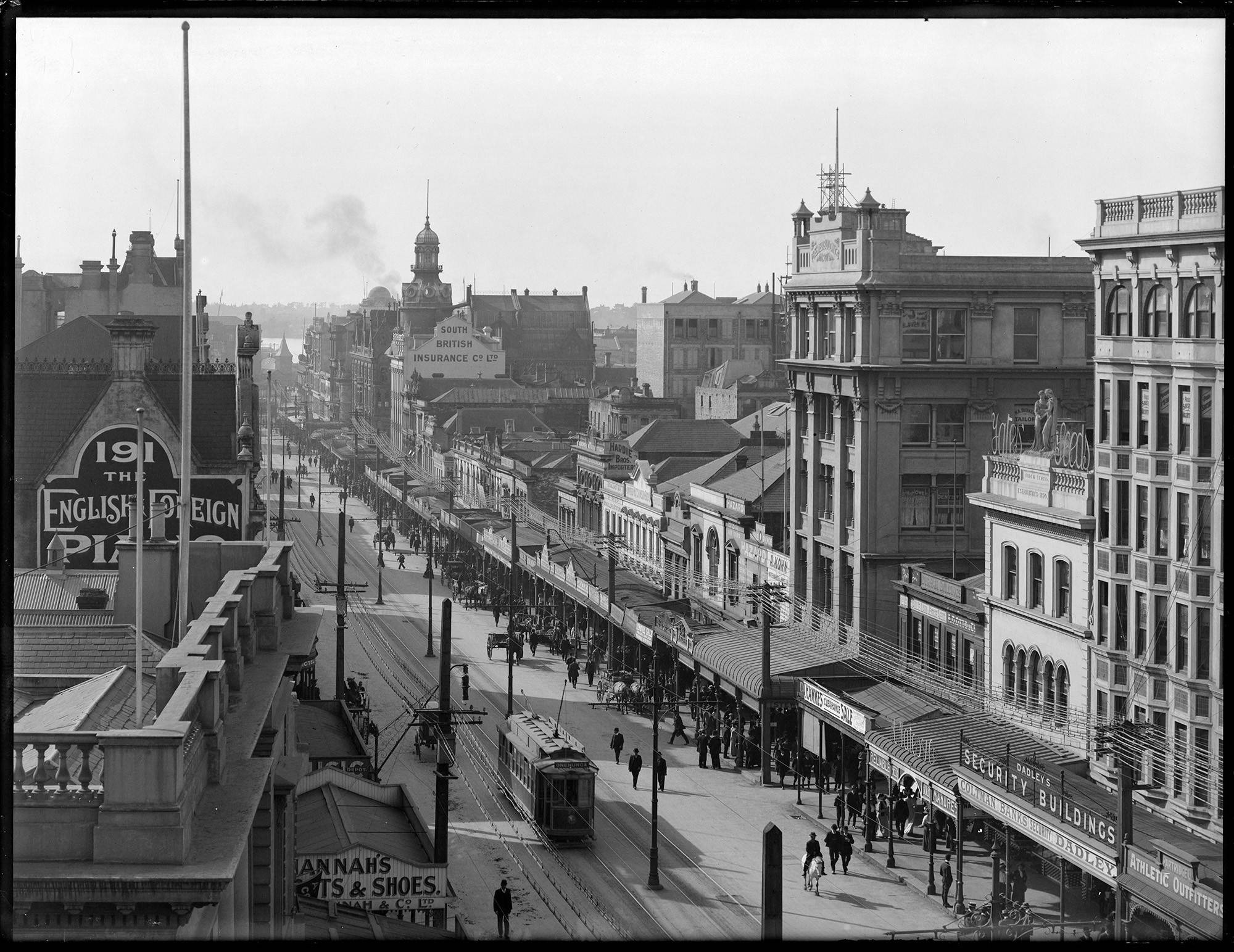
Queen Street in 1912, Coltman's jewellers is visible bottom right

On 23 June 1908 Coltman left Waimate on a few weeks’ business trip to Auckland. He returned from Auckland on 10 July 1908, with a sense of awe for the condition and future prospects of the city. As a result of his visit, he was determined to shift his business to Auckland within three months. Much of the town of Waimate was saddened to hear of Coltman's leave, including the Mayor of Waimate, Norton Francis, who four days after Coltman's declaration expressed deep regret to hear that he would be leaving and wished him success in his future endeavours in Auckland. After selling his home, attending various farewell parties, and resigning from several public offices, Coltman and his family left on the train for Auckland on 2 October 1908, with a large crowd bidding them farewell at the railway station. A list of all the positions Coltman held at the time of his move to Auckland were listed in the Waimate Advertiser:

"Representative member on South Canterbury Hospital and Charitable Aid Board from 1894 to September, 1908, with one year's exception; chairman and member of Waimate High School Board, (three years Chairman); member Waimate Hospital Board, about five years; chairman of High School Committee; Waimate Rifle Volunteers, enrolled as private 1890 and resigned as Captain after 13 years; Knox Church treasurer and choirmaster, about 17 years; Waimate Brass Band, Drum Major at several contests; Waimate Choral Society, first conductor; member of Waimate Dramatic Club; President of Waimate Football Club; President of Waimate Harriers' Club; President Waimate Bowling and Tennis Club, President of the New Club; Justice of the Peace; original director of the Waimate Gas and Coal Company."

Soon after his arrival in Auckland, Coltman set up his business as a watchmaker and jeweller at 194 Queen St. He served as the first president of the Auckland Justices' Association, a president of the New Zealand Bowling Association, the Auckland Bowling Association, the Auckland Automobile Association, the Retail Watchmakers and Jewellers' Association, and the Auckland Rotary Club, as well as serving as the chairman of the Royal Auckland Choir, of which he was treasurer for twenty years. In matters of his religion he was a Presbyterian and was active in his church. He died at the age of 77 at his home in Courtville Flats, Auckland, on 18 June 1940.

== Family ==
On 3 June 1884 Coltman married Mary McCallum. They had one son together who was born prematurely:

1. William Archibald Coltman, b. 9 February 1885, Temuka; d. 15 February 1885, Temuka.

Mary died at 23 years old on 28 May 1885, at their residence in Temuka.

On 1 August 1889 Coltman married Mary Jane Russell at Temuka, she was the daughter of Archibald Russell of that town. Together they had six sons:

1. Archibald Russell Coltman, b. 1890; d. 11 July 1948, Rotorua.
2. William Hall Denley Coltman, b. 24 February 1892, Waimate; d. 14 January 1946, Hamilton.
3. Sgt. Cyril Warren Coltman, b. 20 June 1893, Waimate; d. 14 July 1916. Killed in action during the Battle of the Somme.
4. Bertram Howard Coltman, b. 30 March 1901, Waimate; d. 13 June 1967, Napier.
5. Grahame Coltman, b. 23 February 1903, Waimate; d. 24 July 1960, Auckland.
6. John Morton Coltman, b. 31 August 1904, Waimate; d. 28 February 1976, Auckland.

Through his brother, Thomas Hall Coltman, he is related to New Zealand rugby union player Liam Coltman.
