= Cuthbert Grant =

Métis leader (1793–1854)

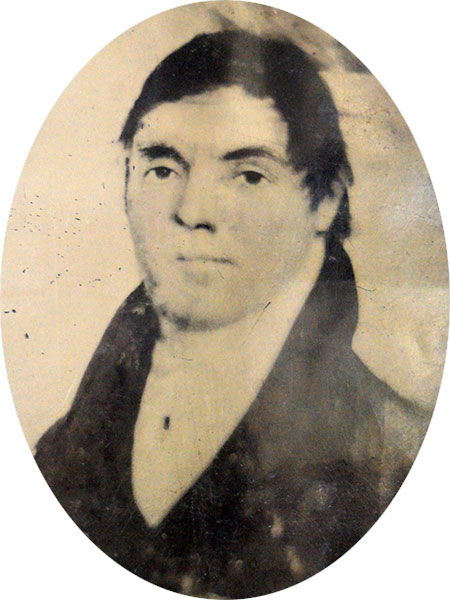
Cuthbert Grant

Cuthbert "James" Grant (1793 – July 15, 1854) was a Métis leader of the early 19th century who participated in the Pemmican War as an employee of the North West Company.

== Life ==
Cuthbert Grant was born in about 1793 at Fort de la Rivière Tremblante, a North West Company trading post located near the present-day town of Togo, Saskatchewan, where his father was a manager. His father was Cuthbert Grant Sr., a North West Company partner, and his mother was Métis. In 1801, at the age of 8, he was sent to be educated, perhaps to Scotland, though this is uncertain. It is not known exactly when he returned to Western Canada, but in 1812, he entered the service of the North West Company at the age of 19. He then travelled with the spring brigade to the Pays d'en Haut, the "high country" of the northwest.

He was recognized as a leader of the Métis people, and became involved in the bitter struggle between the Nor'westers and the Hudson's Bay Company stemming from the Pemmican Proclamation, which forbade anyone from exporting pemmican from the Red River Colony. The capture and destruction of the North West Company's Fort Gibraltar in 1816, caused further anger at the HBC from the Nor'westers and the local Métis. This led to the bloody encounter known as the Battle of Seven Oaks, where Robert Semple and 21 colonists from the Red River Colony were killed.

Despite this, when the two rival companies merged in 1821 under the name the Hudson's Bay Company, the new governor, Sir George Simpson, requested Grant to head a Métis settlement of some 2,000 people situated some 16 miles west of the Red River Colony on the Assiniboine River. The settlement was to be known as Grantown for many years then was renamed St. François Xavier after the patron saint of the town.

By 1825 wheat was becoming an important food crop and although there were several windmills in operation in the area, Cuthbert Grant was the first to undertake the construction of a watermill. His mill was completed on Sturgeon Creek in 1829. While the exact location is not known, it is probable that it was close to where the Portage Trail crossed the creek; and it is altogether likely that the dam was used as a bridge for crossing the creek during the season of high water. Unfortunately the dam proved unequal to the spring floods and for three successive years it was washed out. Grant finally abandoned the site and moved his machinery to Grantown where he constructed a successful windmill. There is a mill called Grant's Old Mill that is located in Winnipeg.

In 1828, the Hudson's Bay Company placed him in charge of the defence of the Red River Colony. As “Warden of the Plains,” he received an annual salary of £200 and the duty of preventing illicit trade in furs. On 12 February 1835 he was appointed a Justice of the Peace for the Fourth District of Assiniboia and on 20 March 1839, one of the two Sheriffs of Assiniboia.He later became a sheriff and magistrate in the District of Assiniboia.

On July 15, 1854, Cuthbert died from injuries sustained after falling from his horse.

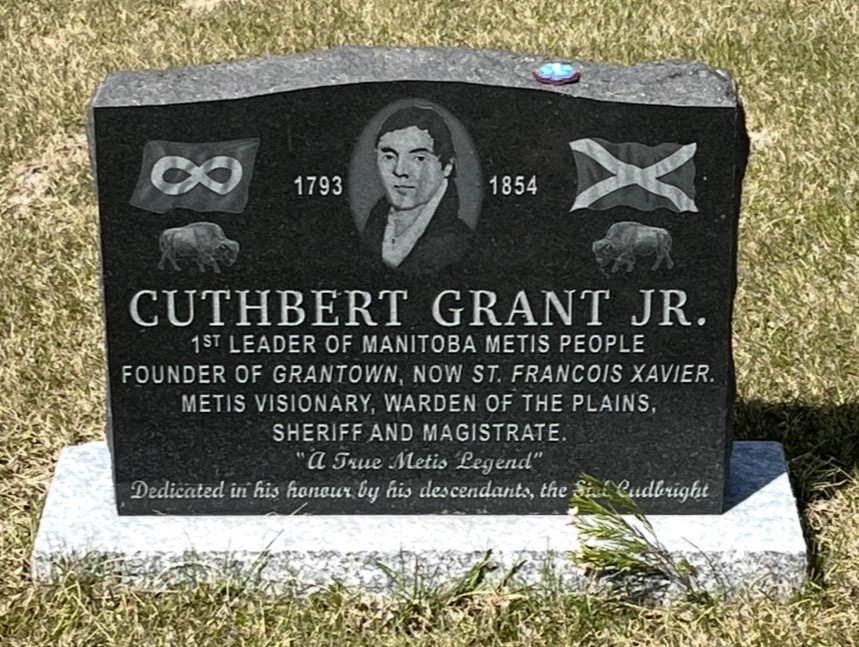
Tombstone of Cuthbert Grant in St. Francois Xavier, Manitoba.

== Family and descendants ==
Cuthbert Grant was known to have been married three times, he had at least three sons and six daughters.

His first wife was Elizabeth "Bethsy" McKay, the sister of John Richards McKay and daughter of John McKay and Mary Favell. Grant and Bethsy courted through correspondence; the pair were married on May 22, 1814, at Fort Gibraltar. Their marriage produced one son, James (b. circa 1815). However, while Cuthbert was on trial for his part in Seven Oaks, both Bethsy and their son James disappeared. Their fate is unknown.

In 1820, Cuthbert was involved in a mariage du pays with Marie Desmaris. From this union, a daughter Maria was born (b. July 15, 1820). (Maria would later marry Pascal Breland, a magistrate at St. François Xavier.)

Around 1823, Cuthbert married Marie McGillis, the daughter of Angus McGillis and an aboriginal woman named Marguerite. Cuthbert and Marie-Marguerite were the parents of 11 children: Elise, Charles, Pierre, Elizabeth, Marguerite, Cuthbert Louis Marie, Cuthbert, James, Sophia, Caroline, Jessie, and Julie Rose Marie Grant.

Marie survived her husband's death by 18 months. She was buried on April 30, 1856, in St.-Francois-Xavier.

Lord Strathspey, the head of Clan Grant, officially declared Cuthbert Grant a member of his clan at a ceremony held in Winnipeg in July 2012. This created a new sept of his descendants in Canada.

== Legacy ==
Grant Avenue in Winnipeg and the Cuthbert Grant rose, developed by Agriculture Canada and introduced in 1967, are named in his honour.

During the 1960s, Canadian-born James Bond film producer Harry Saltzman attempted to make a feature film about Grant that would have been shot in Canada. Initially the biographical film was to have starred Sean Connery as Grant.
