= Po (food) =

Korean jerky varieties

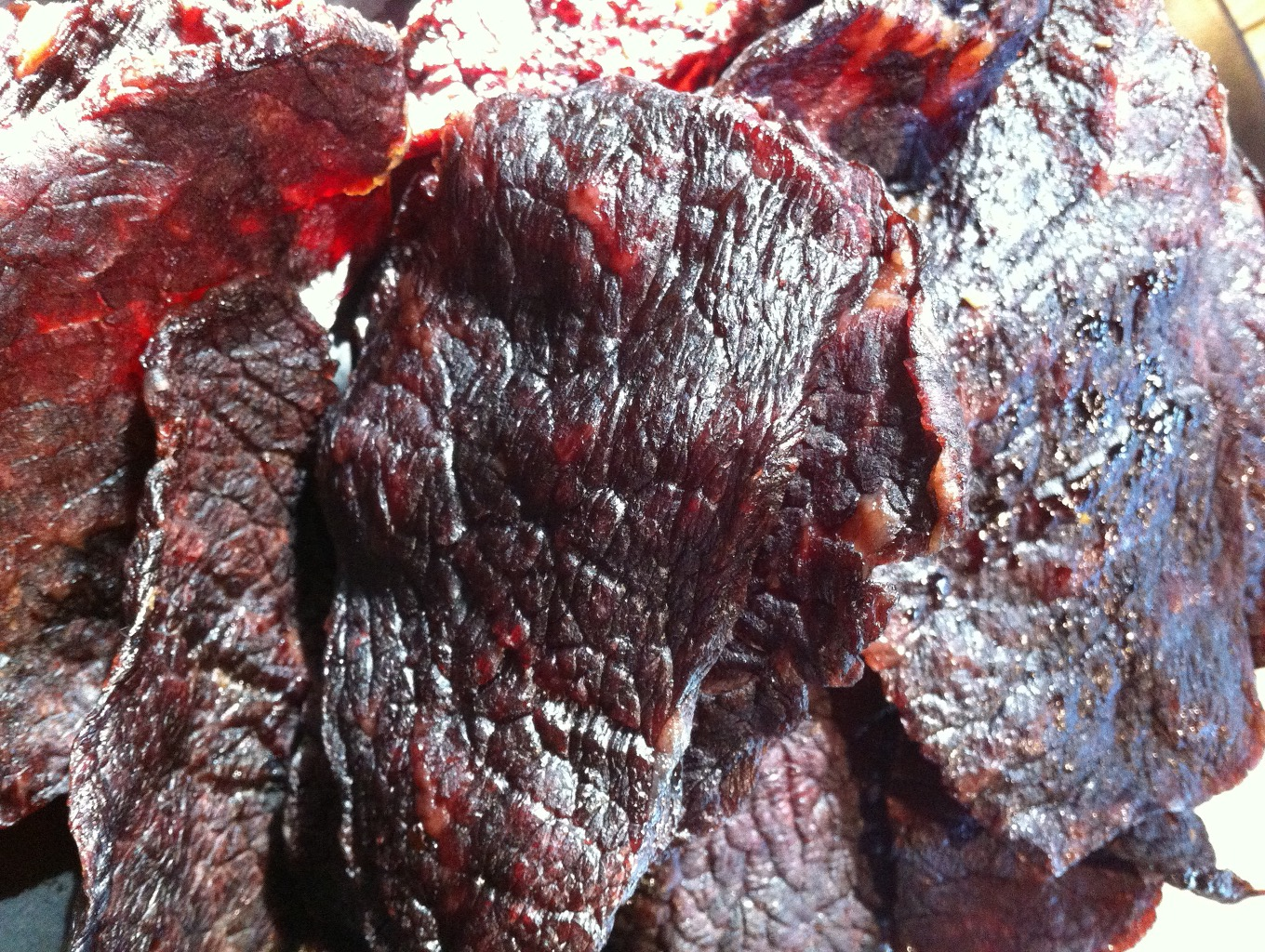
- Hanu-yukpo (dried Korean beef)
- Type: Dried meat or fish
- Place of origin: Korea
- Associated cuisine: Korean cuisine
- Similar dishes: Jerky

Korean name
- Hangul: 포
- Hanja: 脯
- RR: po
- MR: p'o
- IPA: [pʰo]

Po (Korean: 포) is thin strips or sheets of dried meat and fish used in Korean cuisine. Po, which is made from meats including beef, pork, venison and poultry; and seafoods including whitefish, eel, squid, octopus, shrimp and crab; is eaten as snack food, banchan (food accompanying bap) or anju (food accompanying alcohol). Po is prepared for traditional occasions such as pyebaek (formal greetings from the newlyweds after the wedding ceremony) and jesa (ancestral rite).

== Name ==
The Sino-Korean word po (포) can be written with the hanja 脯, which in other East Asian languages and cuisines can also mean preserved fruit.

== History ==
History of po is thought to date back to pre-historic hunter-gatherer societies.

According to the 1145 historical text Samguk sagi, in the 2nd month of 683, the King Sinmun of Silla sent 135 carts of rice, wine, oil, honey, jang (soy sauce, soybean paste), vinegar, and po to Kim Heum-un's house for his daughter's wedding.

Northern Song Chinese scholar Wu Ji (?–1142) described Goryeo-era Koreans seasoning nokpo (녹포; 鹿脯, dried venison) with cinnamon.

During the Joseon period, po made in governmental offices was called gwanpo (관포; 官脯, "governmental po"). Among them, large pyeonpo that was made in Bongsangsi (Office of Sacrificial Rites) for jehang (governmental jesa) was called jopo (조포; 造脯). Geonpo used for jehyang was called jungpo (중포; 中脯). At Korean New Year, it was common for provincial officials to send pochok (포촉; 脯燭, "po and candles") to their relatives and officials in the central government. Extravagant banquets were referred to as yuk-san-po-rim (육산포림; 肉山脯林), literally meaning "po mountains, meat forests". Beef po was also often used to make upo-dasik (우포다식; 牛脯茶食), a kind of dasik (tea food). The 18th-century book Sasojeol (Elementary Matters of Etiquette for Scholar Families), which was written by the Joseon scholar Yi Deok-mu (1741–1793), states; "Do not frequently smell fish or seafood po". Cheolli-po (천리포; 千里脯, "thousand-ri po"), made from meats marinated for a day in wine, vinegar, and salt, was prepared for long journeys. (1 ri is around 393 m (1,289 ft), and 1,000 ri is 393 km (244 mi).)

== Varieties ==
Meat or fish that is thinly sliced and dried is usually called geonpo (건포; 乾脯), while meat that is pounded flat and dried is called pyeonpo (편포; 片脯). Dried meat in general can be referred to as poyuk (포육; 脯肉), with yuk (육; 肉) meaning "meat", while the differently ordered compound yukpo (육포; 肉脯) refers to dried beef slices. Dried fish is called eopo (어포; 魚脯) with eo (어; 魚) meaning "fish".

When the meat is seasoned with salt and pepper, it is called yeompo (염포; 鹽脯), while the dried meats seasoned or marinated with soy sauce-based seasonings are called jangpo (장포; 醬脯), pyeonpo (편포; 片脯), sanpo (산포; 散脯), or yakpo (약포; 藥脯), according to the methods.

=== Meat ===
- Nokpo (녹포; 鹿脯) – venison
- Jangpo (장포; 獐脯) – Siberian roe deer venison
- Jeyuk-po (제육포) – pork, salted and dried, parboiled in diluted wine, and dried again
- Yukpo (육포; 肉脯) – beef

By method

- Baepo (배포; 焙脯) – thinly sliced beef or pork, seasoned and dried on baerong (배롱; 焙籠) on fire
- Jangpo (장포; 醬脯) – seasoned with aged soy sauce, massaged, and dried
- Jangpo (장포; 醬脯) – thick slices of lean meat is repeatedly grilled to sear skin, beaten with bats, and seasoned with aged soy sauce, until thoroughly cooked
- Pyeonpo (편포; 片脯) – meat is pounded flat with knife, and dried
- Sanpo (산포; 散脯) – meat sliced into pieces and sun-dried
- Yakpo (약포; 藥脯) – meat is thinly sliced, seasoned with soy sauce, oil, sugar, and pepper, massaged, and dried on sokuri

=== Poultry ===
- Geowi-po (거위포) – goose
- Gireogi-po (기러기포) – wild goose
- Chiyuk-po (치육포; 雉肉脯) – pheasant

=== Seafood ===
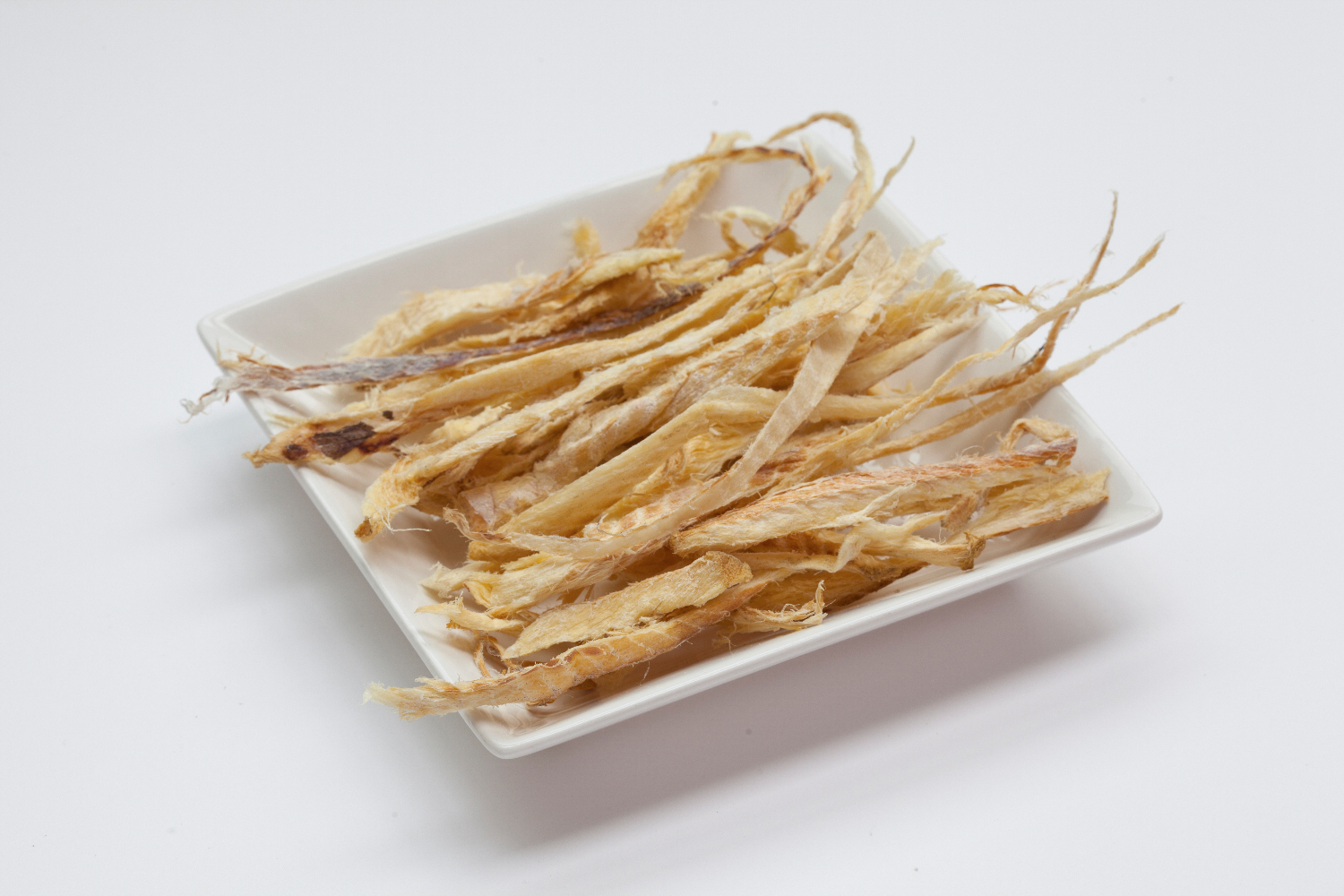
Bugeo-po (dried Alaska pollock)

- Chupo (추포; 秋脯) – squid
- Eopo (어포; 魚脯) – thinly sliced fish
- Gepo (게포) – fiddler crab meat
- Saengseon-po (생선포; 生鮮脯) – fish
- Saeu-po (새우포) – shrimp, halved, marinated, dried and grilled

Pressed

- Jwipo (쥐포) – thread-sail filefish, dried and pressed
- Muneo-po (문어포; 文魚脯) – giant octopus, dried and pressed
- Ojingeo-po (오징어포) – squid, dried and pressed

=== Others ===
- Sapo (사포; 蛇脯) – snake meat, eaten as folk remedy in the past

== Uses ==
Po made from various meats, fish, and seafood are eaten as snack food, banchan (food accompanying bap) or anju (food accompanying sul). Salted and dried meat po are eaten as po-jaban (포자반), a salty banchan. Crab and other seafood po are beaten, puffed, seasoned with soy sauce and oil, and eaten as muchim. Fish po are seasoned with soy sauce or gochujang and are grilled as gui.

Po are one of the foods prepared for traditional occasions such as pyebaek (formal greetings from the newlyweds after the wedding ceremony) and jesa (ancestral rite). Po and sikhye (rice punch) used for jesa is called pohye (포혜; 脯醯). Often, po is put on the left side of the jesasang (table for ancestral rites) and sikhye is put on the right; this is referred to as jwa-po-u-hye (좌포우혜; 左脯右醯), literally meaning "left po, right sikhye". Another related term is ju-gwa-po-hye (주과포혜; 酒果脯醯), literally meaning "wine, fruit, po, sikhye", which refers to simple offerings for jesa.

== See also ==
- List of meat dishes
