= Nasalo =

Tradition in Gilgit-Baltistan

Nasalo or Nos is one of the oldest traditions in parts of Gilgit-Baltistan, in the northmost territories of Pakistan. In the winter (yoono), animals such as the Tibetan yak (Shina: bepo), oxen, and cows etc. are slaughtered, for dried meat and other processed food items prepared with the meat, such as warkì or ghittey, a kind of sausage. (Pork is not used.), and in seasonal temperatures that are below freezing, the sausages are left to dry. The food items produced during this initial phase of winter are used throughout the winter to prepare different recipes.

It is a preventive measure to survive during severe winters. The tradition of seasoned meat is found in other cultures in the world, especially in most of the countries in Europe. The concept of seasoning and drying is more emphasised in the case of Nasalo.

== History ==
According to local sources, the tradition of Nasalo during the reign of cannibal king Shribadat.

=== Legend of cannibal king ===
Shribadat or Shribat is mentioned as the last Buddhist or Hindu king in the history books of Gilgit-Baltistan. The festival of Nasalo is celebrated in the month of the death anniversary of the cannibal king. The legend says the king was a adam-khor (cannibal) and fed on infants. In medieval times it was believed that if people stopped sacrificing animals, he would return again with evil thoughts of killing infants to feed himself. Each family sacrifices an animal on that day every year. In various parts of the region in the countryside, the festival is still celebrated at its fullest. The celebration starts in the early morning of 21 December, when all the heads of household gather at an untilled field holding flambeaus of pine wood. The flaming sticks are then collected to form a conflagration, a bonfire made of flambeaus commemorating the death of the cannibal king Shri Badat.

Meanwhile, the people march towards the venue singing folk songs, and the entire place resounds with music by local musicians, and dances are performed in a circle around the conflagration.

The festival braces up the mountain folk to live on in the harsh winter, which exceeds four months in parts of the region. They forget about the cold and freezing wintry night and enjoy the festivities. Traditions are strictly followed and the animals are slaughtered on 21 December.

In the early days of the festival, various dishes including those made of the parts of the slaughtered animal which are not preserved for Nasalo, especially liver, are served.

=== Nasalo today ===
Due to urbanisation, inflation, poverty, and many local butcher shops that often provide meat, the festival is observed less frequently. Moreover, dishes prepared with Nasalo meat are offered in restaurants and hotels in the region during the winter. The tradition is becoming commercialised with the passage of time.

== Nasalo preparation ==
Sheep are slaughtered for mutton in the first half of December and for cattle for beef in the second half of the month, following the tradition. The dried meat is then cooked during the months of January and February, generally the coldest months in the region. As part of the tradition of Nasalo, households slaughter an animal – yak, goat, sheep or an ox, based on availability and capacity. Two methods are used to prepare the meat for seasoning: lengthy meat slices or entire shoulders or legs, or in amore processed form called warkì or ghittey.

Warki or ghittey are types of sausage (not of pork) usually produced by filling a natural gut of mutton or beef (locally called chitti) with a mixture of flesh and fat cut into pieces (or minced) and mixed with salt. The resulting mixture is usually added to vinegar and other spices, such as pepper, chilli and coriander. It can be eaten fresh (after cooking) or dried (then seasoned). Apart from this, boneless beef or mutton is cut into lengthy slices and marinated with these spices, or just salt, and are hung in a cellar for seasoning.

Meat of Yak is majorly used in ritual of Nasalo. The yak meat is considered a very healthy proteinaceous food as it contains a couple low quantity of cholesterol. Once the Nasalo meat is seasoned it can be used in any season as the process enables the meat to resist infestation. Moreover, the meat is used and overused during entire winter season that works as elixir as warm foods items prepared with the nasalo meat are served and it is believed that the food prevents people from getting sick during winters.
