= Yukpo =

Korean dried meat strips

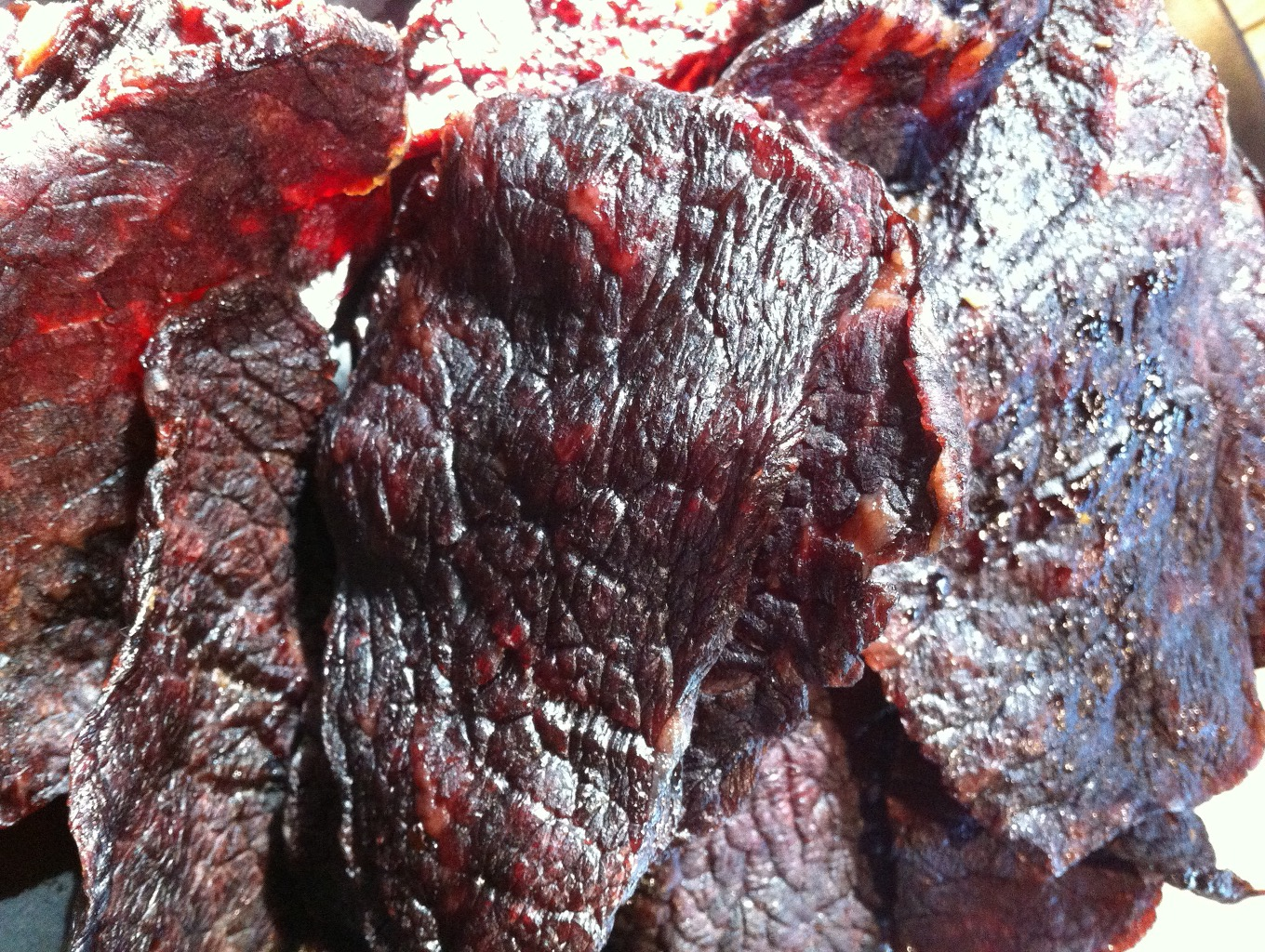
- Hanu-yukpo (dried Korean beef)
- Type: Po; Dried meat
- Place of origin: Korea
- Associated cuisine: Korean cuisine
- Main ingredients: Beef
- Similar dishes: Beef jerky

Korean name
- Hangul: 육포
- Hanja: 肉脯
- RR: yukpo
- MR: yukp'o
- IPA: [juk̚.pʰo]

Yukpo (Korean: 육포) is a type of po or dried meat, made from beef. It is a traditional Korean food, commonly eaten as snack food, banchan (food accompanying bap) or anju (food accompanying sul). It is also one of the foods prepared for traditional occasions such as pyebaek (formal greetings from the newlyweds after the wedding ceremony) and jesa (ancestral rite).

== Name ==
The Sino-Korean word yukpo (육포, 肉脯) is a compound of yuk (육, 肉), meaning "meat", and po (포, 脯), meaning "dried meat or fish". Because beef is the default meat in Korean cuisine, many beef dishes such as yukpo and bulgogi are referred using the words gogi (고기) or yuk (육, 肉), meaning "meat", rather than soegogi (쇠고기) or uyuk (우육, 牛肉), meaning "cow meat".

== Varieties ==
Dried thinly sliced beef is usually called geonpo (건포, 乾脯), while when the meat is pounded flat and dried it is called pyeonpo (편포, 片脯). When the beef is seasoned with salt and pepper, it is called yeompo (염포, 鹽脯), while the dried beef seasoned or marinated with soy sauce-based seasonings are called jangpo (장포, 醬脯), pyeonpo (편포, 片脯), sanpo (산포, 散脯), or yakpo (약포, 藥脯), according to the methods.

- Baepo (배포, 焙脯) – thinly sliced beef or pork, seasoned and dried on baerong (배롱, 焙籠) on fire
- Jangpo (장포, 醬脯) – thick slices of lean meat is repeatedly grilled to sear skin, beaten with bats, and seasoned with aged soy sauce, until thoroughly cooked
- Jeotguk-po (젓국포) – thinly sliced beef, parboiled in water and jeotguk (liquid from salted seafood) and dried
- Possam (포쌈) – thinly sliced beef, seasoned, beaten, cut into circles, stuffed with a few pine nuts and sealed into half-moon shape, dried and grilled
- Pyeonpo (편포, 片脯) – beef is pounded flat with knife, and dried
  - Daechu-pyeonpo (대추편포) – pounded beef is shaped into a size and shape of a jujube
  - Jang-pyeonpo (장편포, 醬片脯) – beef pounded and marinated with soy sauce
  - Jin-pyeonpo (진편포) – thinly sliced beef, marinated with oil, soy sauce, and salt, and eaten raw or grilled without being dried
- Sanpo (산포, 散脯) – sliced pieces of beef is massaged with salt and sun-dried
- Yakpo (약포, 藥脯) – meat is thinly sliced, seasoned with soy sauce, oil, sugar, and pepper, massaged, and dried on sokuri

== Use ==
Yukpo is eaten as snack food, banchan (food accompanying bap) or anju (food accompanying sul). Salted and dried yukpo is eaten as po-jaban (포자반), a salty banchan. Yukpo is also one of the foods prepared for traditional occasions such as pyebaek (formal greetings from the newlyweds after the wedding ceremony) and jesa (ancestral rite).

== See also ==
- Beef jerky
- Dried meat
- List of beef dishes
