= Kuivaliha =

Salted and dried meat

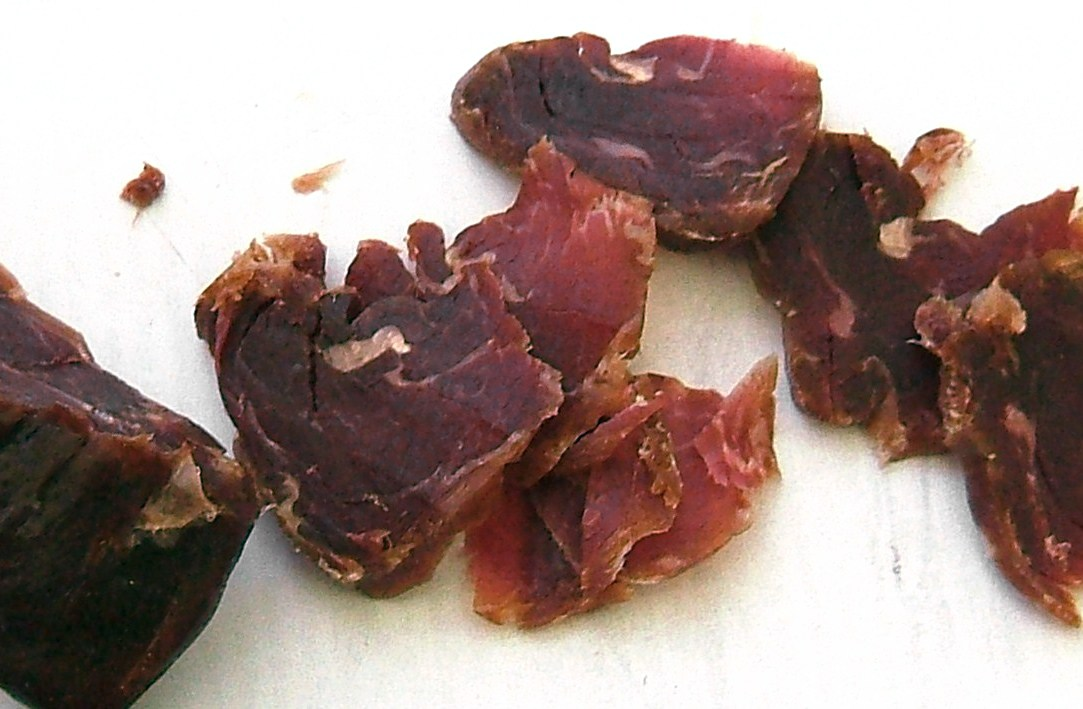
- Dried reindeer meat.
- Alternative names: Kapaliha
- Associated cuisine: Finnish cuisine
- Main ingredients: Dried meat (reindeer)

Kuivaliha (Finnish, lit. 'dry meat'), also known as kapaliha, is Finnish salted and dried meat, often reindeer meat.

It is a traditional food and a delicacy of Northern Finland, prepared at springtime. Like jerky, of which kuivaliha is not a variant of, its origins lie in the need for food preservation. Kuivaliha is a very useful snack when camping, etc., for its light weight and good nutrition values. It is also used in soup (kuivalihakeitto).

== Preparation ==
Kuivaliha is prepared outdoors by hanging salted strips of meat in the open air, facing south (for sunshine). Netting is often used to keep birds and other animals away. The drying process takes approximately three weeks.

Preparation of kuivaliha is done in March and April, based on specific weather conditions in the Finnish springtime: Ambient temperature above freezing during the day, below-freezing temperatures at night (which prevents insects from contaminating the meat along with speeding up the drying process), a dry wind, and sunlight. If the weather is too warm, the meat will rot and if it is too cold, the meat will suffer from freezer burn. Kuivaliha cannot be prepared in the traditional fashion in other seasons.

== See also ==
- Dried meat
- Jerky
- List of dried foods
