= Tolkusha =

Tolkusha is a traditional food of the Chukotko-Kamchatkan peoples in the Russian Far East, especially Kamchatka. It is made of dried fish meat or fish roe mixed with fat (seal or reindeer) and berries (bilberry or crowberry) extended with edible plant bulbs or stems, ground and pounded together for a long time to yield a white paste.

Tolkusha (Russian: толкуша) is a Russian word, coming from the verb толочь [toloch’] = to bruise, to crush, to pound, to tamp. The indigenous names for tolkusha include Chukchi: rilqəril, Kerek: jilq, Koryak: jilqəjil, Alutor: tilqətil, Palana: təlqətəl or Itelmen: silqsilq.

== See also ==
- Pemmican
- Alaskan ice cream

The dictionary definition of tolkusha at Wiktionary
