= Vacuum packing =

Method of removing air from a package prior to sealing

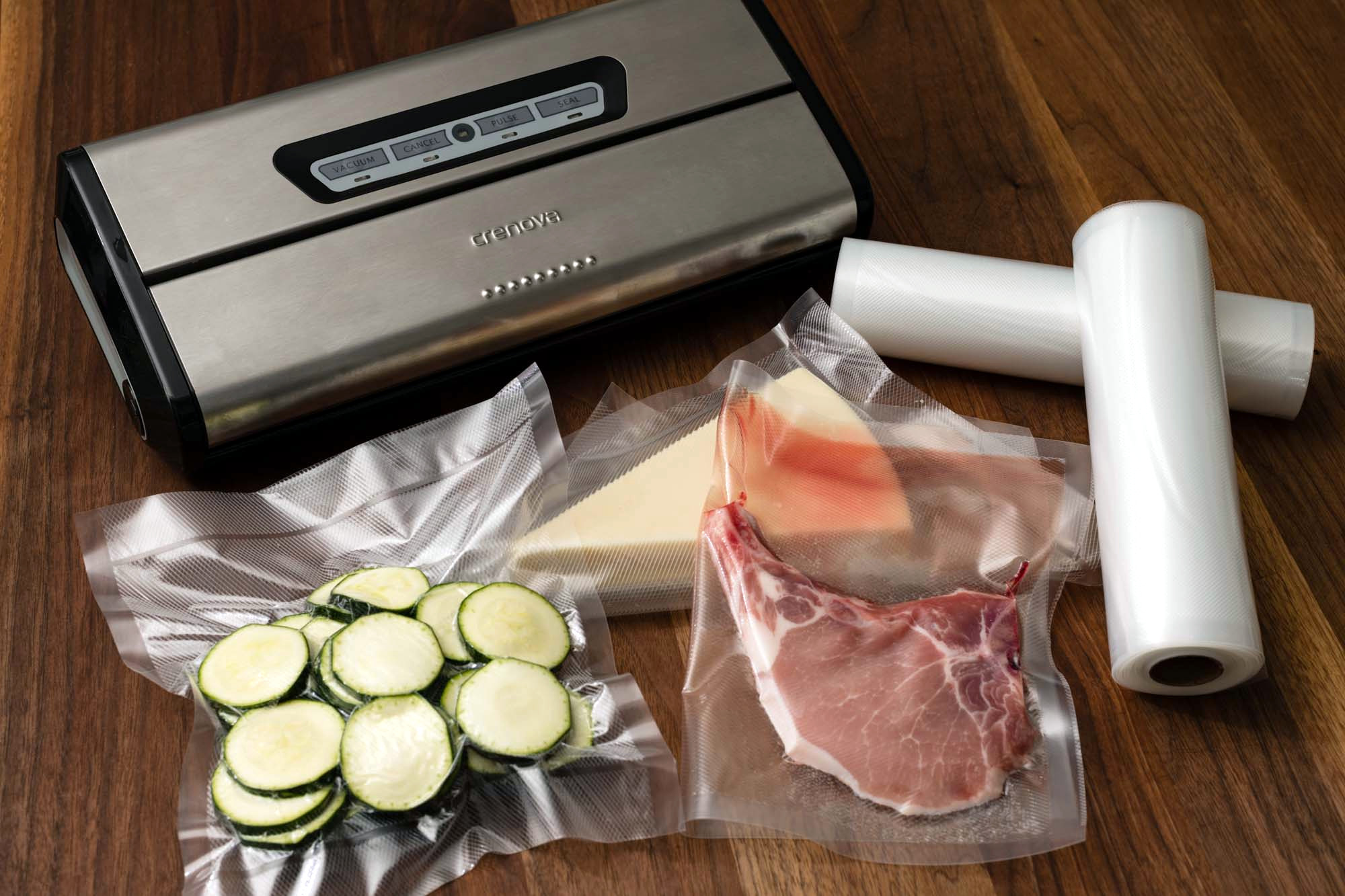
Sealed food alongside a home vacuum sealer and plastic rolls used for sealing

Vacuum packing is a method of packaging that removes air from the package prior to sealing. This method involves placing items in a plastic film package, removing air from inside and sealing the package. Shrink film is sometimes used to have a tight fit to the contents. The intent of vacuum packing is usually to remove oxygen from the container to extend the shelf life of foods and, with flexible package forms, to reduce the volume of the contents and package.

Vacuum packing reduces atmospheric oxygen, limiting the growth of aerobic bacteria or fungi, and preventing the evaporation of volatile components. It is also commonly used to store dry foods over a long period of time, such as cereals, nuts, cured meats, cheese, smoked fish, coffee, and potato chips (crisps). On a more short-term basis, vacuum packing can also be used to store fresh foods, such as vegetables, meats, and liquids, because it inhibits bacterial growth.

Vacuum packing greatly reduces the bulk of non-food items. For example, clothing and bedding can be stored in bags evacuated with a domestic vacuum cleaner or a dedicated vacuum sealer. This technique is sometimes used to compact household waste, for example where a charge is made for each full bag collected.

Vacuum packaging products, using plastic bags, canisters, bottles, or mason jars, are available for home use.

For delicate food items that might be crushed by the vacuum packing process (such as potato chips), an alternative is to replace the interior gas with nitrogen. This has the same effect of inhibiting deterioration due to the removal of oxygen.

== Types ==
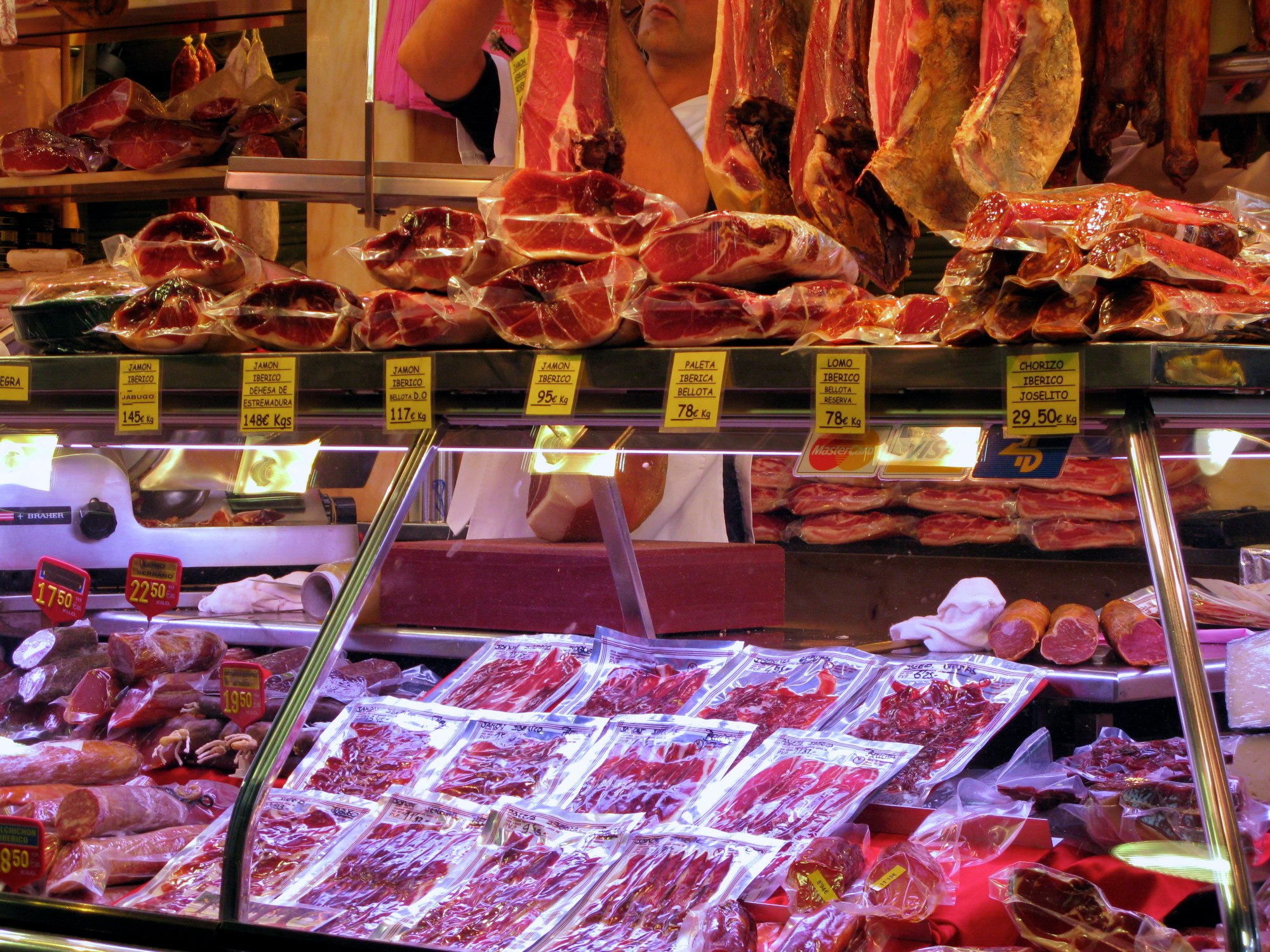
Vacuum packaged ready-to-sell Jamón products

=== Edge, suction, and external vacuum sealers ===
External vacuum sealers involve a bag being attached to the vacuum-sealing machine externally. The machine will remove the air and seal the bag, which is all done outside the machine. A heat sealer is often used to seal the pack. Typically these units use a dry piston vacuum pump which is often considered a "maintenance-free" pump. For sealing dry goods only, this is the preferred method. Moist foods are known to cause internal corrosion on these dry piston pumps.

=== Double-chamber vacuum sealers ===
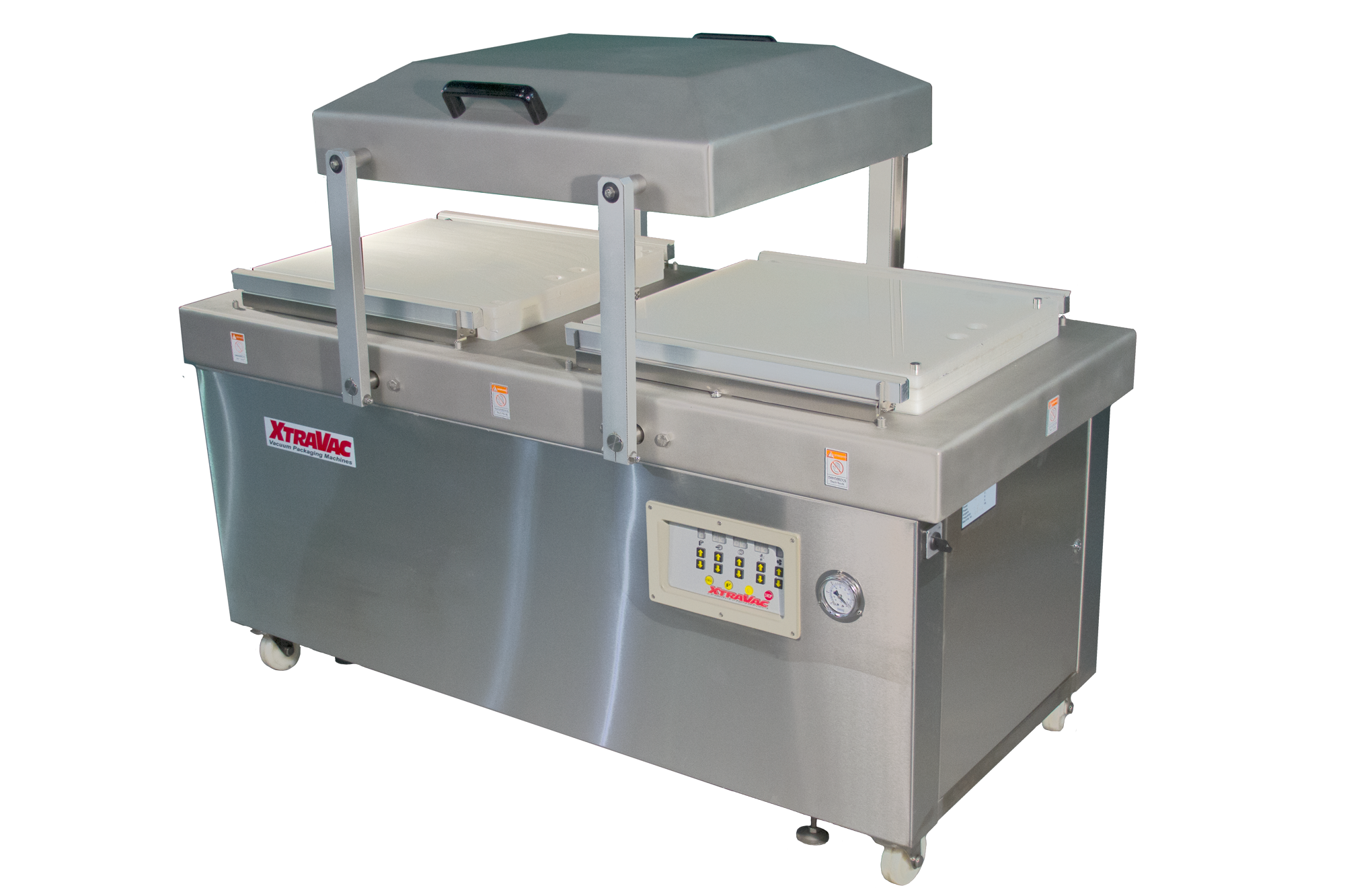
Double-chamber vacuum packaging machine

Double-chamber sealers require the entire product to be placed in a plastic bag within the machine. Once the product is placed in the machine on the seal bar, the lid is closed and air is removed. Then a seal bar inside the chamber seals the product in the bag, after sealing the bag the chamber is refilled with air by the automatic opening of a vent to the outside. This oncoming pressure squeezes all remaining air in the bag. The lid is then opened and the product removed. Double-chamber sealers are typically used for medium-volume packaging, and also have the capability to vacuum seal liquids. The lid generally swings from one side to another, increasing production speed over a single-chamber model. Double-chamber vacuum packaging machines generally have either spring-weighted lids or fully automatic lids.

Double-chamber vacuum packaging machines are commonly used for:

- Fresh meat
- Processed meat
- Cheese (hard and soft)
- Candy and chocolate

=== Rotary belt type vacuum sealers ===
Rotary belt type vacuum packaging machine or vacuum sealer features the same function as the double-chamber vacuum packaging machine as a 'vacuum bag sealer'. But the rotary belt vacuum packaging machine is more convenient, as the belt rotates automatically while the bags are placed to the sealing bar and vacuum sealing process completed. The vacuumed and sealed bags are automatically unloaded, which obviously is more convenient. The packaging plate of the machine is adjustable to 4 degrees, which allows the vacuum packaging of food with soup and liquid.

Rotary belt type packaging machines are commonly used for:

- Fresh meat
- Processed meat
- Seafood
- Pickles
- Cheese (hard and soft)
- Candy and chocolate
- Any other packs that needs vacuum sealing, and the size of the pack is not too big.

=== Automatic belt vacuum chamber machines ===
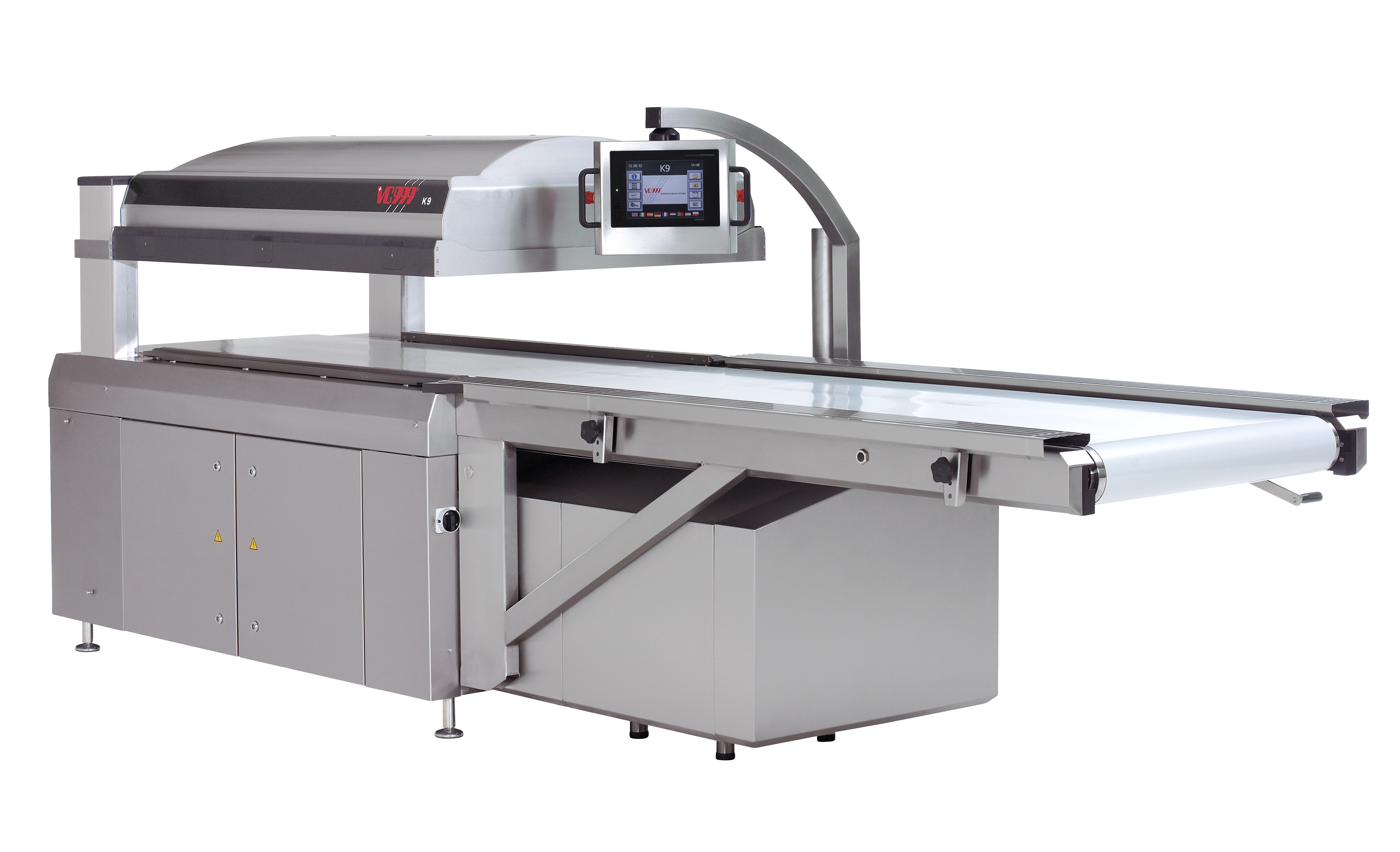
Automatic Belt Vacuum Chamber Machine. Automatic belt vacuum chamber machines offer vastly increased speed and automation and accommodate large products.

Automatic belt chamber sealers require the entire product to be placed in a plastic bag or flow wrapped pouch within the machine. The product travels on the conveyor belt, it is automatically positioned in the machine on the seal bar, the lid is closed and air is removed. Then a seal bar inside the chamber seals the product in the bag. After sealing the bag, the chamber is refilled with air by the automatic opening of a vent to the outside. This oncoming pressure squeezes all remaining air in the bag. The lid is then opened and the product removed. Automatic belt vacuum chamber machines are typically used for high-speed packaging of large items, and also have the capability to vacuum seal liquids. The lid generally travels straight up and down.

Automatic belt vacuum chamber packaging machines are commonly used for:

- Fresh meat (large portions)
- Processed meat
- Large sausage logs
- Cheese (hard and soft)

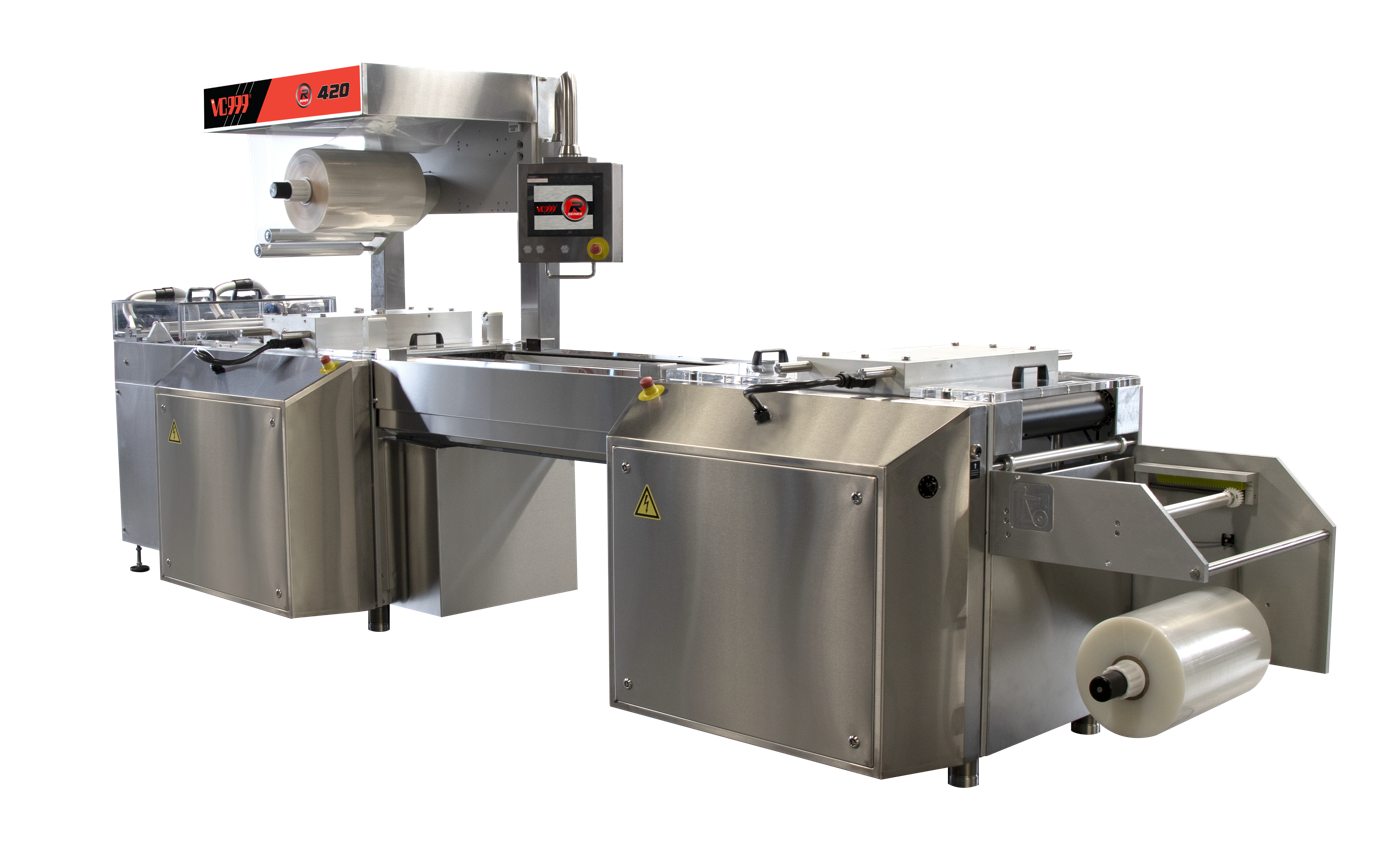
Next-generation machines look similar but are much easier to operate and maintain.

=== Thermoforming HFFS vacuum packaging machines ===
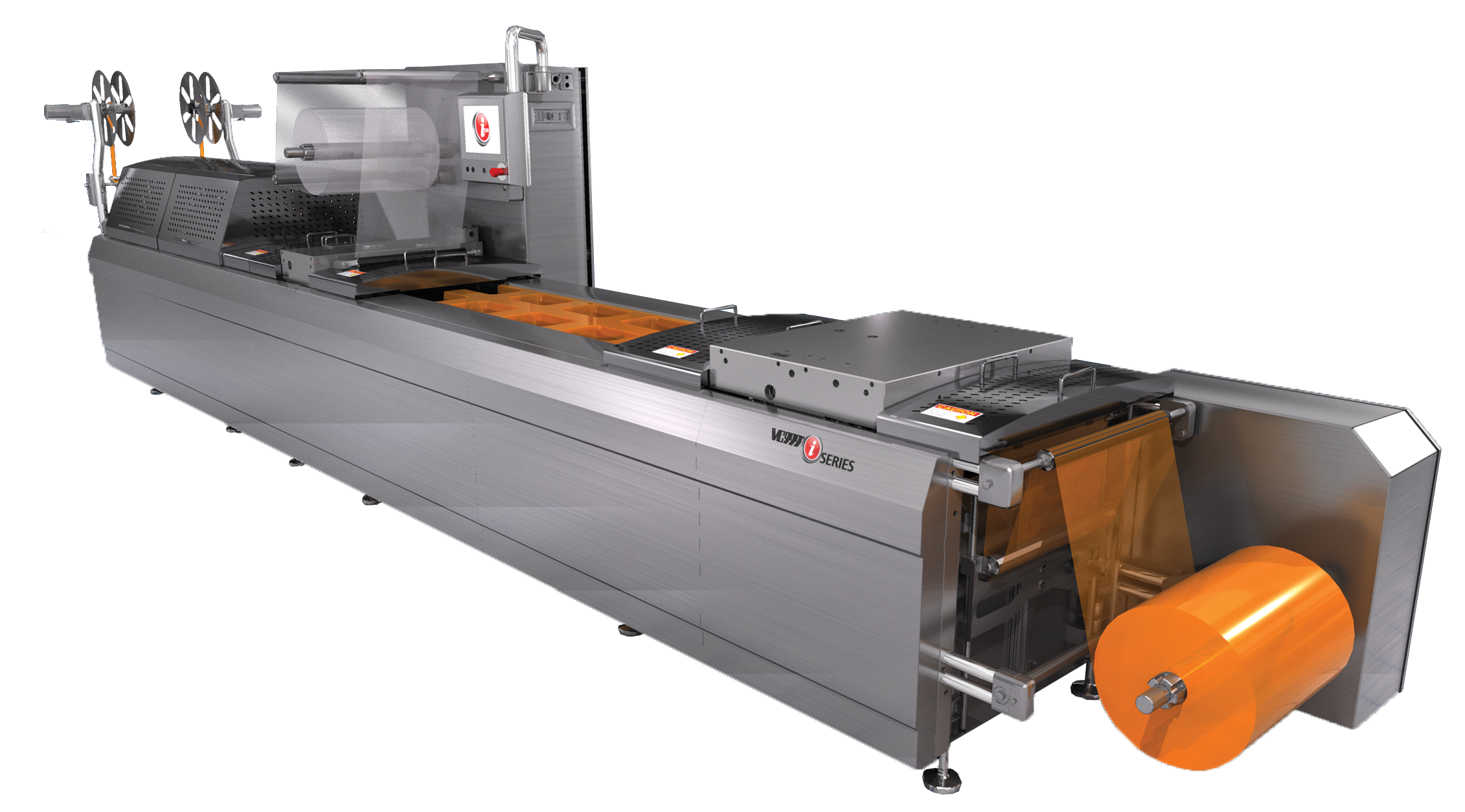
Thermoform packaging machines are used in larger production facilities for vacuum packaging products.

Vacuum packaging in large production facilities can be done with thermoforming machines. These are Form-Fill-Seal style machines that form the package from rolls of packaging film (webbing). Products are loaded into the thermoformed pockets, the top web is laid and sealed under a vacuum, MAP (modified atmosphere), or skin packaging producing rapidly packaged products. Thermoforming can greatly increase packaging production speed. Thermoformed plastics can be customized for size, color, clarity, and shape to fit products perfectly, creating a consistent appearance. One of the most commonly used thermoformed plastics is PET, known for a high-strength barrier resistant to outside tampering and an ease of molding into designated designs and shapes. Some common uses for Thermoforming in vacuum packaging include:

- Fresh and marinated meat
- Sausage
- Cheese
- Candy and chocolate
- Grain
- Grab-and-go snacks (beef jerky, snack sticks)
- Pharmaceutical and medical products
- Coins and collectables

== Food storage ==
=== Food safety ===
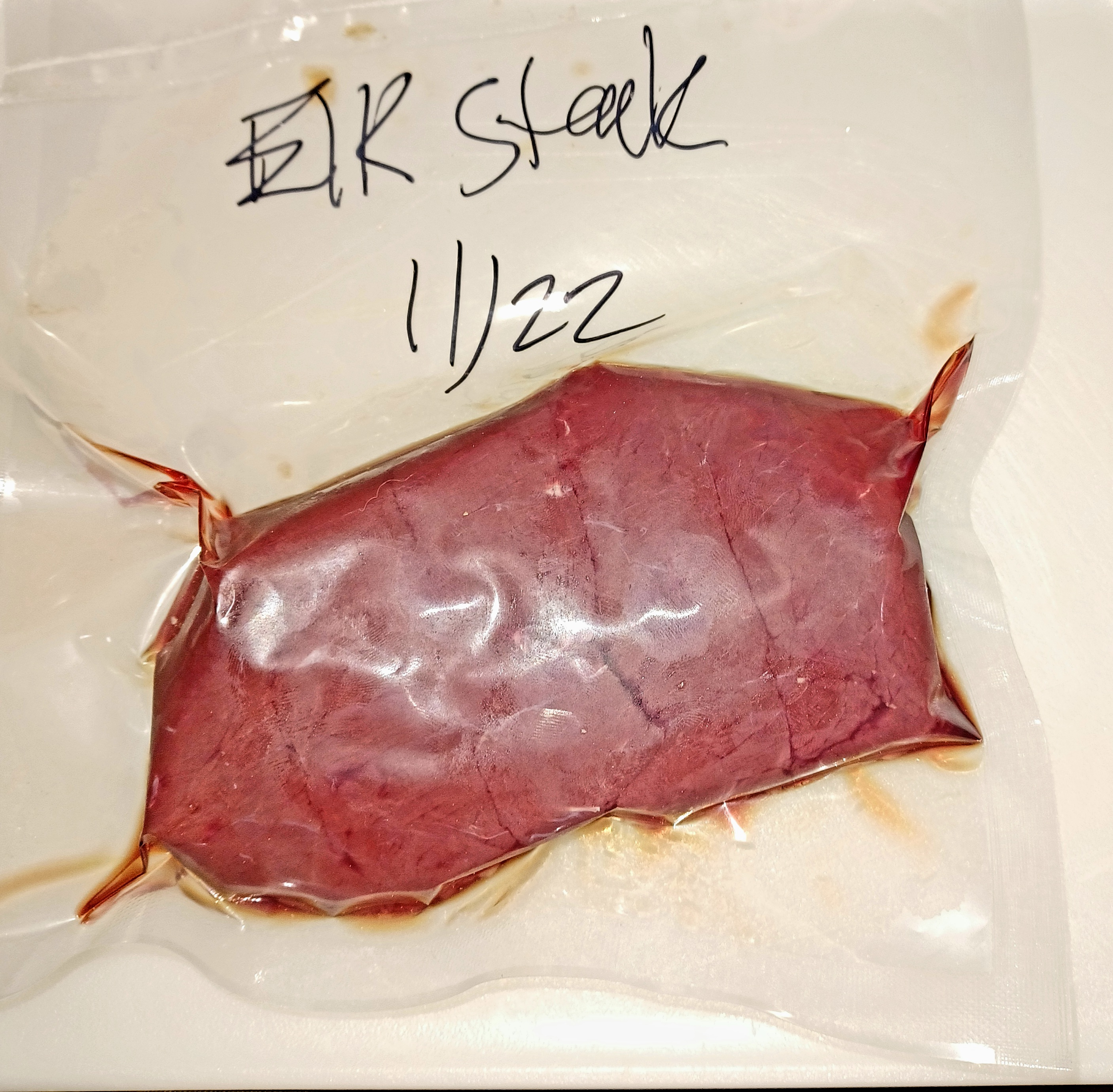
A cut of wild-caught elk meat in a vacuum sealed bag

In an oxygen-depleted environment, anaerobic bacteria can proliferate, potentially causing food-safety issues. Some pathogens of concern in vacuum packed foods are spore-forming non-proteolytic Clostridium botulinum, Yersinia enterocolitica, and Listeria monocytogenes. Vacuum packing is often used in combination with other food processing techniques, such as retorting or refrigeration, to inhibit the growth of anaerobic organisms.

=== Shelf life ===
Depending on the product, atmosphere, temperature, and the barrier properties of the package, vacuum packaging extends the shelf life of many foods. The shelf life of meats can be extended by vacuum packaging, particularly when used with modified atmosphere packaging.

=== High barrier-chamber vacuum shrink bags ===
The amount of shelf life enhanced by a vacuum bag is dependent on the structure in the material. A standard vacuum bag is composed of a PA/PE structure where PA is for puncture resistance and PE is for sealing. The high barrier category includes the usage of more layers focused on the prevention of oxygen permeability, and therefore shelf life protection. There are two materials used in high barrier structures, polyvinylidene chloride (PVDC) and ethylene vinyl alcohol (EVOH). Shelf life indication can be effectively measured by how many cubic centimeters of oxygen can permeate through 1 square meter of material over a 24-hour period. A standard PA/PE bag allows on average 100 cubic centimeters, PVDC allows on average over 10, and EVOH on average 1 cubic centimeter. Multi-layer structures allow the ability to use strong oxygen-barrier materials for enhanced shelf life protection.

=== Freezer burn ===
When foods are frozen without preparation, freezer burn can occur. It happens when the surface of the food is dehydrated, and this leads to a dried and leathery appearance. Freezer burn also changes the flavor and texture of foods. Vacuum packing reduces freezer burn by preventing the food from exposure to cold, dry air.

== See also ==
Sous vide
