= Pemmican =

Food mix with long shelf life, sometimes used as survival food

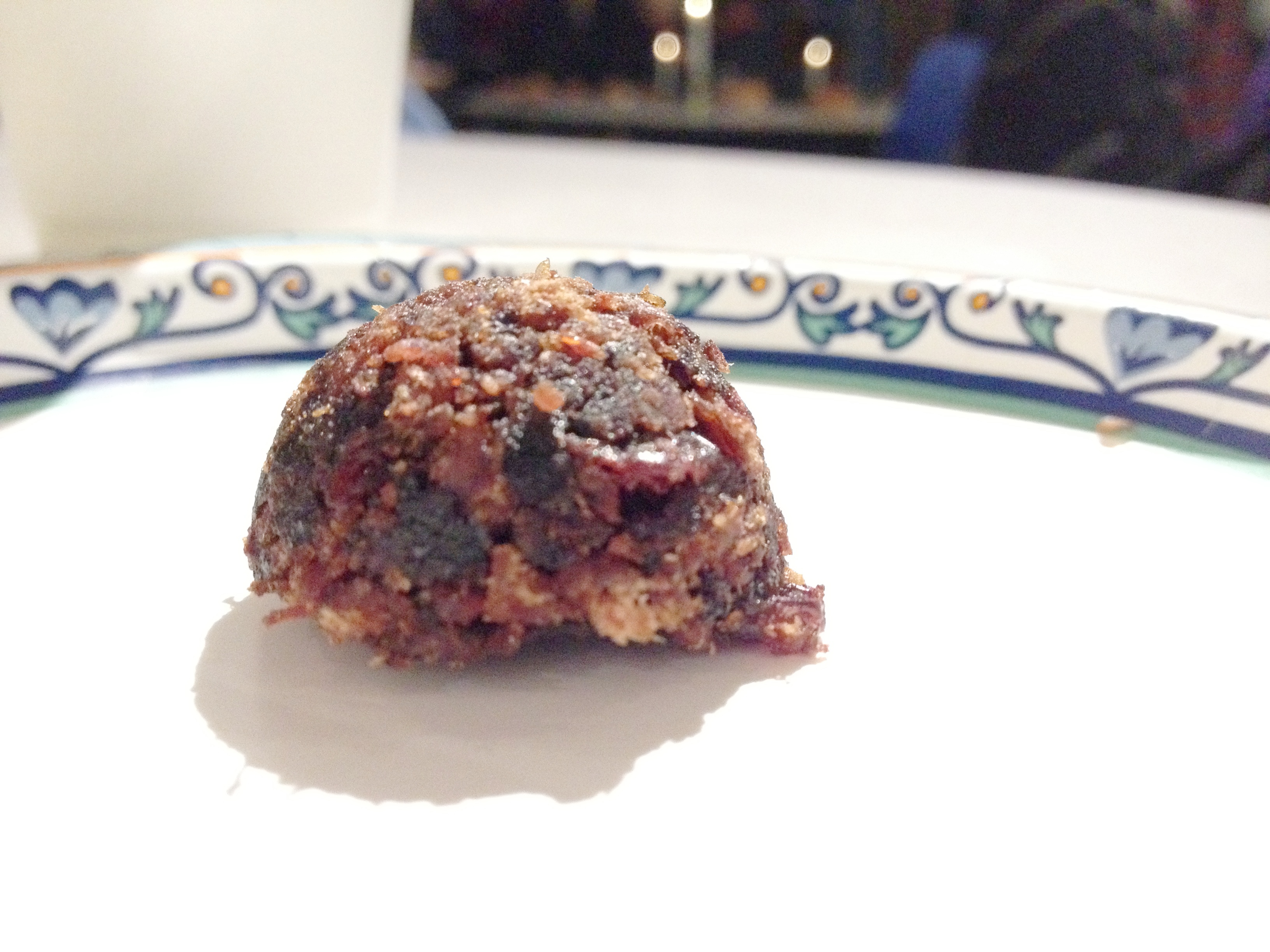
- Pemmican ball
- Type: Agglomeration
- Course: Main course
- Place of origin: North America
- Main ingredients: Meat of bison, deer, elk, moose

Pemmican (/ˈpɛmɪkən/) (also pemican in older sources) is a mixture of tallow, dried meat, and sometimes dried berries. A calorie-rich food, it can be eaten raw or used as a component of prepared foods such as stews. Historically, it was an important part of indigenous cuisine in certain parts of North America and it is still prepared today.

The name comes from the Cree word ᐱᒦᐦᑳᓐ (pimîhkân), which is derived from the word ᐱᒥᕀ (pimî), 'fat, grease'. The Lakota (or Sioux) word is wasná, originally meaning 'grease derived from marrow bones', with the wa- creating a noun, and sná referring to small pieces that adhere to something. It was invented by the Indigenous peoples of North America.

Pemmican was widely adopted as a concentrated high-calorie food by Europeans involved in the fur trade and later by Arctic and Antarctic explorers, such as Captain Robert Bartlett, Ernest Shackleton, Richard E. Byrd, Fridtjof Nansen, Robert Falcon Scott, George W. DeLong, Robert Peary, Matthew Henson, and Roald Amundsen.

== Ingredients ==
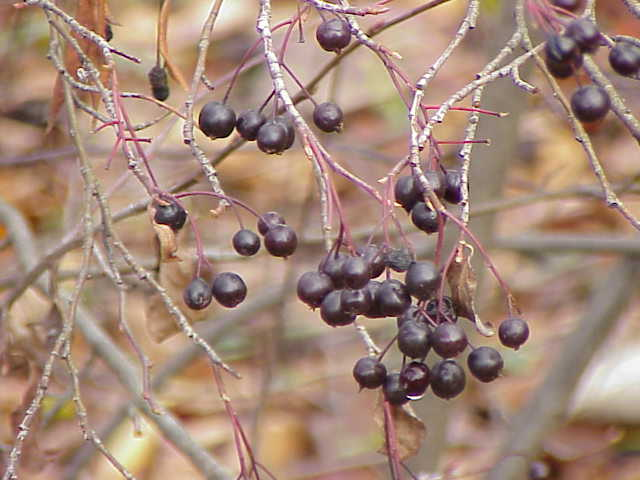
Chokeberries (Aronia prunifolia) sometimes are added to pemmican.

Pemmican has traditionally been made using whatever meat is available: large game meat such as bison, deer, elk, or moose, but also fish such as salmon, and smaller game such as duck; while contemporary pemmican may also include beef. The meat is dried and chopped, before being mixed with rendered animal fat (tallow). Dried fruit may be added: cranberries, saskatoon berries (Cree misâskwatômina), and even blueberries, cherries, chokeberries, and currants—though in some regions these are used almost exclusively for ceremonial and wedding pemmican—and European fur traders also noted the addition of sugar.

Among the Lakota and Dakota nations, there is also a corn wasná (or pemmican) that does not contain dried meat. This is made from toasted cornmeal, animal fat, fruit, and sugar.

== Traditional preparation ==
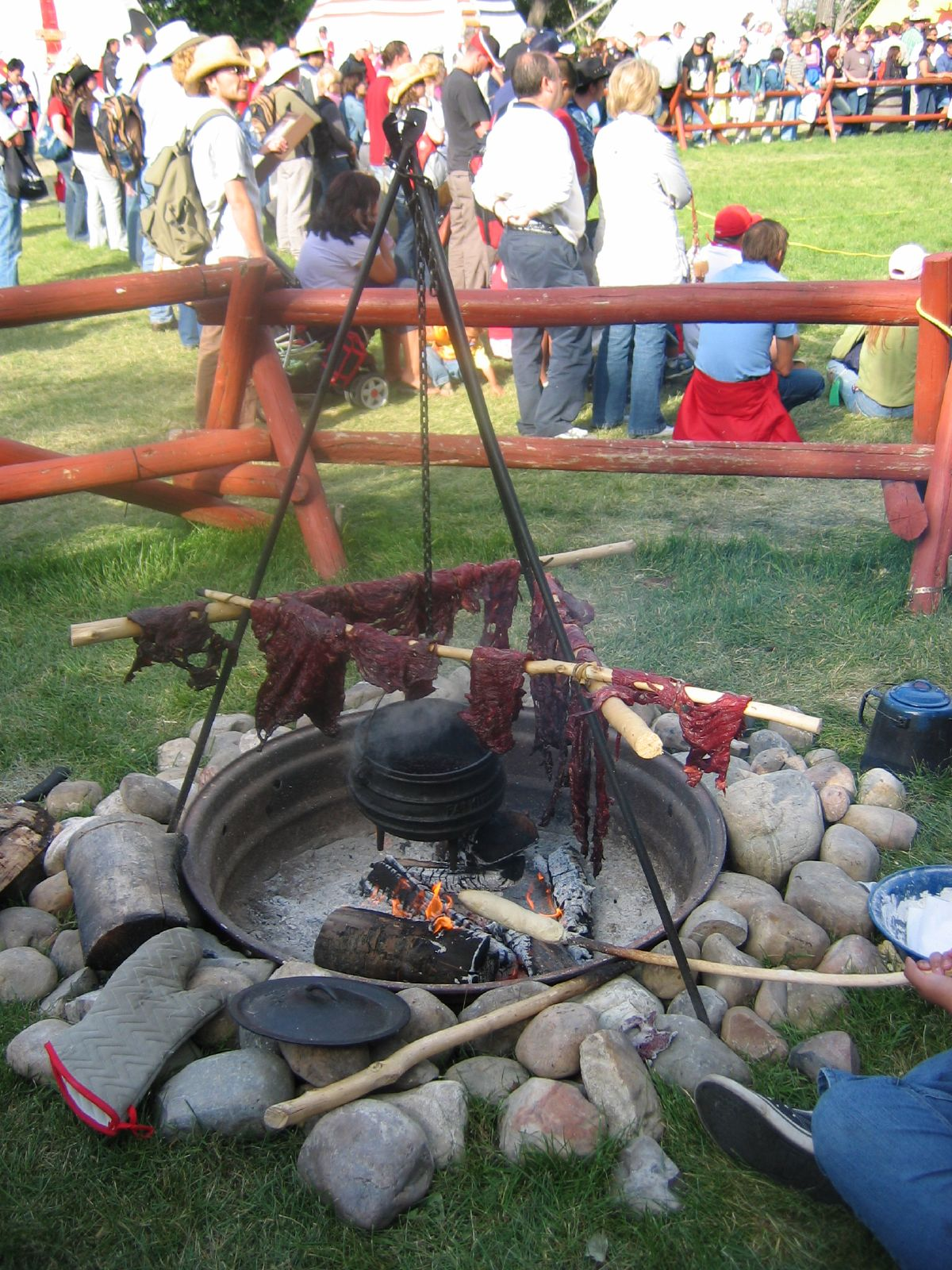
Demonstration at the Calgary Stampede of a traditional method of drying meat for pemmican

Traditionally, the meat was cut in thin slices and dried, either over a slow fire or in the hot sun, until it was hard and brittle. Approximately 5 pounds of fresh meat make 1 pound of dried meat suitable for pemmican. This thin brittle meat is known in Cree as pânsâwân and colloquially in North American English as dry meat. The pânsâwân was then spread across a tanned animal hide pinned to the ground, where it was beaten with flails or ground between two large stones until it turned into very small pieces, almost powder-like in its consistency. The pounded meat was then mixed with melted fat in an approximate 1:1 ratio by weight. Typically, the melted fat would be suet that has been rendered into tallow. In some cases, dried fruits, such as blueberries, chokecherries, cranberries, or saskatoon berries, were pounded into powder and then added to the meat-fat mixture. The resulting mixture was then packed into rawhide bags for storage where it would cool, and then harden into pemmican. Pemmican may be stored in glass jars or tin boxes, with shelf life varying on ingredients and storage conditions.

A bag of bison pemmican weighing approximately 90 lb (41 kg) was called a taureau (French for "bull") by the Métis of Red River. These bags of taureaux (lit. "bulls"), when mixed with fat from the udder, were known as taureaux fins; when mixed with bone marrow, as taureaux grand; and when mixed with berries, as taureaux à grains. It generally took the meat of one bison to fill a taureau.

== Serving ==
In his notes of 1874, North-West Mounted Police Sergeant Major Sam Steele recorded three ways of serving pemmican: raw, boiled in a stew called "rubaboo", or fried, known in the West as a "rechaud": (Note: also spelled richeau, rasho, richot, rouchou, rousseau, rusho(o), rowshow, etc. see, https://web.archive.org/web/20151010145004/https://dchp.ca/DCHP-1/entries/view/richeau)

The pemmican was cooked in two ways in the west; one a stew of pemmican, water, flour and, if they could be secured, wild onions or preserved potatoes. This was called "rubaboo"; the other was called by the plains hunters a "rechaud". It was cooked in a frying pan with onions and potatoes or alone. Some persons ate pemmican raw, but I must say I never had a taste for it that way.

== History ==
As bone grease is an essential ingredient in pemmican, archaeologists consider evidence of its manufacture a strong indicator of pemmican making. There is widespread archaeological evidence (bone fragments and boiling pits) for bone grease production on the Great Plains by AD 1, but it likely developed much earlier. Calcified bone fragments from Paleo-Indian times, however, do not offer clear evidence of pemmican making, due to lack of boiling pits.

It has also been suggested that pemmican may have come through the Bering Strait 4–6 millennia ago.

The first written account of the precursor to what is now considered pemmican is Francisco Vázquez de Coronado's 1541 account of the Querecho Indians and Teya people who traversed the region of Texas now known as "the Texas Panhandle", who were known to sun-dry and mince bison meat, add bison fat, and make a stew of it.

The first written English usage of "pemmican" is attributed to James Isham, who in 1743 wrote that "pimmegan" was a mixture of finely pounded dried meat, fat and cranberries.

The voyageurs of the North American fur trade had no time to live off the land during the short season when the lakes and rivers were free of ice. They had to carry all of their food with them if the distance traveled was too great to be resupplied along the way. A north canoe (canot du nord) with six men and 25 standard 90-pound (41 kg) packs required about four packs of food per 500 miles (800 km). Montreal-based canoemen could be supplied by sea or with locally grown food. Their main food was dried peas or beans, hardtack (sea biscuit), and salt pork. (Western canoemen called their Montreal-based fellows mangeurs de lard or "pork-eaters".) In the Great Lakes, some maize and wild rice could be obtained locally. By the time trade reached the Lake Winnipeg area, the pemmican trade was developed.

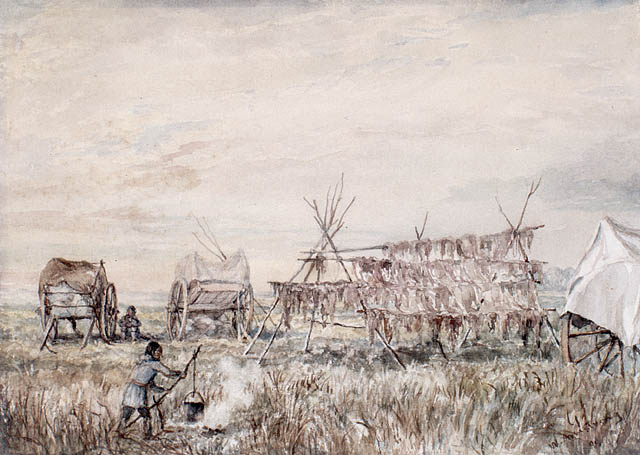
Bison meat drying at a Métis settlement in St. François Xavier, Manitoba, Canada (1899), Library and Archives Canada, Acc. No. 1989-492-2

Trading people of mixed ancestry who would become known as the Métis people would go southwest onto the prairie in Red River carts, slaughter bison, convert it into pemmican, and carry it north to trade from settlements they would make adjacent to North West Company posts. For these people on the edge of the prairie, the pemmican trade was as important a source of trade goods as was the beaver trade for the Indigenous peoples farther north. This trade was a major factor in the emergence of the new and distinct Métis society. Packs of pemmican would be shipped north and stored at the major fur posts: Fort Alexander, Cumberland House, Île-à-la-Crosse, Fort Garry, Norway House, and Edmonton House.

So important was pemmican that, in 1814, governor Miles Macdonell started the Pemmican War with the Métis when he passed the short-lived Pemmican Proclamation, which forbade the export of pemmican from the Red River Colony.

Explorer Alexander Mackenzie relied on pemmican during his 1793 expedition from the Canadas to the Pacific.

North Pole explorer Robert Peary used pemmican on all three of his expeditions, from 1886 to 1909, for both his men and his dogs. In his 1917 book, Secrets of Polar Travel, he devoted several pages to the food, stating, "Too much cannot be said of the importance of pemmican to a polar expedition. It is an absolute sine qua non. Without it a sledge-party cannot compact its supplies within a limit of weight to make a serious polar journey successful."

British polar expeditions fed a type of pemmican to their dogs known as "sledging rations". Called "Bovril pemmican" or simply "dog pemmican", it was a beef product consisting, by volume, of 2/3 protein and 1/3 fat (i.e., a 2:1 ratio of protein to fat), without carbohydrate. It was later ascertained that although the dogs survived on it, this was not a nutritious and healthy diet for them, being too high in protein. Members of Ernest Shackleton's 1914–1916 expedition to the Antarctic resorted to eating this sort of pemmican when they were stranded on ice during the Antarctic summer.

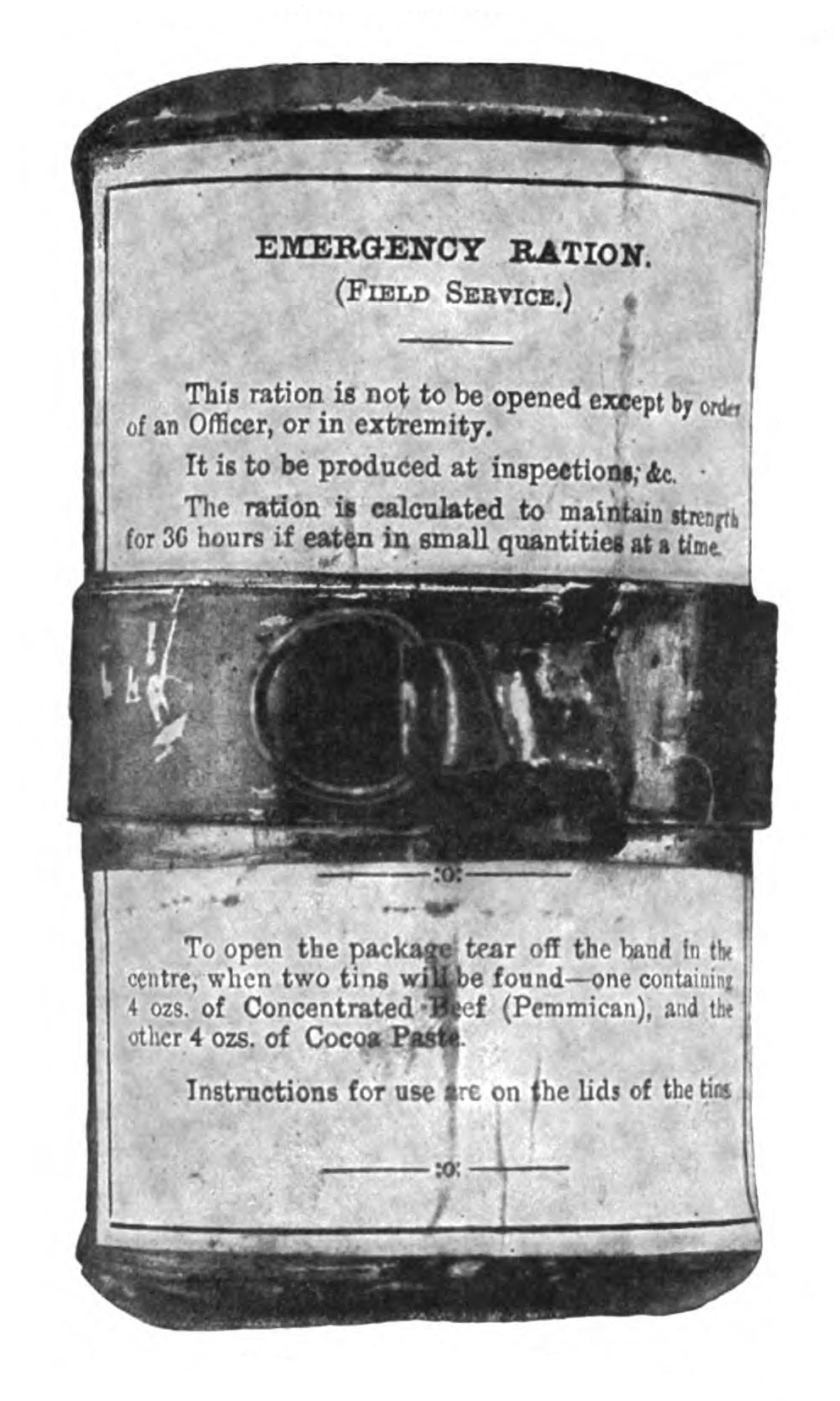
Emergency ration, c. 1899, as carried by British soldiers in the Second Boer War, consisting of 4 ounces (110 g) of pemmican and 4 ounces of cocoa paste

During the Second Boer War (1899–1902), British troops were given an iron ration made of 4 ounces (110 g) of pemmican and 4 ounces of chocolate and sugar. The pemmican would keep in perfect condition for decades. It was considered much superior to biltong, a form of cured game meats commonly used in Africa. This iron ration was prepared in two small tins (soldered together) that were fastened inside the belts of the soldiers. It was the last ration used and it was used only as a last resort—when ordered by the commanding officer. A man could march on this for 36 hours before he began to drop from hunger.

While serving as chief of scouts for the British Army in South Africa, American adventurer Frederick Russell Burnham required pemmican to be carried by every scout.

Pemmican, likely condensed meat bars, was used as a ration for French troops fighting in Morocco in the 1920s. Pemmican was also taken as an emergency ration by Amelia Earhart in her 1928 transatlantic flight.

A 1945 scientific study of emergency rations criticized the sole use of pemmican as a survival food, due to its low levels of certain vitamins.

A study was later done by the U.S. military in January 1969, entitled Arctic Survival Rations, III. The Evaluation of Pemmican Under Winter Field Conditions. The study found that during a cycle of two starvation periods the subjects could stave off starvation for the first cycle of testing with only 1000 calories worth of pemmican.

== Contemporary uses ==
Today, people in many indigenous communities across North America continue to make pemmican for personal, communal, and ceremonial consumption. Some contemporary pemmican recipes incorporate ingredients that have been introduced to the Americas in the past 500 years, including beef. There are also indigenous-owned companies that produce pemmican or foods based on traditional pemmican recipes for commercial distribution.

== See also ==
- Alaskan ice cream – Alaska Native dessert
- Biltong – Southern African air-dried cured meat
- Food drying – Method of food preservation
- Forcemeat – Uniform mixture of lean meat with fat made by grinding the ingredients
- Jerky – Dried lean meat strips
- Mincemeat – Mixture of dried fruit, spices and fat
- Montreal-style smoked meat – Smoked style of corned beef created by Jewish immigrants in Montreal, Quebec
- Nutraloaf – Food served in prisons for additional nutrients
- Pastirma – Spiced dried beef
- Smoked fish – Fish that has been cured by smoking
- Smoked meat – Type of prepared meat
- Tolkusha

Media related to Pemmican at Wikimedia Commons The dictionary definition of pemmican at Wiktionary
