= Pânsâwân =

Dried smoked meat

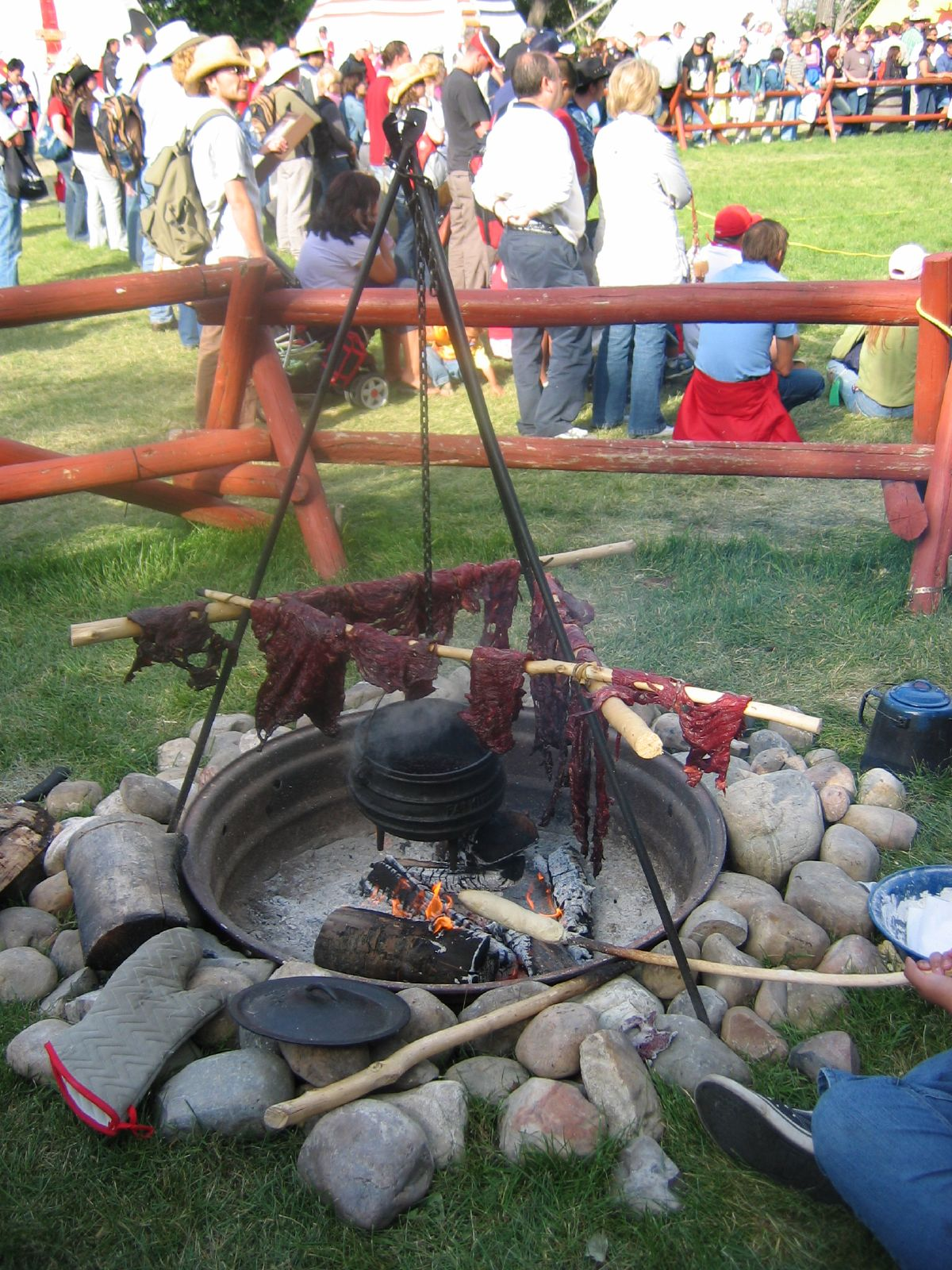
Traditional method of drying and smoking pânsâwân over an open fire at the Calgary Stampede to demonstrate its use in making pemmican.

Pânsâwân, or dry meat, is a type of dried smoked meat product made by the Indigenous peoples of Canada including the Cree, Dene, and Métis. The term is loosely translated from the Cree language as "thin-sliced meat" with the meat used for its production from bison, elk, or moose. It is commonly made in the Indigenous community, considered a delicacy, and is also culturally significant.

Due to the popularity of the product and interest in Indigenous foods, the product is sold globally and many Canadian grocery chains have begun to sell the product domestically.

== Production ==
Pânsâwân is traditionally produced by first slicing the meat parallel to the muscle grain into thin sheets. This can be done either in by slicing meat into separate layers that results in many smaller sheets, or by meticulously slicing a large piece of meat from a single muscle in a rolling fashion that produces a single long extended "scroll". The sheets of sliced meat are then placed on a wooden frame to simultaneously dry and smoke over a small controlled flame. This is sometimes done inside a covered smoke shack. Many North American jerky foods had derived their production from this or similar Indigenous methods.

The product is shelf-stable, can kept for long periods without spoilage despite the lack of added modern preservatives, and can be consumed directly similarly to beef jerky or pounded to make pemmican.

== See also ==
- Pemmican
- Jerky
