= Sukuti =

Dried meat product from the Himalayas

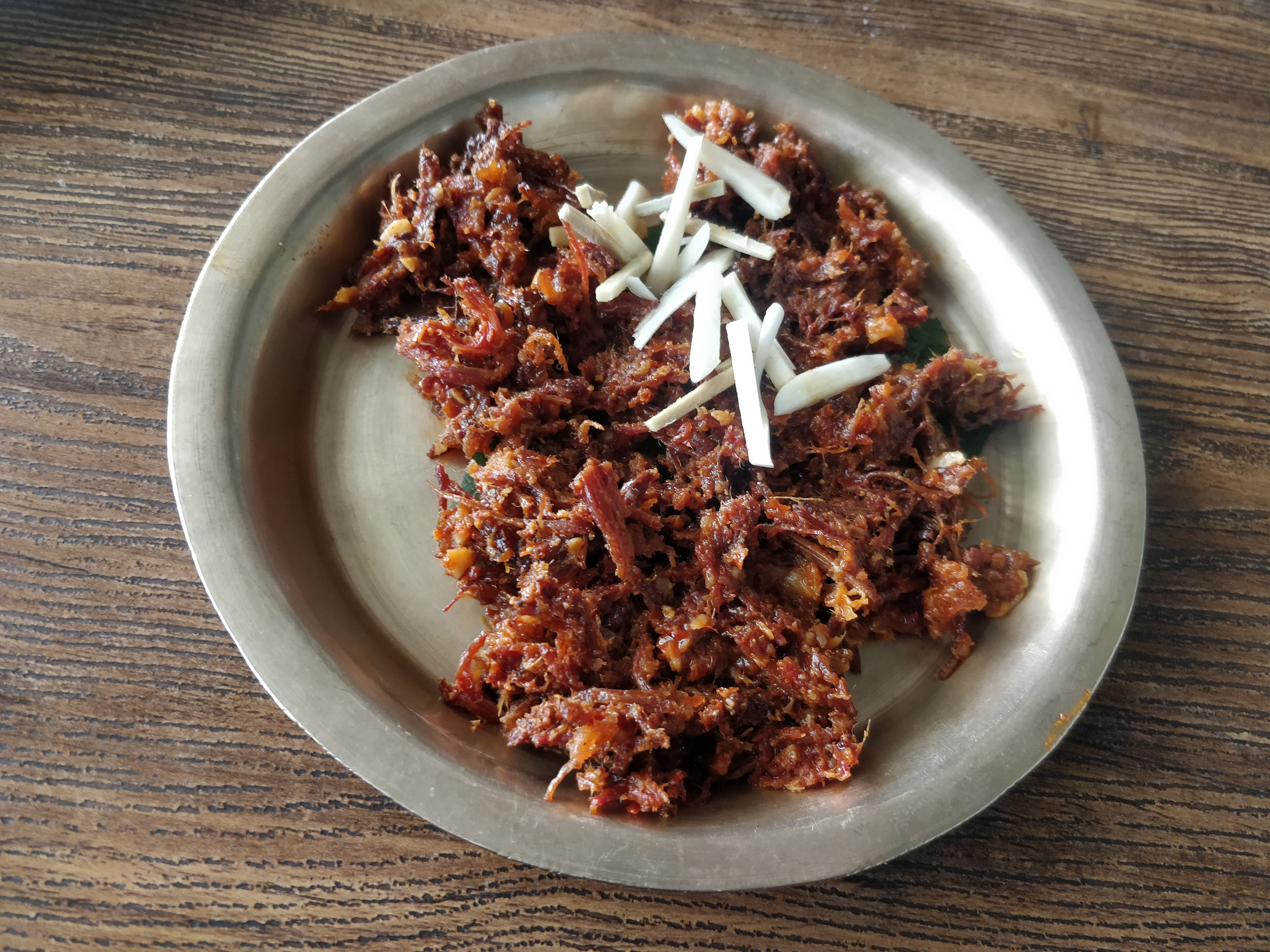
- Alternative names: Dried meat
- Course: Snacks
- Place of origin: Nepal
- Main ingredients: Buffalo, lamb and goat

Sukuti (Nepali: सुकुटी) is a dried meat product of Nepalese origin, also consumed in the Himalayan regions of India and Tibet. It is most commonly made from buffalo, but can also be made of lamb, or goat. It is a staple dish of the Limbu people, and is known as Sakhekya in the Limbu language. Historically, Sukuti served as a non-perishable protein and a way to preserve meat after sacrificing an animal. Today the food is widely available, and is consumed and sold year-round. Sukuti is generally fried and served with raw vegetables or simmered in a curry as a main dish.

== History ==
During ritual animal sacrifice at Hindu temples, in the presence of his kin, the priest offers a buffalo before the shrine of the gods. The sacrificial buffalo is smeared with vermillion powder (abir) The blood sacrifice is given to the gods, and the head is raised in the sanctuary. The village will then process the buffalo, and as meat is a luxury in remote regions, no part of the animal will go to waste. Some meat is sent to be cooked for dinner that day, and the rest will be dried and processed later into dried strips. In Nepal, people did not always indulge in the meat before a well-off urban life with restaurants and stores. In the difficult winters, this lean dried meat came to the rescue during the supply of food.

== Preparation ==
To produce sukuti, the meat of any animal or bird is cut into thin strips and the fat is carefully removed. The meat strips hang on the roof above a Chulho (wood fire smoke) to remove any moisture and to give it its distinct smokey flavor. The drying may also create an unpleasant smell, so the strips are often coated with spices such as salt, cumin, pepper, chilli powder and turmeric, sometimes ginger and garlic paste are also used before they are spread on a clean cloth to dry in the sun. This helps the meat to have an intense flavour and kept the insects at bay. Once all of the moisture is removed, and the meat is sufficiently dried, it is considered a finished product. It can also be rehydrated when it is cooked in gravy, however, it is usually consumed dry, or fried in oil.

== Making and serving ==
Sukuti can be served as a side dish, snack, or in a curry as main course. The main methods to prepare sukuti among the people of Nepal are deep frying or grilled roasting. To make sukuti, a combination of salt, pepper, cumin, turmeric, and chilli powder are browned on roast, then pounded into a blend. The sukuti is then mixed with these spices and fried in oil. Sukuti is versatile, often served with chopped onions and tomatoes, topped with green onions or leaves of coriander. paste. The resulting snack is served as a side dish, an appetizer, or as a side to have whilst drinking alcohol.

== See also ==
- List of dried foods
