= Borts =

Mongolian air-dried meat

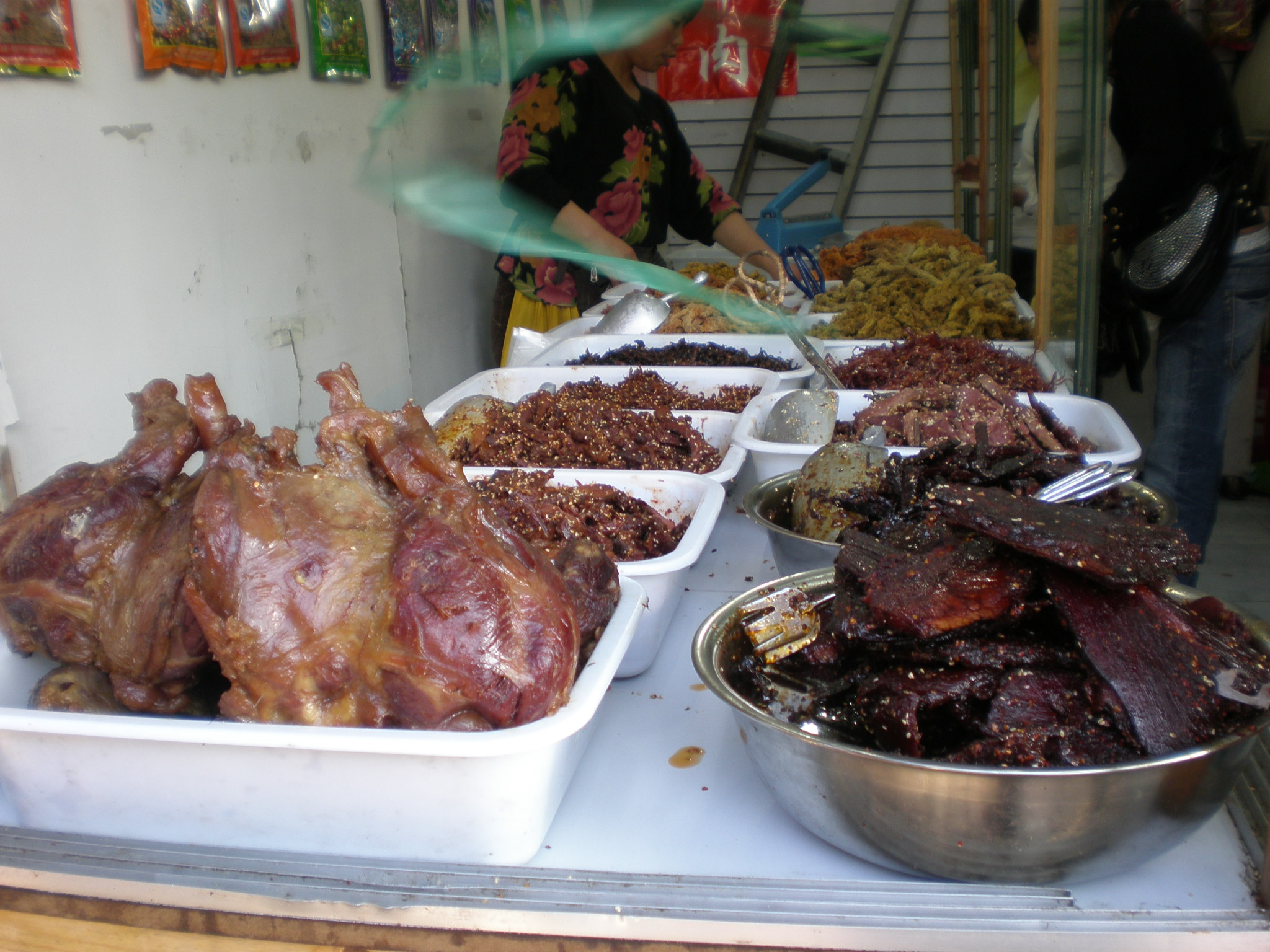
Borts in Lijiang, China

Borts (Mongolian: Борц) is air-dried meat cut into long strips which are hung in the shade. The Mongolian nomadic lifestyle and the local climatic conditions gave rise to specific methods of preserving meat. The most widespread one is air-drying or 'bortsloh'.

== Preparation ==
The fresh meat is cut into long strips, 2-3 cm thick and 5-7 cm wide. The strips are hung on strings under the roof of a ger (yurt), where the air is free to circulate. After about a month the meat has dried and shrunk into small hard, brown wood-like sticks. The dried borts is broken into small pieces or ground to a coarse, fibrous powder. It is stored in a linen bag, which allows contact with air. In the dry climate of Mongolia this method of storage preserves the quality of the meat over months, or even years. Nowadays, borts is also industrially manufactured, and can be bought by the kilogram in paper bags, which is convenient for city dwellers who do not have a ger to dry their meat in. However, traditionalists maintain that industrial borts tastes inferior to the homemade variety.

Borts is more nutritious, and said to be tastier, than other modern field rations. There is an unconfirmed method from old times: Mongolian nobles relied on borts for months-long journeys.

Dried carefully for three years and then ground into a fine powder, until it all could fit through a sieve, borts shrinks further until the meat of a whole cow can fit into a cow's bladder. Just a pinch of borts prepared this way and made into soup is said to able to nourish 3 to 4 people.

== See also ==
- List of dried foods
- Dried meat
