= Dried meat =

Meat that has been dehydrated

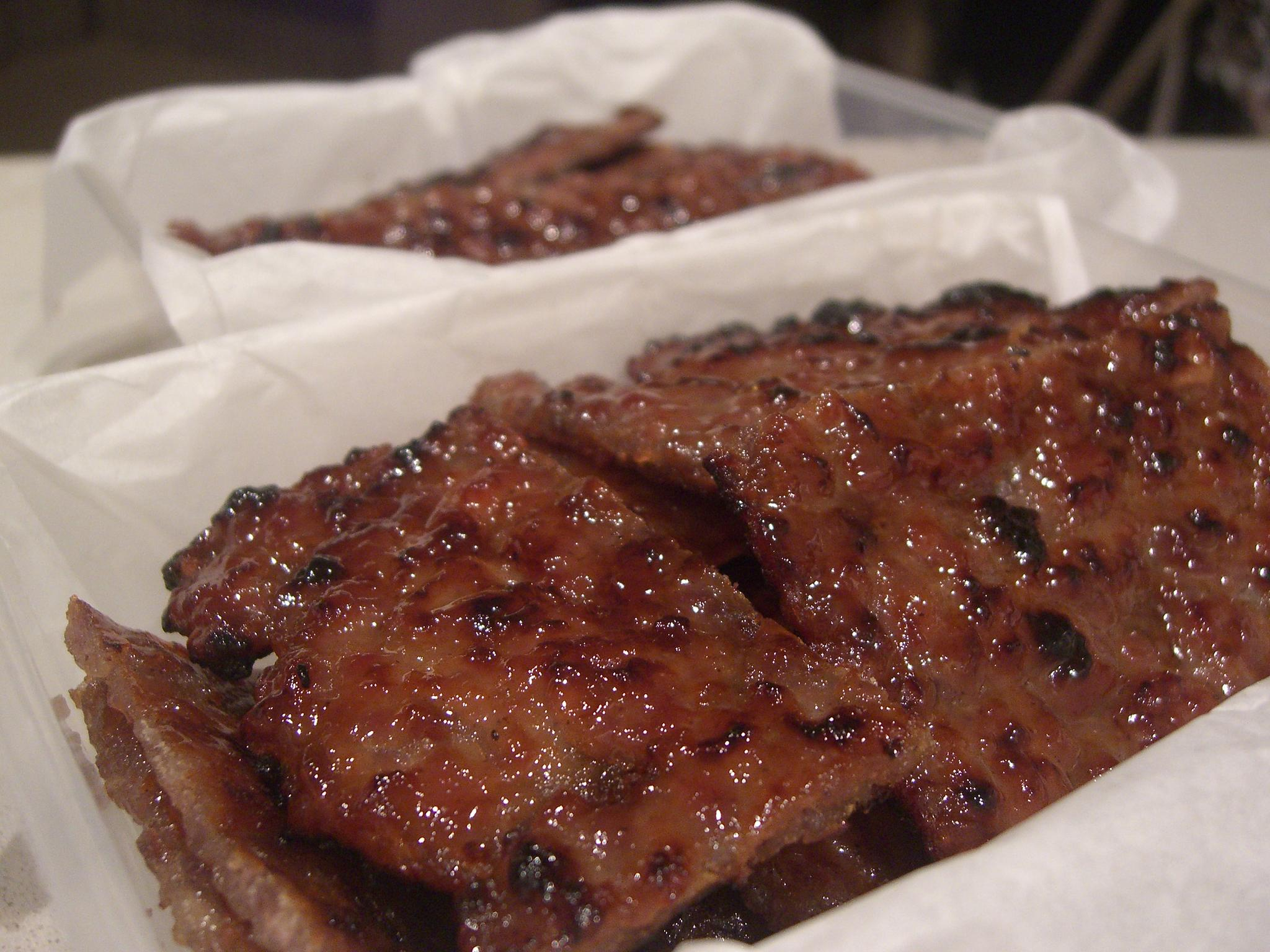
Chinese bakkwa

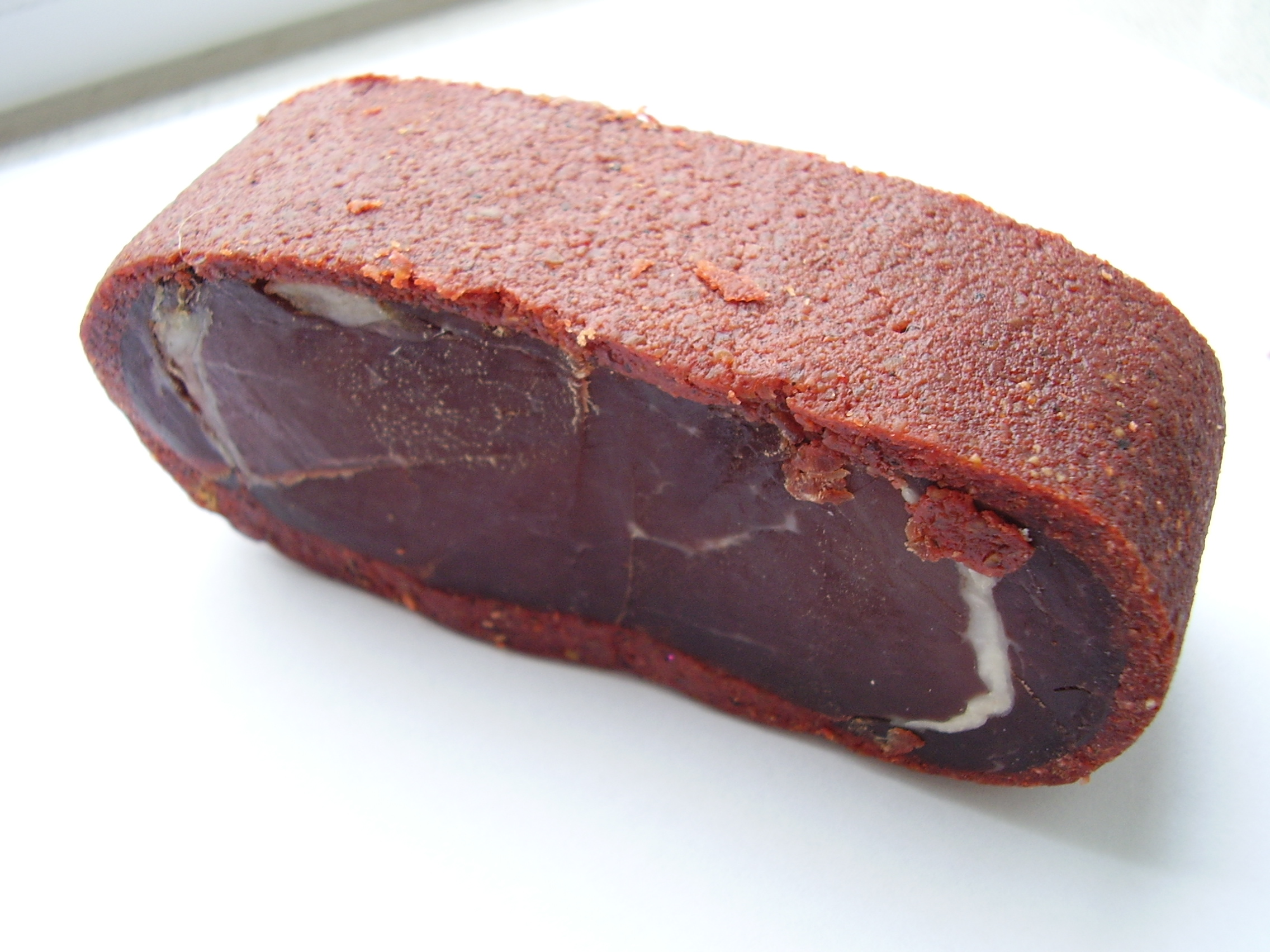
Turkish pastirma

Dried meat is a feature of many cuisines around the world. Examples include:

- Kulen Slanina Pečenica .
- Aliya, sun-dried meat from Kenya.
- Bakkwa or rougan, Chinese salty-sweet dried meat sheets.

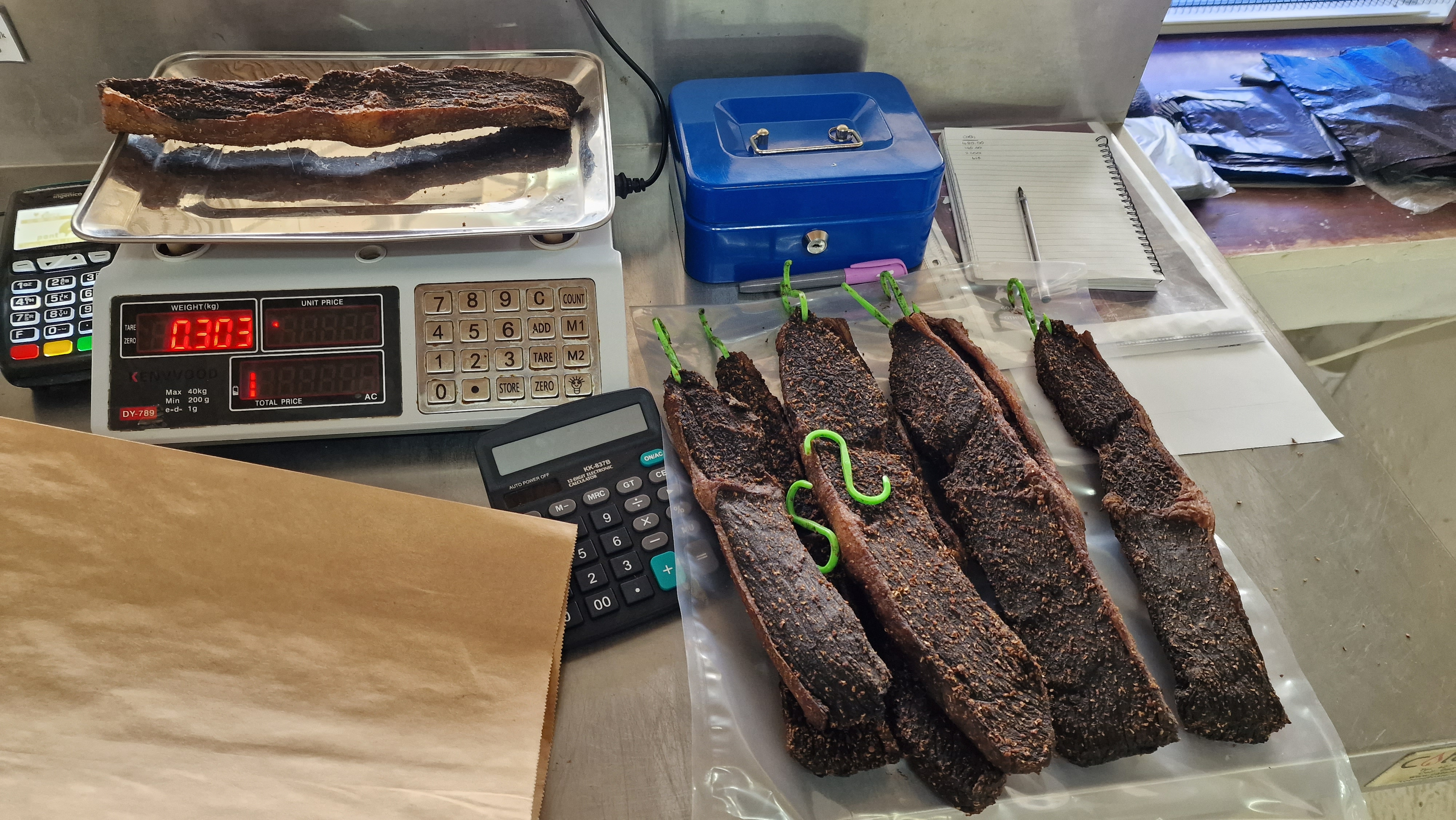
Biltong being weighed for sale in a shop

- Biltong, a cured meat that originated in Southern Africa.
- Bògoǫ, a dried and smoked meat, often caribou, of the Dené people of northern Canada.
- Borts, air-dried strips of horse or cow meat used as traveling food or to last the winter in Mongolia. Often ground into powder and mixed with water to create soup.
- Bresaola, air-dried salted beef originally from the Valtellina valley in northern Italy.
- Brési, made in the canton of Jura and in Jura Bernois in Switzerland and in the department of Doubs in France.
- Bündnerfleisch, air-dried meat from Kanton Graubünden in Switzerland.
- Carne-de-sol, sun-dried salt beef from Brazil.
- Carne seca, air-dried meat from Mexico.
- Cecina, lightly smoked, dried, and salted meat from northwestern Spain (Asturias, León, Cantabria), Cuba, Nicaragua and Mexico.
- Charqui, made from llama or alpaca, in South America.
- Chipped beef, partially dried beef sold in small, thin, flexible leaves in jars or plastic packets.
- Droëwors, from South Africa, dried sausage
- Fenalår from Norway is the salted, dried thigh of a sheep predominantly, but it can also come from other animals such as roe deer, deer, moose or reindeer.
- Hunter beef, a corned beef from Pakistan marinated and baked for use in sandwiches and salads.
- Idiyirachi is a traditional Kerala-style delicacy made of pounded and shredded buffalo dry meat.
- Jerky, meat that has been trimmed of fat, cut into strips, marinated, and dried or smoked.
- Kawaab, air-dried, spiced meat of the Hyderabadi community of India.
- Kilishi, a dried, spicy Nigerian meat. Coated with a peanut sauce as well as other spices.
- Kuivaliha, air-dried salted meat (often reindeer) of northern Finland.
- Laap mei, also called "wax meats" or air-dried meats, are a southern Chinese speciality.
- Lahndi or qadid, air-dried salted meat (often lamb) of Pushtoon Tribe of Pakistan, Northern Afghanistan and Northern Africa (geddid/qeddid).
- Meat floss.
- Mipku, air-dried strips of meat, often caribou or reindeer, of the Inuvialuit people of Northern Canada.
- Pânsâwân, smoked dried strips of bison meat traditionally of the plains Cree peoples of Western Canada and the United States.
- Pastirma, air-dried salted and often spiced meat of in Armenia, Greece, Turkey, and the Balkans.
- Pemmican, a meat mixture, sometimes with dried fruit, used by the native peoples of North America.
- Pindang, dried buffalo meat from the Philippines.
- Po, dried meat in Korean cuisine.
  - Yukpo, dried beef in Korean cuisine.
- Rauchfleisch, salted and cold smoked meat used in regional German, Austrian, and Bavarian cuisine.
- Rukuri, dried meat coated with honey from the central region of Kenya.
- Sukhad, dried game meat from Bhopal, India.
- Suho meso, a smoked beef eaten in Bosnia.
- Sukuti, air-dried, spiced meat of the Newari community of Nepal.
- Uppukandam, dried boneless salted mutton from Tamil Nadu in India.
- Vatti Mamsam or Endu Mamsam is fresh meat of goat, sheep, beef dried in sun mixed with turmeric and salt from Rayalaseema, Andhra Pradesh in India.
- Walliser Rohschinken, air-dried ham from Kanton Wallis in Switzerland.
- Walliser Trockenfleisch, air-dried beef from Kanton Wallis in Switzerland.
- Walliser Trockenspeck, air-dried bacon from Kanton Wallis in Switzerland.
- Walliser Trockenwurst, air-dried sausage from Kanton Wallis in Switzerland.
- Gakhaj, sun or oven-dried meat from Gakh region in Azerbaijan.

== See also ==
- List of dried foods
- List of smoked foods
