= Freezer burn =

Damage in frozen food

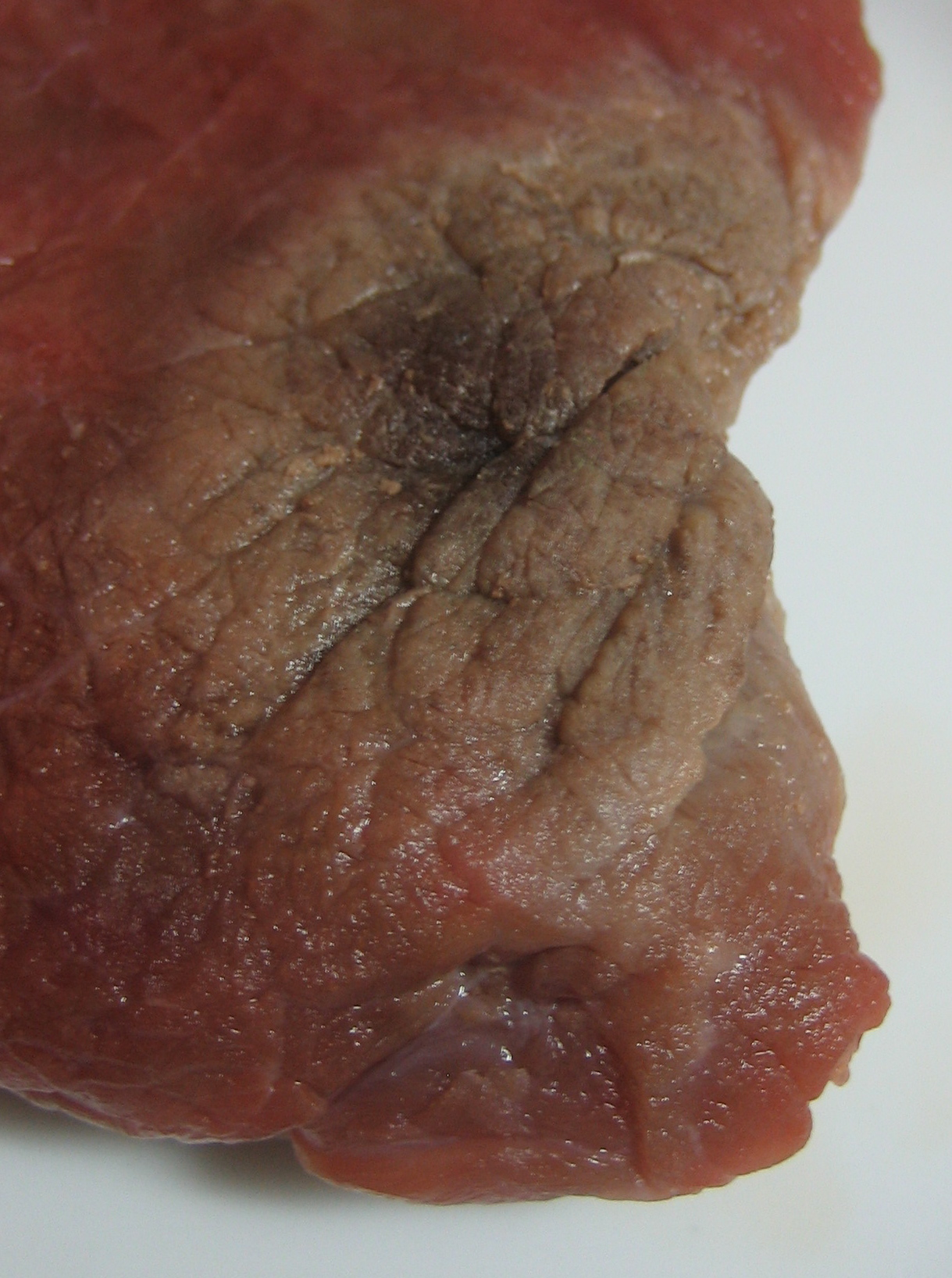
Freezer burn on a piece of beef

Freezer burn is a condition that occurs when frozen food has been damaged by dehydration and oxidation due to air reaching the food. It is generally caused by food not being securely wrapped in air-tight packaging.

Freezer burn appears as grayish-brown leathery spots on frozen food and occurs when air reaches the food's surface and dries the product. Color changes result from chemical changes in the food's pigment. Freezer burn does not make the food unsafe; it merely causes dry spots in foods. The food remains usable and edible, but removing the freezer burns can improve the flavor.

The dehydration of freezer-burned food is caused by water sublimating from the food into the surrounding atmosphere. The lost water may then be deposited elsewhere in the food and packaging as snow-like crystals. Fluctuation of temperatures in a freezer, such that the temperature does not remain consistently below −18 °C, can also speed up freezer burn.

== See also ==
- Freeze drying
- Ice crystals
