= Pyebaek =

Korean post-wedding custom

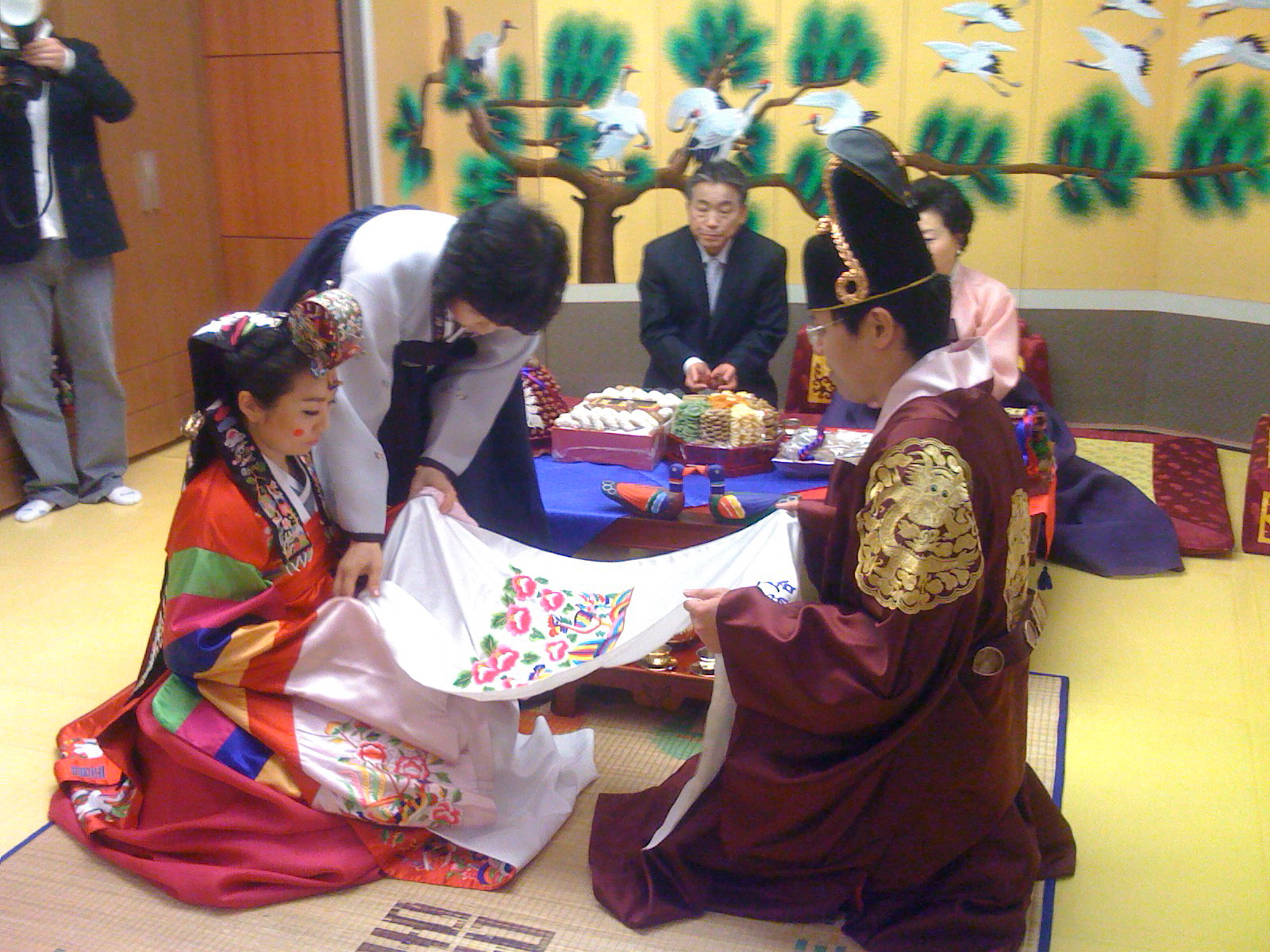

Korean name
- Hangul: 폐백
- Hanja: 幣帛
- RR: pyebaek
- MR: p'yebaek

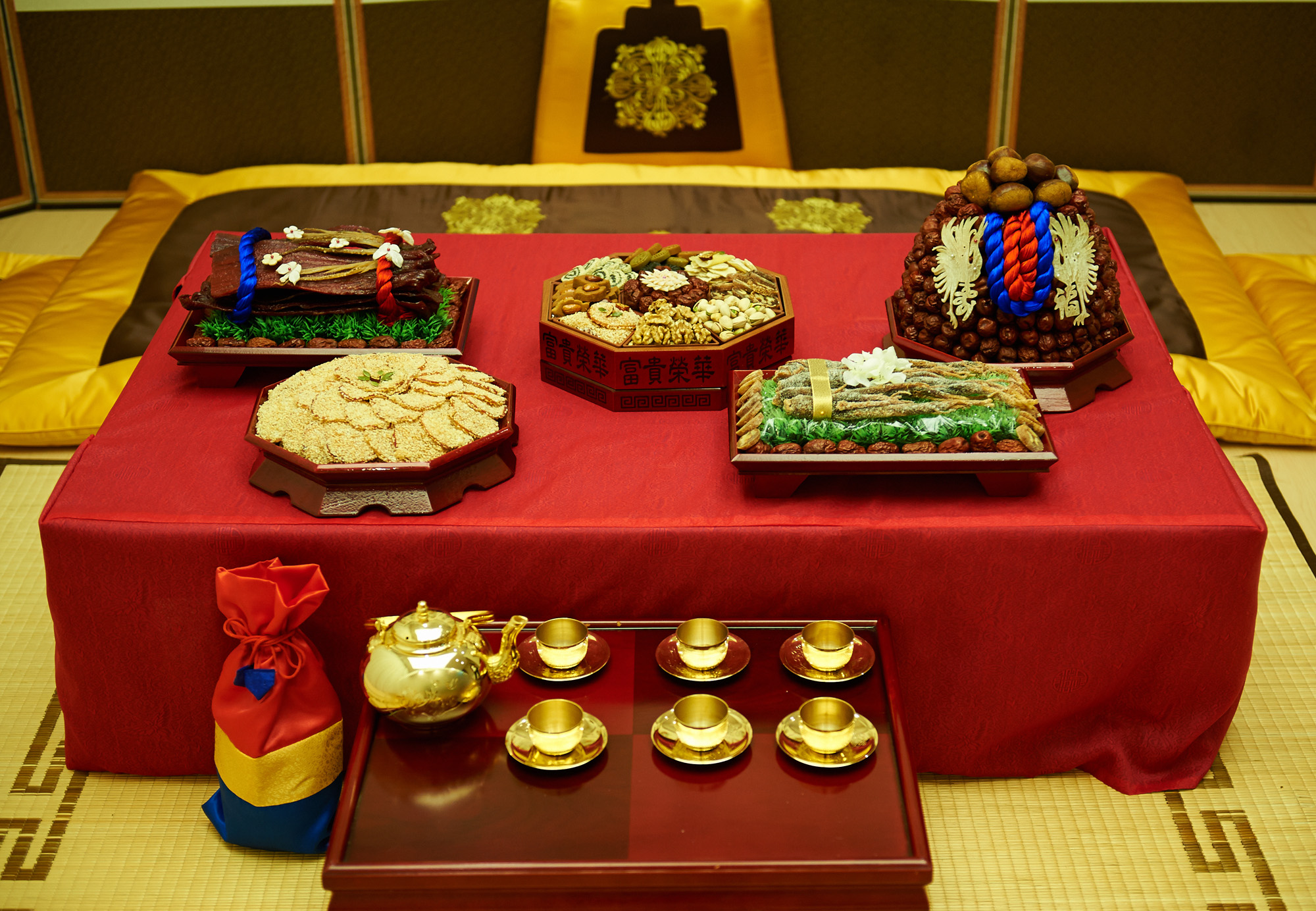
Pyebaek table

Pyebaek (Korean: 폐백) is a Korean wedding custom that is traditionally held a few days after the official ceremony, with only family members present. The ceremony begins with the older couple seated on cushions behind a table in front of a painted screen, with the newlyweds opposite them. The newlyweds perform a deep bow which begins standing and ends with the newlyweds pressing their foreheads to their hands while kneeling on the floor. The bride may present the groom's parents with jujubes (Korean dates) and chestnuts, which symbolize children. A variation will have the newlyweds offering cups of wine, usually cheongju. The bride offers the cup to the father, and the groom offers the cup to the mother. Sometimes the parents will then also offer the newlyweds cups of cheongju or soju. The older couple then shares some wisdom on marriage from their advanced experience. Finally they will throw the jujubes and chestnuts back at the bride, who has to try catching them with her wedding skirt.

In the United States, this ritual is held a few days before the ceremony. The bride may also receive gifts of money in white envelopes.

Modern Korean weddings have incorporated the Pyebaek ceremony after the reception. The original Pyebaek was exclusively for the groom's side of the family to be introduced to the new family member, the bride. In current day Korean weddings, they have also allowed for the Pyebaek ceremony to be with the brides side of the family also.

Commercial services exist to assist those unfamiliar with how the ceremony is performed.

== Food ==
Pye-baek includes food traditionally prepared by the bride's mother, chosen with consideration for the journey to the groom's home. Each item carries symbolic meaning. Common offerings include dried or sweetened dates and chestnuts, which are tossed into the bride's lap by the in-laws to symbolize fertility and the number of children the couple may have.

A ritual often follows in which the bride holds a date between her teeth while the groom bites the other end; the one who ends up with the pit is said to determine the gender of their first child based on their wish.

Handmade meat jerky is commonly given to the groom's mother as an expression of love and respect. A platter of nine anju (안주)—small snacks or finger foods—is presented to the groom's father, particularly if he enjoys drinking. The number nine symbolizes completeness and serves as a wish for good fortune and prosperity. Gotgam (곶감), dried persimmons, are especially prized as an offering to parents-in-law: because the persimmon tree must be grafted in order to grow, persimmons symbolize the couple's union and the shared endurance of life experiences.

Other traditional foods may include yakgwa (약과), sweet fried cookies symbolizing wealth; sujeonggwa (수정과), a cinnamon punch representing warmth and harmony; and sikhye (식혜), a sweet rice drink signifying sweetness in marriage. In modern Korean wedding receptions, traditional fare is often served alongside international cuisine.

== Attire ==
Couples traditionally wear hwarot (활옷), ceremonial attire consisting of a jeogori (저고리), or wide-sleeved jacket, and a flowing skirt. Once reserved for queens during the Goryeo and Joseon Dynasties, the hwarot later became special occasion wear for commoners.

The bride's hanbok often includes a green jeogori with an X-shaped design, a waistband, and a red chima (skirt) embroidered with symbols of longevity, fertility, and good fortune. Her hairstyle is typically traditional, decorated with pins and a ceremonial crown known as jokduri. Some brides also apply red dots to their cheeks to signify youth and purity.

The groom wears a blue hanbok with an overcoat called dopo and a black hat known as gat. His pyebaek robe resembles garments worn by low-ranking officials in the Joseon Dynasty. Family members may wear hanbok in relationship-appropriate colors. In modern ceremonies, the mother-in-law may wear hanbok, while the father-in-law opts for a suit.

== Reverse acculturation ==
YoungHee Kim and Sung-Yeon Park, professors at Bowling Green State University, view the resurgence of this traditional wedding practice as an example of reverse acculturation and cultural integration in which individuals both adapt to a new culture while maintaining a connection to the native culture. By adding the Pyebaek ceremony to their wedding festivities, Korean Americans, whether they are marrying another individual of Korean heritage or not, have begun to introduce their heritage culture into the mainstream culture of the United States.

== See also ==
- Marriage in Korea
- Culture of Korea
- Hanbok
- Korean-Americans
