= Muenster, Saskatchewan =

Village in Saskatchewan, Canada

Village of Muenster
- Village
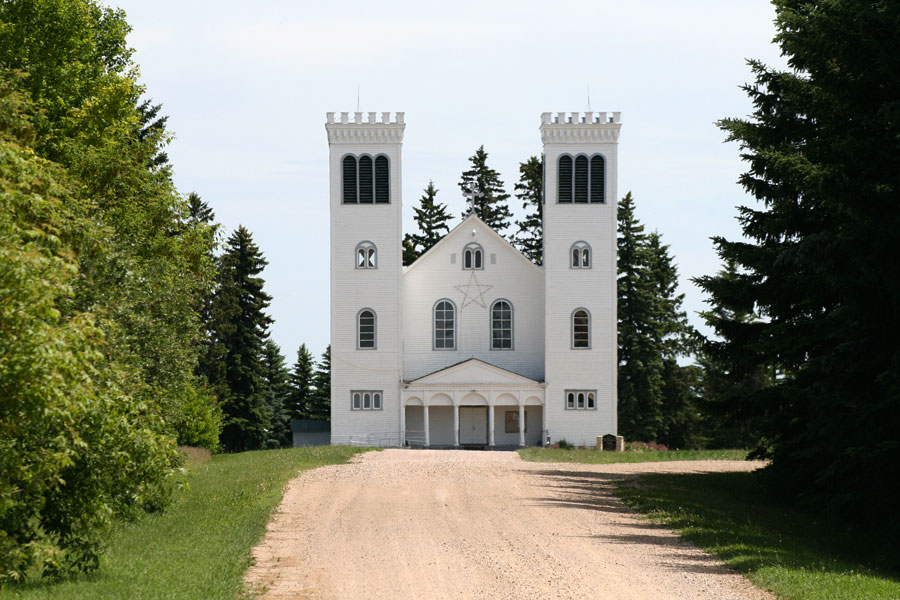
- St. Peter's Cathedral

- Location within Saskatchewan Location within Canada
- Coordinates: 52.191°N 104.995°W
- Country: Canada
- Province: Saskatchewan
- Census division: 15
- Rural municipality: St. Peter No. 369
- Post office founded: 1903
- Incorporated (Village): 1908
- Incorporated (Town): NA

Government
  - Mayor: Davis Scott
  - Administrator: Rose M. Haeusler
  - Governing body: Muenster Village Council

Area
  - Total: 1.33 km^{2} (0.51 sq mi)

Population (2011)
  - Total: 422
  - Density: 317.2/km^{2} (822/sq mi)
- Time zone: CST
- Postal code: S0K 2Y0
- Area code: 306
- Highways: Highway 5
- Waterways: Houghton Lake

Muenster (2016 population: 430) is a village in the Canadian province of Saskatchewan within the Rural Municipality of St. Peter No. 369 and Census Division No. 15. It is located 9 kilometres (5.6 mi) east of Humboldt on Highway 5.

== History ==
Muenster incorporated as a town on August 18, 1908.

St. Peter's Abbey began in 1903 with the arrival of seven Benedictine monks.

In 1921 St. Peter's Abbey became the Territorial Abbey of Saint Peter-Muenster. The abbot's duties were similar to those of a bishop of a diocese. The Territorial Abbey was suppressed in 1998 to become part of the Roman Catholic Diocese of Saskatoon.

The historic territory of the abbey was also referred to as St. Peter's Colony. The villages and parishes in St. Peter's Colony included: St. Peter's monastery and parish at Muenster, St. Boniface (Leofeld), Englefeld, Annaheim, Bruno, St. Joseph (Old Fulda), Marysburg, Humboldt, Lake Lenore, St. John Baptist (Willmont), Watson, St. Martin, St. Scholastico, St. Patrick's, St. Oswald Immaculate Conception. Dana, St. Gregor, St. Bernard (Old Pilger), St. Leo (St. Meinrad), St. Gertrude, Carmel, Peterson, Cudworth, Naicam, Holy Family Mission, St. Benedict, Pilger, St. James, and Middle Lake.

The majority of the early settlers in the region were German speaking Roman Catholics from the United States.

In 1938, a German-language newspaper published in Muenster, St. Peter's Bode, was "banned from Germany by order of Heinrich Himmler, chief of the National police." The paper's editor, Reverend Father Peters, responded: "All we did was print the facts. We carried little editorial content or criticism on German affairs."

== Climate ==
Climate data for Muenster
Month	Jan	Feb	Mar	Apr	May	Jun	Jul	Aug	Sep	Oct	Nov	Dec	Year
Record high °C (°F)	6.7 (44.1)	10 (50)	29.4 (84.9)	32.2 (90.0)	37.2 (99.0)	40 (104)	41.1 (106.0)	38.3 (100.9)	35 (95)	31.7 (89.1)	26.1 (79.0)	10.6 (51.1)	41.1 (106.0)
Mean daily maximum °C (°F)	−13.4 (7.9)	−9.2 (15.4)	−2.3 (27.9)	8.5 (47.3)	17.2 (63.0)	21.4 (70.5)	23.5 (74.3)	23.1 (73.6)	16.6 (61.9)	9.1 (48.4)	−3.2 (26.2)	−11 (12)	6.7 (44.1)
Daily mean °C (°F)	−17.9 (−0.2)	−13.6 (7.5)	−6.8 (19.8)	3.2 (37.8)	10.8 (51.4)	15.3 (59.5)	17.4 (63.3)	16.7 (62.1)	10.7 (51.3)	3.9 (39.0)	−7 (19)	−15.2 (4.6)	1.5 (34.7)
Mean daily minimum °C (°F)	−22.4 (−8.3)	−18 (0)	−11.2 (11.8)	−2.2 (28.0)	4.4 (39.9)	9.2 (48.6)	11.2 (52.2)	10.2 (50.4)	4.8 (40.6)	−1.3 (29.7)	−10.7 (12.7)	−19.4 (−2.9)	−3.8 (25.2)
Record low °C (°F)	−48.3 (−54.9)	−48.3 (−54.9)	−40.6 (−41.1)	−30.6 (−23.1)	−13.3 (8.1)	−5.6 (21.9)	−2.2 (28.0)	−4.4 (24.1)	−15 (5)	−26.7 (−16.1)	−36.7 (−34.1)	−46.7 (−52.1)	−48.3 (−54.9)
Average precipitation mm (inches)	20.8 (0.82)	14.4 (0.57)	18.8 (0.74)	23.6 (0.93)	44.8 (1.76)	76.5 (3.01)	70.6 (2.78)	47.9 (1.89)	35.8 (1.41)	25 (1.0)	15.8 (0.62)	20.2 (0.80)	414.2 (16.31)
Source: Environment Canada

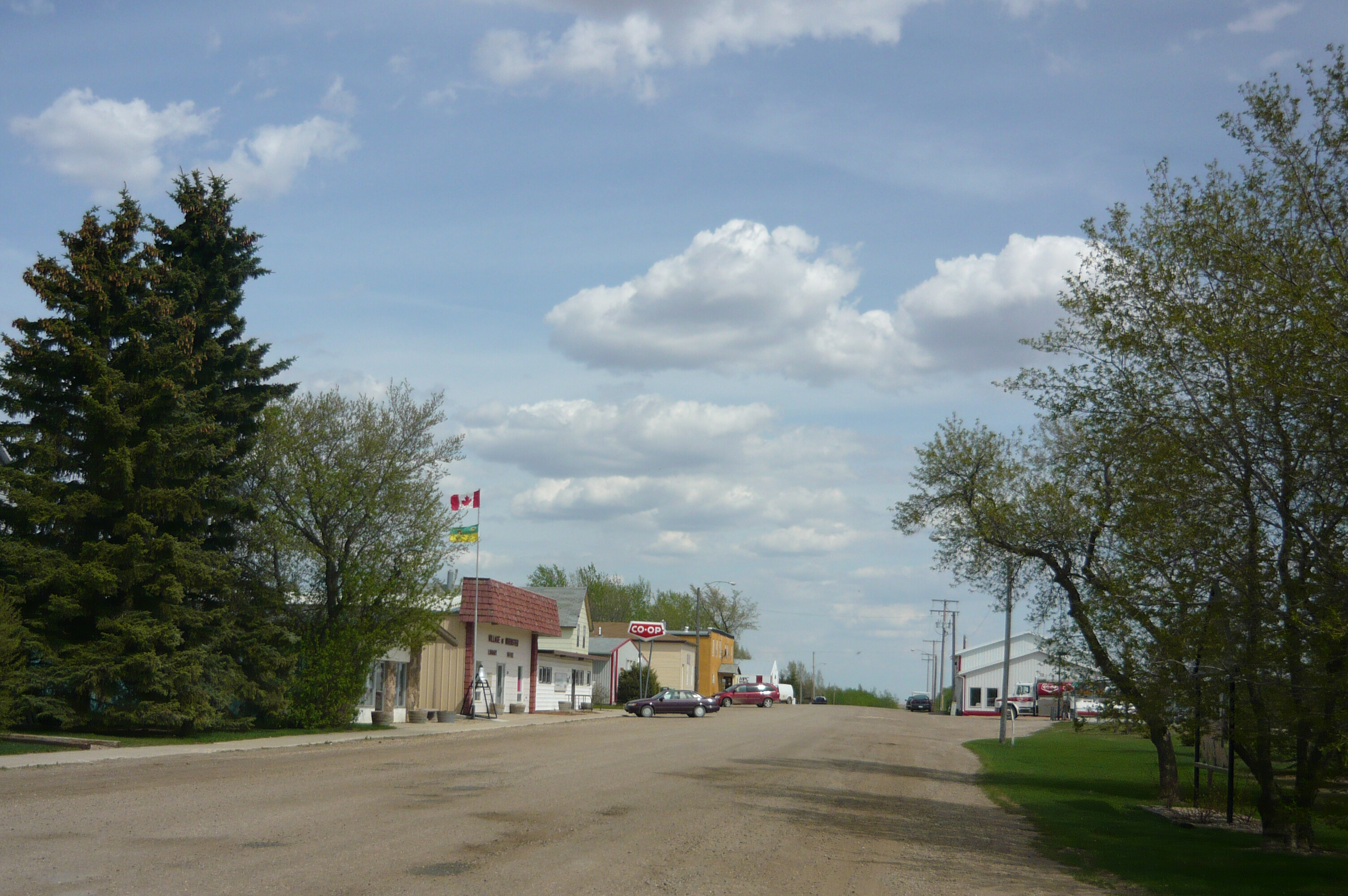
The town's main drag, Railway Street

== Demographics ==
Population history (1981–2016)
Year	Pop.	±%
1981	385	—
1986	405	+5.2%
1991	385	−4.9%
1996	381	−1.0%
2001	379	−0.5%
2006	342	−9.8%
2011	422	+23.4%
2016	430	+1.9%
Source: Statistics Canada via Saskatchewan Bureau of Statistics

In the 2021 Census of Population conducted by Statistics Canada, Muenster had a population of 403 living in 173 of its 186 total private dwellings, a change of −6.3% from its 2016 population of 430. With a land area of 1.36 km^{2} (0.53 sq mi), it had a population density of 296.3/km^{2} (767.5/sq mi) in 2021.

In the 2016 Census of Population, the Village of Muenster recorded a population of 430 living in 176 of its 184 total private dwellings, a 1.9% change from its 2011 population of 422. With a land area of 1.33 km^{2} (0.51 sq mi), it had a population density of 323.3/km^{2} (837.4/sq mi) in 2016.

== Education ==
Muenster is home to St. Peter's College, an affiliate of the University of Saskatchewan. It was founded by the Benedictine monks of St. Peter's Abbey in 1921. The college offers a full first year of Arts and Sciences classes and senior classes in several disciplines. Annual full-time enrollment is limited to 150 students.

== Muenster landmarks ==
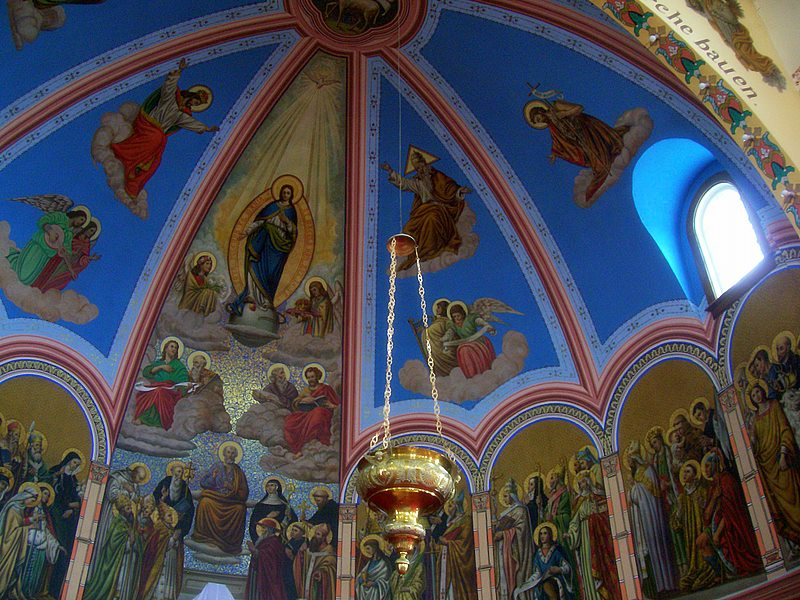
Muenster church

Michael Hall, St. Peter's College

- St. Peter's Cathedral features paintings and murals by the artist Berthold Imhoff
- The skyline of Muenster is mainly defined by the steeples of St. Peter's College and Abbey
- Muenster Hill is a popular local tobogganing destination
- St. Peter's College library is the third largest book repository in Saskatchewan
- Wolverine Creek runs through Muenster, past St. Peter's College and Abbey

== Events ==
St. Peter's Abbey is host to the annual Junior and Teen Choir Camps of the Saskatchewan Choral Federation.

== Sports ==
Muenster was home to the Muenster Red Sox, a senior baseball team. The Red Sox played in the North Central Baseball League from 1964–2003 and have in the Saskatoon Senior League until 2009. The Muenster Midget AAA Red Sox currently compete in the Saskatchewan Premier Baseball League, capturing the provincial title in 2016 and winning a bronze medal at nationals that same year. The community is also active in hockey and soccer.

== Notable people ==
Notable persons who were born, grew up in or established their fame in Muenster:

- Ralph Klassen, professional ice hockey player

== See also ==
- List of communities in Saskatchewan
- List of villages in Saskatchewan
