= St. Peter's Abbey, Saskatchewan =

Benedictine monastery in Canada

Coordinates: 52°11′32″N 104°59′53″W

Location of St. Peter's Abbey in Saskatchewan

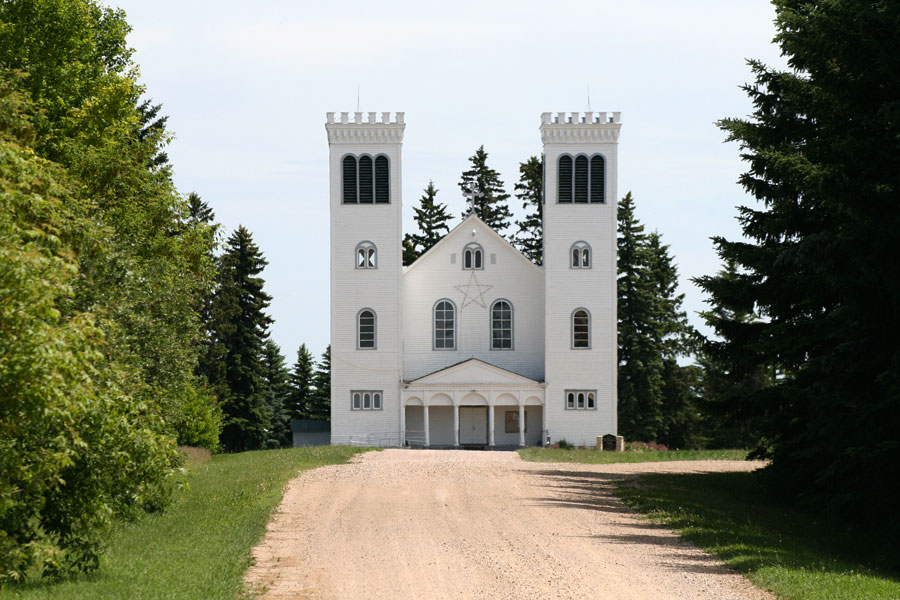
St. Peter's Cathedral

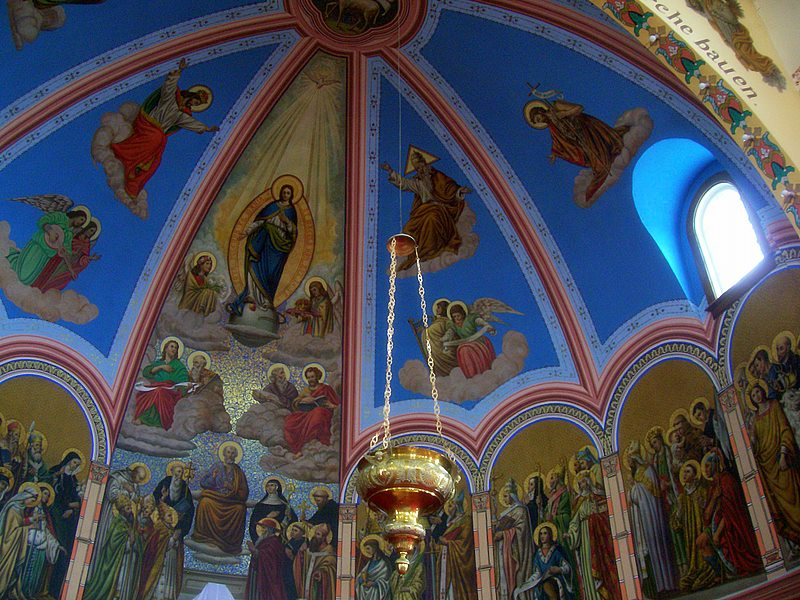
St. Peter's Cathedral interior

Michael Hall, St. Peter's College

St. Peter's Abbey is in Muenster, Saskatchewan, Canada. It is the oldest Benedictine monastery in Canada. It was founded in 1903.

== History ==
St. Peter's Abbey began in 1903 with the arrival of seven Benedictine monks under the obedience of Peter Engel O.S.B. the abbot of Saint John's Abbey in Collegeville, Minnesota. Many German speaking Roman Catholic immigrants had settled in the area and by 1903 they had over 700 homesteads. The monks established parishes and were able to serve their congregations in the German language.

St. Peter Abbey became independent in 1911 and Bruno Doerfler became its first abbot.

In 1921 St. Peter's Abbey became the Territorial Abbey of Saint Peter-Muenster. It was formed from a piece of the Diocese of Prince Albert 4,662 square kilometres (1,800 square miles) in size. It included 50 townships; townships 35 to 40, ranges 18 to 22, and townships 37 to 41, ranges 23 to 26 of the Dominion Land Survey west of the 2nd Meridian. The abbot's duties were similar to those of a bishop of a diocese. The Territorial Abbey was suppressed in 1998 to become part of the Roman Catholic Diocese of Saskatoon.

Today it remains an abbey, but is no longer a separate jurisdiction.

St. Peter's Cathedral was built between 1909 and 1910 and decorated by artist Berthold Imhoff in 1919. The church served as the cathedral of the territorial abbey. Located about one kilometre from the village of Muenster it was listed on the Canadian Register of Historic Places in 2008.

A new church was built adjoining the abbey and St. Peter's College in 1989.

== Overview ==
As of February 2016, it is home to 18 Benedictine monks. This includes 8 priests, and 10 brothers. The abbot of St. Peter's is Peter Novecosky. They follow the monastic Rule of St. Benedict. St. Benedict wrote a rule for Christian life known for its balance and moderation; this life provides a balance between prayer, work and study for the monks.

== Abbots ==
Priors of St. Peter's Priory

- Alfred Mayer, O.S.B. (1901-1906)
- Bruno Doerfler, O.S.B. (elected 1906)

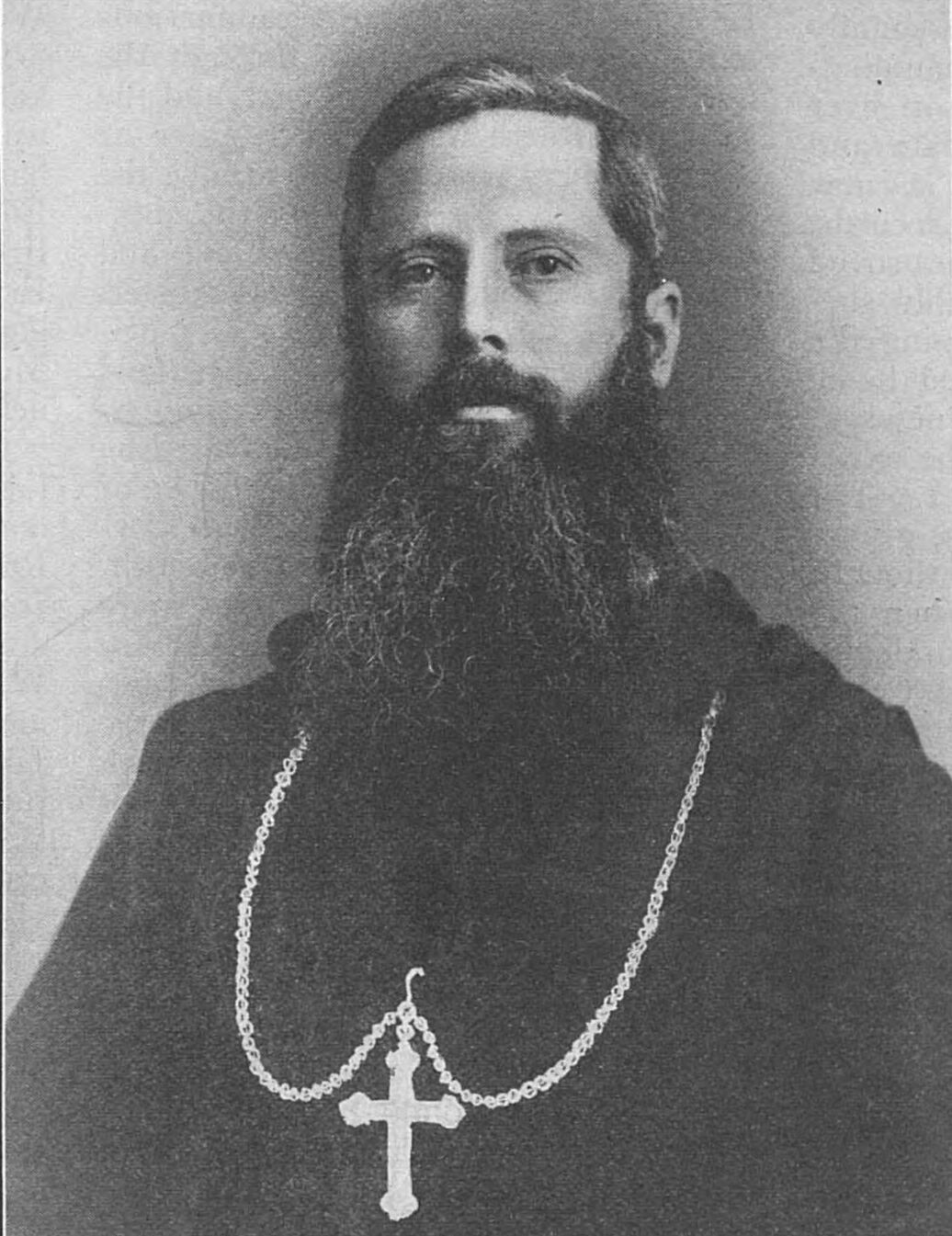
Abbot Bruno Doerfler, O.S.B.

Abbots of the Territorial Abbey of Saint Peter-Muenster

- Bruno Doerfler, O.S.B. (1911 Appointed - 1919 Died)
- Michael Ott, O.S.B. (1919 elected - 1926 resigned)
- Severin Jacob Gertken, O.S.B. (5 Oct 1926 Confirmed - 1960 Died)
- Jerome Ferdinand Weber, O.S.B. (28 Jun 1960 Confirmed - 15 Jun 1990 Retired)
- Peter Wilfred Novecosky, O.S.B. (19 Oct 1990 Confirmed - 14 Sep 1998 Resigned)

Abbots of St. Peter's Abbey

- Peter Novecosky, O.S.B. (1998 - 2024 Died)

== St. Peter's Colony ==
The historic territory of the abbey was also referred to as St. Peter's Colony. 8,000 settlers had arrived in the colony by 1910 and by 1930 it was home to 18,000 Roman Catholics. Most were German Catholics.

=== Parishes ===
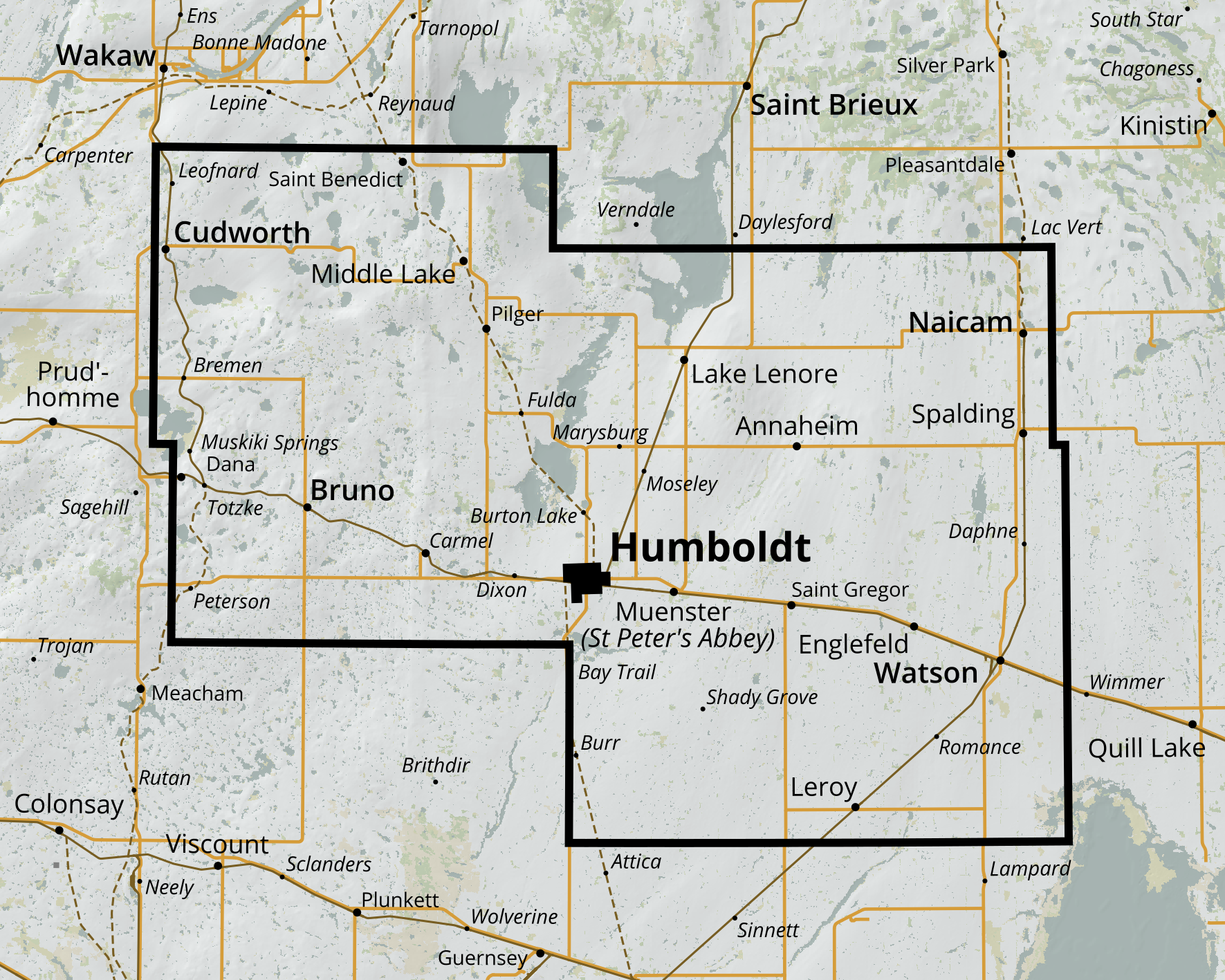
Map of the extent of the Territorial Abbey.

The parishes of St. Peter's Colony served by the Benedictine monks of St. Peter's Abbey and their foundation dates included:

- Leofeld: St. Boniface Parish founded May 17, 1903. was the first church of St. Peter's Colony.
- Muenster: St. Peter's May 21, 1903.
- Fulda July 18, 1903: St. Joseph
- Marysburg July 19, 1903: Marysburg Assumption Church
- Annaheim July 22, 1903: St. Ann Church
- Englefeld: Holy Guardian Angels was founded Aug. 1, 1903
- Watson May 18, 1904: Sacred Heart Church was founded in 1903
- Lake Lenore May 29, 1904: St. Anthony Church.
- Bruno July 18, 1904: St. Bruno Church was founded in 1904 In 1919 the Ursuline Sisters opened a convent and in 1922 St. Ursula's Academy.
- Humboldt 1905: St. Augustine Church was founded in 1905. St. Elizabeth Convent Cemetery in Humboldt. The first burial was in 1916 with 62 burials by 1996. The Franciscan Sisters of St. Elizabeth arrived from Austria in 1911 and founded a hospital in Humboldt.
- Burr Oct. 15, 1905: St. Scholastico Church near Burr
- Romance, Southwest of Watson Oct. 1906: St. Oswald Church. Cemetery records the first burial was in 1909.
- St. Gregor Jan. 17, 1907: St. Gregory the Great. The first church was built in 1907.
- Pilger Aug. 4, 1907: Holy Trinity Church, St. Bernard (Old Pilger)
- St. Benedict 1907: St. Benedict Church
- Dana June 24, 1907: St. Maurus Church was founded in 1907.
- Carmel 1908: Our Lady of Mount Carmel Church. Located north is the Shrine of Our Lady of Mount Carmel. The work was commissioned by Abbot Serverin Gertkin of St. Peter's Abbey. An annual pilgrimage has been held on the site since 1922
- Cudworth Dec. 8, 1912: St. Michael Church
- Middle Lake 1915: Canadian Martyrs Church
- Peterson 1924: St. Agnes Church
- Naicam May 19, 1925: St. George's
