= Rural Municipality of St. Peter No. 369 =

Rural municipality in Saskatchewan, Canada

St. Peter No. 369
- Rural municipality
- Rural Municipality of St. Peter No. 369
- Location of the RM of St. Peter No. 369 in Saskatchewan
- Coordinates: 52.266°N 104.831°W
- Country: Canada
- Province: Saskatchewan
- Census division: 15
- SARM division: 5
- Formed: December 11, 1911

Government
  - Reeve: Lyle Dosch
  - Governing body: RM of St. Peter No. 369 Council
  - Administrator: Angie Peake
  - Office location: Annaheim

Area (2016)
  - Land: 823.21 km^{2} (317.84 sq mi)

Population (2016)
  - Total: 773
  - Density: 0.9/km^{2} (2.3/sq mi)
- Time zone: CST
  - Summer (DST): CST
- Area codes: 306 and 639

The Rural Municipality of St. Peter No. 369 (2016 population: 773) is a rural municipality (RM) in the Canadian province of Saskatchewan within Census Division No. 15 and SARM Division No. 5.

== History ==
The RM of St. Peter No. 369 was largely settled during the early 20th century by German-American Roman Catholics from Stearns County, Minnesota.

St. Peter's Abbey began in 1903 with the arrival of seven Benedictine monks under the obedience of Peter Engel O.S.B. the abbot of Saint John's Abbey in Collegeville, Minnesota. The monks established parishes and were able to serve local congregations due to their knowledge of the distinctive Stearns County dialect of the German language.

St. Peter was incorporated as a rural municipality on December 11, 1911.

== Geography ==
=== Communities and localities ===
The following urban municipalities are surrounded by the RM.

Villages

- Annaheim
- Englefeld
- Lake Lenore
- St. Gregor
- Muenster

== Demographics ==
Population history (1981–2016)
Year	Pop.	±%
1981	1,395	—
1986	1,298	−7.0%
1991	1,086	−16.3%
1996	949	−12.6%
2001	917	−3.4%
2006	901	−1.7%
2011	790	−12.3%
2016	773	−2.2%
Source: Statistics Canada via Saskatchewan Bureau of Statistics

In the 2021 Census of Population conducted by Statistics Canada, the RM of St. Peter No. 369 had a population of 723 living in 278 of its 299 total private dwellings, a change of −6.5% from its 2016 population of 773. With a land area of 827.39 km^{2} (319.46 sq mi), it had a population density of 0.9/km^{2} (2.3/sq mi) in 2021.

In the 2016 Census of Population, the RM of St. Peter No. 369 recorded a population of 773 living in 277 of its 300 total private dwellings, a −2.2% change from its 2011 population of 790. With a land area of 823.21 km^{2} (317.84 sq mi), it had a population density of 0.9/km^{2} (2.4/sq mi) in 2016.

== Government ==
The RM of St. Peter No. 369 is governed by an elected municipal council and an appointed administrator that meets on the second Thursday of every month. The reeve of the RM is Lyle Dosch while its administrator is Angie Peake. The RM's office is located in Annaheim.

== Transportation ==
- Canadian National Railway
- Saskatchewan Highway 5
- Saskatchewan Highway 368
- Saskatchewan Highway 756
- Saskatchewan Highway 777

== See also ==
- Francis Xavier Pierz
- List of rural municipalities in Saskatchewan
