= Berthold Imhoff =

German painter

Berthold von Imhoff
- Born: January 14, 1861; Mannheim, Grand Duchy of Baden
- Died: December 14, 1939 (aged 78); St. Walburg, Saskatchewan, Canada
- Known for: artist who made frescoes, oil paintings
- Spouse: Matilda Johner
- Awards: Order of St. Gregory the Great

Count Berthold von Imhoff (January 14, 1861 – December 14, 1939) was an artist known for his religious murals and paintings. Born in Germany in 1868, Imhoff immigrated to the United States with his family and settled in Reading, Pennsylvania, where he established a successful art and fresco business. He left Reading in 1914, and made his home and studio in the St. Walburg, Saskatchewan, area in Canada. From there he decorated churches in many rural villages of Saskatchewan and North Dakota as well as returning to Reading for commissioned work.

== Early life ==
Imhoff was born in Mannheim, Grand Duchy of Baden (now Baden-Württemberg, Germany), to Count Leopold and Rosina (Allgeier) von Imhoff. At age 12, he started studying at various European art schools including Oberwinter, Halle-an-der-Halle, and the art institute at Karlsruhe, Baden. In 1884, Imhoff won the Art Academy Award of Berlin for his painting The Glory of Emperor Frederick. $3000 was offered for the painting, but he refused, and the painting is now on display at the Lloydminster Cultural and Science Centre in Lloydminster, Saskatchewan. At age 20, Imhoff began studying figure work at the art academy at Düsseldorf.

== Life in North America ==
In 1891, Berthold Imhoff married Matilde Johner, the daughter of Joseph Johner, who was one of his teachers at Bonndorf. Berthold Imhoff began to feel oppressed by European society, and decided to move to North America. His family settled in Reading, Pennsylvania, where he established an art and fresco business. Imhoff's fame soon escalated as he travelled the eastern United States painting churches and homes of wealthy industrialists. As the eastern United States began to become an industrial powerhouse, Imhoff decided to move to Canada. Searching for a quiet, peaceful place to work on his art, Imhoff, Matilde, and six of his seven children moved to what is now St. Walburg, Saskatchewan, in 1914. Once in Saskatchewan, Imhoff started painting many of the small churches which dot the prairie landscape near his home, often for free or for very little pay. In 1926, Imhoff completed what some people consider his masterpiece: the cathedral in Reading, Pennsylvania. Many of the 226 life-sized paintings were started in his studio in Saskatchewan and then transported to Reading where they were then completed by him and his family. In 1937, he was awarded a Knighthood in the Pontifical Order of St. Gregory the Great by Pope Pius XI. He died in 1939 and is buried in the St. Walburg Roman Catholic Cemetery next to his wife Matilda. A life size equestrian statue honouring Imhoff by St. Walburg artist Susan Velder is located in the village. The Imhoff Gallery which includes his studio, home and farm is now a heritage site.

== Works ==
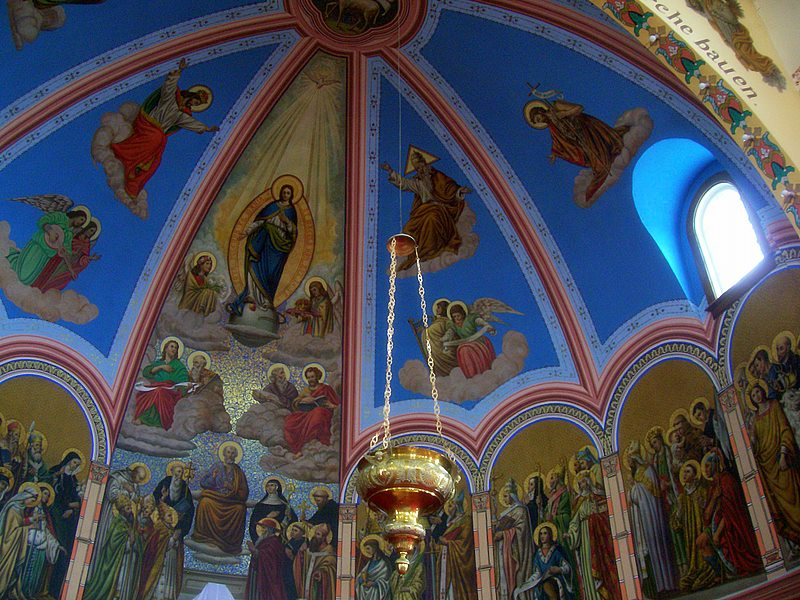
St. Peter's Cathedral in Muenster, Saskatchewan

Imhoff decorated over 90 churches. Examples of his work can be seen in churches at Carmel, St. Benedict, Bruno, Denzil, St. Leo, North Battleford in Saskatchewan and at the following locations.

=== Canada ===
- St. Walburg & District Historical Museum (Assumption of the Blessed Virgin Mary Church)
- Imhoff Museum and Art Gallery near St. Walburg, Saskatchewan
- St. Peter's Cathedral in Muenster, Saskatchewan
- Shrine of the Holy Rosary at Reward, Saskatchewan
- Our Lady of Sorrows in Paradise Hill, Saskatchewan
- Assumption Catholic Church in Marysburg, Saskatchewan
- Lloydminster Cultural and Science Centre Lloydminster, Saskatchewan
- Sacred Heart Cathedral in Prince Albert, Saskatchewan

=== United States ===
- Sts. Peter and Paul Catholic Church in Richmond, Minnesota
- Sts. Peter and Paul Catholic Church in Karlsruhe, North Dakota
- St. Mary's Catholic Church in Hague, North Dakota
- Blessed Trinity Church (formerly the Holy Trinity of Krasna) near Strasburg, North Dakota
- Sts. Peter & Paul Roman Catholic Church in Strasburg, North Dakota
- First United Church of Christ in Reading, Pennsylvania
- St. Peter the Apostle Catholic Church in Reading, Pennsylvania
- Church of the Most Blessed Sacrament Bally, Pennsylvania
- St. Paul's United Church of Christ in Schaefferstown, Pennsylvania
- Salem United Church of Christ in Oley Township, Berks County, Pennsylvania
- Other works by Imhoff in the Reading, Pennsylvania area might still exist at the following locations.
  - St. John's Catholic Church at Pottsville
  - St. Mary's Catholic Church at York
  - German Catholic Church at Hazleton
  - Catholic Church at Williamsport
  - Trinity Lutheran Church, Reading
  - Lithuanian Catholic Church, Mahanoy City
  - Baptist Church, Reading
  - Spies's Union Church, Alsace township
  - Reformed Church, Hazleton
  - Lutheran Church, Myerstown
  - St. Paul's Roman Catholic Church, Reading

== Videos ==
- Prairie Churches immigrant church artist
- Count Berthold Von Imhoff Part 1
- Count Berthold Von Imhoff Part 2
