= Marysburg Assumption Church =

Roman Catholic church in Saskatchewan, Canada

Coordinates: 52°19′4″N 105°04′18″W

Religion
- Affiliation: Roman Catholic
- Province: Saskatchewan

Location
- Location: Marysburg, Saskatchewan
- Interactive map of Marysburg Assumption Church

Architecture
- Type: Church
- Style: Romanesque Revival and Classical Revival
- Groundbreaking: 1920
- Completed: 1921
- Capacity: 400+

Website
- Assumption Church Marysburg

Marysburg Assumption Church & Centre Of The Arts is a Roman Catholic church in the hamlet of Marysburg within the Rural Municipality of Humboldt No. 370 in Saskatchewan, Canada. The church was designated as a municipal heritage building on September 13, 1983. The brick building contains two towers and is of a Romanesque Revival style while the interior exhibits a Classical Revival influence. The Assumption Church is about 13 kilometres (8.1 mi) north of Humboldt on Highway 20 and 3.2 kilometres (2.0 mi) east on Marysburg Grid 756.

The church can hold over 400 people and makes extensive use of stained glass. The interior is decorated with works by the artist Berthold Imhoff. Thirty two Imhoff paintings were purchased in 1948.

== Restoration ==
Assumption Church Restoration Committee was formed in 1998, when the parish had shrunk to 25 families.

From 1998 to the end of 2003, new furnaces were installed, the foundation repaired, the brick exterior repaired, insulation pumped between roof and ceiling, and both nave and side wings given new roofs. This was financed entirely by local initiative.

2004 saw the start of major renovations to the interior. Mike Labelle of Western Restoration was hired and as a result the interior of the church was plastered and painted. Paintings by Berthold Imhoff were cleaned, repaired and remounted on the walls of the church in the winter of 2006.

The Assumption Church Restoration Committee received the Saskatchewan Architectural Heritage Award in September 2009 in the category of long-term stewardship.
