= St Peter's College, Muenster =

Coordinates: 52°11′33″N 104°59′53″W

St Peter's College
- Motto: Begin, Belong, Become
- Type: Public
- Established: 1921
- Affiliations: University of Saskatchewan
- President: Robert Harasymchuk
- Location: Muenster, Saskatchewan, Canada
- Campus: Rural
- Website: www.stpeterscollege.ca

St Peter's College was established by Benedictine monks of St. Peter's Abbey in 1921. St. Peter's Abbey was founded in 1903 on the same site as the college. From 1921 until 1972 the College also offered a boys high school program. Today the college offers the first two years of the University of Saskatchewan Arts and Science program. The College is located in a rural setting, approximately a one-hour drive from the University of Saskatchewan campus.

The college became affiliated with the University of Saskatchewan in 1926.

== Past Principals/Presidents ==
- 1924-1931 - Wilfred Hergott, OSB
- 1931-1935 - Matthew Michel, OSB
- 1935-1960 - Xavier Benning, OSB
- 1960-1966 - Albert Ruetz, OSB
- 1966-1972 - Vincent Morrison, OSB
- 1972, 1976-1983 - Andrew Britz, OSB
- 1972-1976, 1983-1989 - Maurice Weber, OSB
- 1989-1993 - Tony Saretsky, B.Ed., B.A.
- 1993-1998 - Wendy Schissel, Ph.D
- 1993-1998 - Barry Popowich, Ph.D
- 1998-2005 - Colleen Fitzgerald, Ph.D
- 2005-2009 - Rob Harasymchuk
- 2010 - 2011 - Glen Kobussen
- 2011 - Present - Rob Harasymchuk
