= Humboldt station (Saskatchewan) =

Railway station in Saskatchewan, Canada

Coordinates: 52.1975°N 105.1250°W

Humboldt
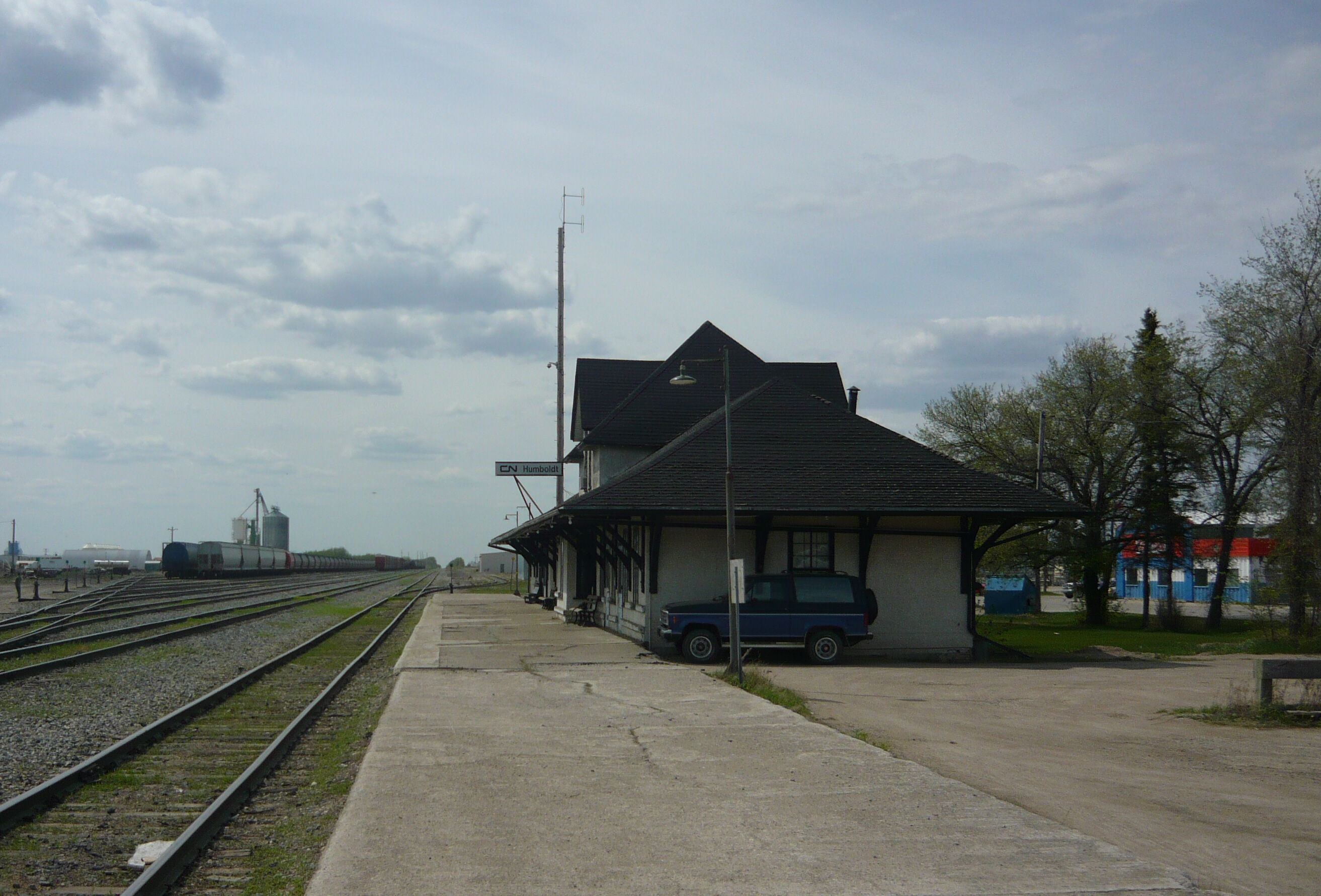
- CNR Humboldt Station, circa 2010

General information
- Location: 5th Avenue (at 9th Street), Humboldt, Saskatchewan
- Lines: Canadian Northern Railway (former); Canadian National Railway; Via Rail (former service)
- Platforms: 1 side platform
- Tracks: 1

History
- Opened: 1905
- Closed: 1980

Former services
Preceding station	Canadian National Railway	Following station
Dixon toward Calgary	Calgary – Winnipeg	Muenster toward Winnipeg
Terminus	Humboldt – Carrot River	Moseley toward Carrot River
Location

The Humboldt station is a former railway station in Humboldt, Saskatchewan. It was built by the Canadian Northern Railway along the Winnipeg to Edmonton mainline. The 1 1/2-storey, wood-frame, railway station was completed in 1905. The last CNR passenger train (Nos. 9 and 10) ended service in 1963 with service restored in 1978; a Via Rail Railliner served the station in 1980. The building was designated a historic railway station in 1992.

== See also ==
- List of designated heritage railway stations of Canada
