= Carmel, Saskatchewan =

Community in Saskatchewan, Canada

Carmel
- Hamlet
- Location in Saskatchewan Carmel (Canada)
- Coordinates: 52°13′26″N 105°21′18″W
- Country: Canada
- Province: Saskatchewan
- Census division: 15
- Rural municipality: Humboldt No. 370

Carmel is a small community in rural Saskatchewan, Canada. It is 18 kilometres (11 mi) west of Humboldt and 101 kilometres (63 mi) east of the city of Saskatoon. Carmel is within the RM of Humboldt No. 370. Access is from Highway 5.

== Mount Carmel Shrine ==
The Carmel area is home to the Shrine of Our Lady of Mount Carmel. This Roman Catholic landmark, located 4.5 km (2.7 miles) north of Carmel, was built by Antonio Molaro in 1928 (the statue foundation) and in 1937 (the chapel) on one of the highest points in east central Saskatchewan. The work was commissioned by Abbot Serverin Gertkin of St. Peter's Abbey in Muenster. The white marble statue imported from Italy is eight feet high and the foundation is 14 feet high. It was blessed in 1928. An annual pilgrimage has been held on the site since 1922

== See also ==
- List of communities in Saskatchewan
