= Mount Carmel Shrine (Saskatchewan) =

Roman Catholic landmark in Saskatchewan, Canada

Coordinates: 52°15′53″N 105°21′51″W

Mount Carmel Shrine in Saskatchewan

Mount Carmel Shrine is a Roman Catholic landmark located 4.5 km (2.7 miles) north of the hamlet of Carmel in the Rural Municipality of Humboldt No. 370, Saskatchewan, Canada. Located a top of a hill once known as Grosse Butte, the shrine is dedicated to Our Lady of Mount Carmel.

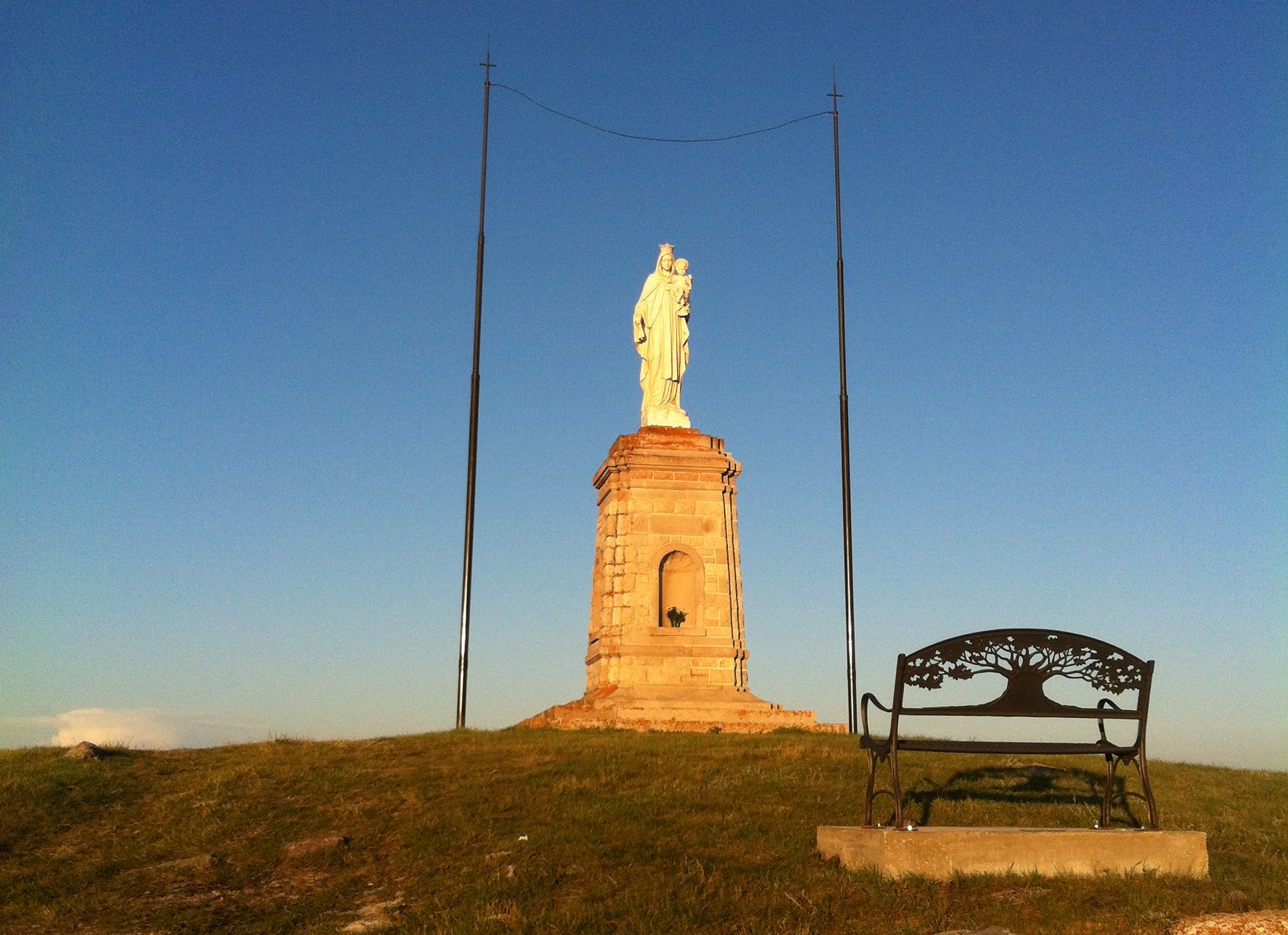
Summit of Mt. Carmel

== History ==
The land was donated to St. Peter's Abbey by John Bunko in 1921 and was dedicated in 1922 by the Abbot of St. Peter's. St. Mary under the title of Our Lady of Mount Carmel became the patroness and protectress of St. Peter's Colony, an area of 50 townships where a large number of German speaking Catholics had settled.

In 1928 a 14-foot high foundation was built by Antonio Molaro for the eight-foot high white marble statue of Mary holding the infant Jesus imported from Italy. Molaro also built the chapel and altar at the base of the hill in 1938 and the fourteen stations of the Cross leading up to the shrine in 1939.

== Pilgrimage ==
An annual pilgrimage has been held on the site since 1922. From 1922 to 1954 five to six thousand pilgrims were taking part each year with the exception of 1948 when an estimated 12,000 people attended during the Family Rosary Crusade. On July 22, 2012 on the 90th annual pilgrimage to the shrine over 450 pilgrims attended. Beginning Aug 17, 2002, as a followup to world youth day in Toronto, a one-day Catholic youth rally is held annually. Called Rock the Mount, it draws young people and families from across the prairie provinces.

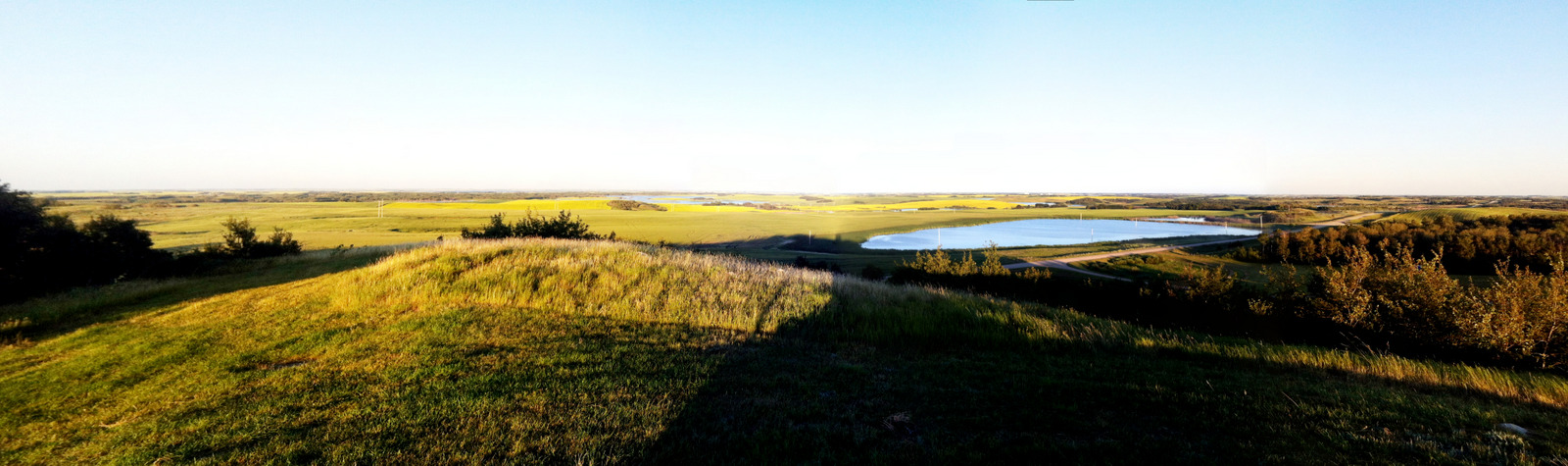
View of the fields to the east from the top of the Mount Carmel Shrine.
