= Rural Municipality of Humboldt No. 370 =

Rural municipality in Saskatchewan, Canada

Humboldt No. 370
- Rural municipality
- Rural Municipality of Humboldt No. 370

- Location of the RM of Humboldt No. 370 in Saskatchewan
- Coordinates: 52.226°N 105.104°W
- Country: Canada
- Province: Saskatchewan
- Census division: 15
- SARM division: 5
- Formed: January 1, 1913

Government
  - Reeve: Larry Ries
  - Governing body: RM of Humboldt No. 370 Council
  - Administrator: Corinne Richardson
  - Office location: Humboldt

Area (2016)
  - Land: 796.69 km^{2} (307.60 sq mi)

Population (2016)
  - Total: 935
  - Density: 1.2/km^{2} (3.1/sq mi)
- Time zone: CST
  - Summer (DST): CST
- Area codes: 306 and 639

The Rural Municipality of Humboldt No. 370 (2016 population: 935) is a rural municipality (RM) in the Canadian province of Saskatchewan within Census Division No. 15 and SARM Division No. 5. Located in the central portion of the province, it is along Highway 5 and Highway 20 north of Regina and east of Saskatoon.

== History ==
The RM of Humboldt No. 370 incorporated as a rural municipality on January 1, 1913.

Heritage properties

The RM has two designated heritage properties:

- The Humboldt Telegraph Station Site (constructed in 1876) built as part of the Dominion Telegraph Line, the station is on the original site for Humboldt, connecting Eastern Canada with Selkirk with Fort Livingstone, Clark's Crossing, Battleford, Edmonton and British Columbia. The station is located along the Carlton Trail. The site was originally composed of two cabins, the first housing the telegraph and serving as a home for George Weldon and family while the second Ducharme House serving a residence for his assistant Joe Ducharme.
- Marysburg Assumption Church located in the former hamlet of Marysburg is a Roman Catholic church constructed of brick in 1921. The church seats up to 400 and is of a Romanesque Revival style.

== Geography ==
=== Communities and localities ===
The following urban municipalities are surrounded by the RM.

Cities

- Humboldt

The following unincorporated communities are within the RM.

Localities

- Carmel
- Fulda
- Humboldt Beach, dissolved as a village February 1, 1947
- Marysburg

== Demographics ==
Population history (1981–2016)
Year	Pop.	±%
1981	1,284	—
1986	1,232	−4.0%
1991	1,065	−13.6%
1996	960	−9.9%
2001	911	−5.1%
2006	842	−7.6%
2011	885	+5.1%
2016	935	+5.6%
Source: Statistics Canada via Saskatchewan Bureau of Statistics

In the 2021 Census of Population conducted by Statistics Canada, the RM of Humboldt No. 370 had a population of 961 living in 370 of its 422 total private dwellings, a change of 2.8% from its 2016 population of 935. With a land area of 780.28 km^{2} (301.27 sq mi), it had a population density of 1.2/km^{2} (3.2/sq mi) in 2021.

In the 2016 Census of Population, the RM of Humboldt No. 370 recorded a population of 935 living in 365 of its 432 total private dwellings, a 5.6% change from its 2011 population of 885. With a land area of 796.69 km^{2} (307.60 sq mi), it had a population density of 1.2/km^{2} (3.0/sq mi) in 2016.

== Government ==
The RM of Humboldt No. 370 is governed by an elected municipal council and an appointed administrator that meets on the second Tuesday of every month. The reeve of the RM is Larry Ries while its administrator is Corinne Richardson. The RM's office is located in Humboldt.

== See also ==
- List of rural municipalities in Saskatchewan
