= St. Benedict, Saskatchewan =

Village in Saskatchewan, Canada

Coordinates: 52°34′00″N 105°23′36″W

Location of St. Benedict in Saskatchewan

St. Benedict (2016 population: 84) is a village in the Canadian province of Saskatchewan within the Rural Municipality of Three Lakes No. 400 and Census Division No. 15. Located along the Carlton Trail, it is 56 kilometres (35 mi) north of the city of Humboldt off Highway 20.

The village was founded by German immigrants in the first decades of the 20th century.

The Roman Catholic church in St. Benedict contains works by the artist Berthold Imhoff.

== History ==
St. Benedict incorporated as a village on January 1, 1964.

== Demographics ==
Population history (1981–2016)
Year	Pop.	±%
1981	157	—
1986	168	+7.0%
1991	144	−14.3%
1996	119	−17.4%
2001	109	−8.4%
2006	78	−28.4%
2011	82	+5.1%
2016	84	+2.4%
Source: Statistics Canada via Saskatchewan Bureau of Statistics

In the 2021 Census of Population conducted by Statistics Canada, St. Benedict had a population of 80 living in 41 of its 45 total private dwellings, a change of -4.8% from its 2016 population of 84. With a land area of 0.55 km^{2} (0.21 sq mi), it had a population density of 145.5/km^{2} (376.7/sq mi) in 2021.

In the 2016 Census of Population, the Village of St. Benedict recorded a population of 84 living in 43 of its 53 total private dwellings, a 2.4% change from its 2011 population of 82. With a land area of 0.54 km^{2} (0.21 sq mi), it had a population density of 155.6/km^{2} (402.9/sq mi) in 2016.

== See also ==
- List of villages in Saskatchewan
