= Division No. 15, Saskatchewan =

Census division in Canada

Coordinates: 53°12′N 105°45′W

Division No. 15
- Census division in Saskatchewan
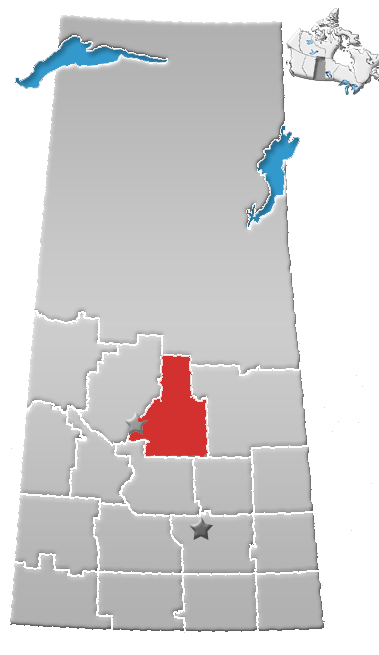
- Country: Canada
- Province: Saskatchewan

Area
  - Total: 19,613.27 km^{2} (7,572.73 sq mi)
- As of 2016

Population (2016)
  - Total: 85,908
  - Density: 4.3801/km^{2} (11.344/sq mi)

Division No. 15 is one of eighteen census divisions in the province of Saskatchewan, Canada, as defined by Statistics Canada. It is located in the north-central part of the province. The most populous community in this division is Prince Albert.

== Demographics ==
In the 2021 Census of Population conducted by Statistics Canada, Division No. 15 had a population of 88,988 living in 33,385 of its 39,512 total private dwellings, a change of 3.6% from its 2016 population of 85,908. With a land area of 19,399.03 km^{2} (7,490.01 sq mi), it had a population density of 4.6/km^{2} (11.9/sq mi) in 2021.

== Census subdivisions ==
The following census subdivisions (municipalities or municipal equivalents) are located within Saskatchewan's Division No. 15.

=== Cities ===
- Humboldt
- Prince Albert
- Melfort

=== Towns ===
- Aberdeen
- Birch Hills
- Bruno
- Cudworth
- Duck Lake
- Hague
- Kinistino
- Rosthern
- St. Brieux
- Vonda
- Wakaw
- Waldheim

=== Villages ===
- Albertville
- Alvena
- Annaheim
- Beatty
- Christopher Lake
- Englefeld
- Hepburn
- Laird
- Lake Lenore
- Meath Park
- Middle Lake
- Muenster
- Paddockwood
- Pilger
- Prud'Homme
- St. Benedict
- St. Gregor
- St. Louis
- Weirdale
- Weldon

=== Resort villages ===
- Candle Lake
- Wakaw Lake

=== Rural municipalities ===
- RM No. 369 St. Peter
- RM No. 370 Humboldt
- RM No. 371 Bayne
- RM No. 372 Grant
- RM No. 373 Aberdeen
- RM No. 399 Lake Lenore
- RM No. 400 Three Lakes
- RM No. 401 Hoodoo
- RM No. 402 Fish Creek
- RM No. 403 Rosthern
- RM No. 404 Laird
- RM No. 429 Flett's Springs
- RM No. 430 Invergordon
- RM No. 431 St. Louis
- RM No. 459 Kinistino
- RM No. 460 Birch Hills
- RM No. 461 Prince Albert
- RM No. 463 Duck Lake
- RM No. 490 Garden River
- RM No. 491 Buckland
- RM No. 520 Paddockwood
- RM No. 521 Lakeland

=== Indian reserves ===
- Beardy's 97 and Okemasis 96
- Beardy's and Okemasis 96 & 97-B
- Chief Joseph Custer
- Cumberland 100A
- James Smith 100
- Little Red River 106C
- Montreal Lake 106B
- Muskoday Reserve
- One Arrow 95
- One Arrow 95-1A
- One Arrow 95-1C
- One Arrow 95-1D
- Wahpaton 94A

== See also ==
- List of census divisions of Saskatchewan
- List of communities in Saskatchewan
