= Bruno, Saskatchewan =

Town in Saskatchewan, Canada

Bruno
- Town
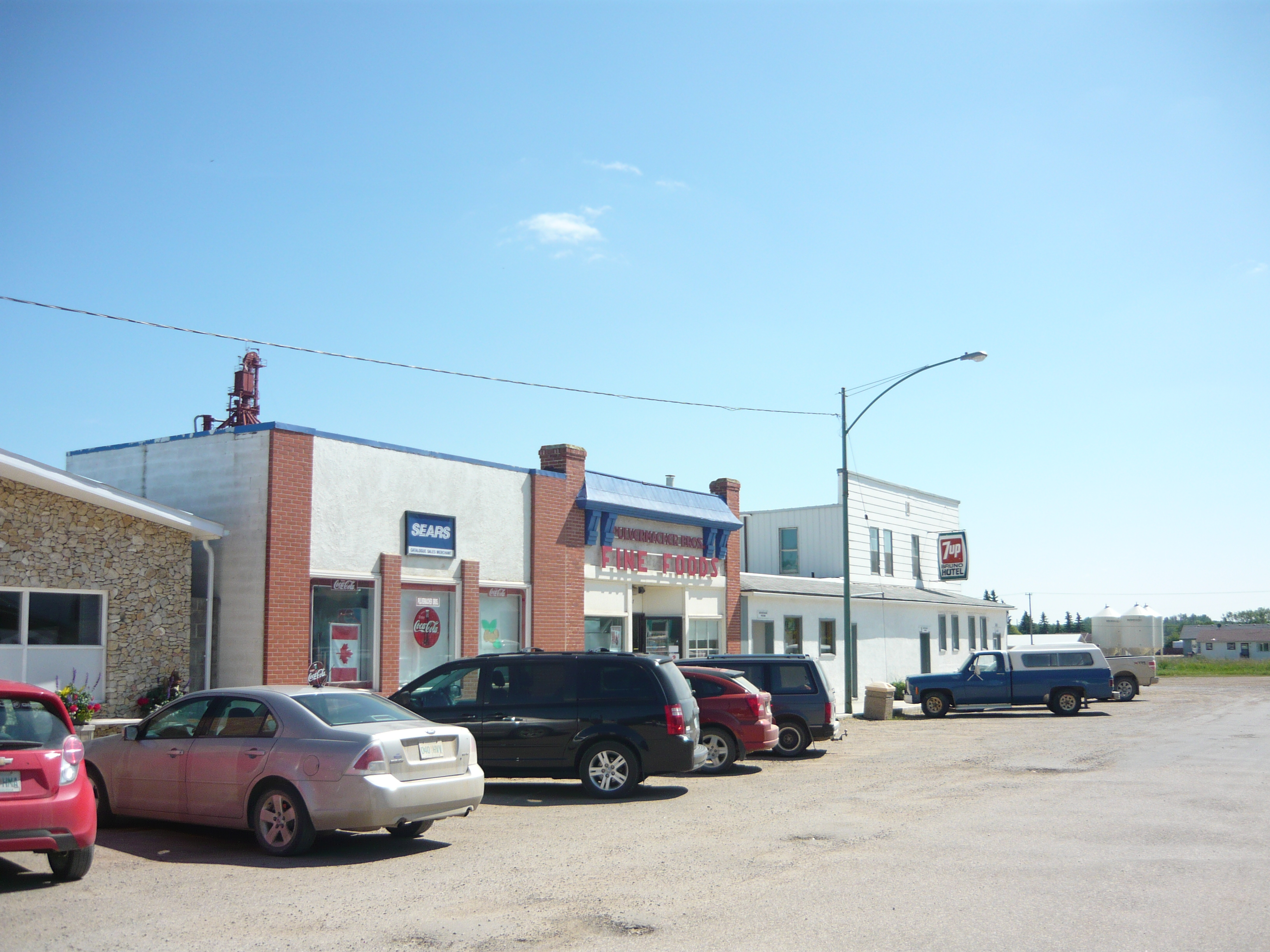
- Main Street

- Location of Bruno in Saskatchewan Bruno (Canada)
- Coordinates: 52.264°N 105.521°W
- Country: Canada
- Province: Saskatchewan
- Census division: No. 15
- Rural municipality: Bayne No. 371
- Post office Founded: 1906

Government
  - Mayor: Dale Glessman
  - MLA Humboldt: Donna Harpauer
  - MP Saskatoon—Humboldt: Brad Trost

Area
  - Land: 0.95 km^{2} (0.37 sq mi)

Population (2011)
  - Total: 574
  - Density: 606.1/km^{2} (1,570/sq mi)
- Time zone: CST
- Postal code: S0K 0S0
- Area code: 306

Bruno is a town located 90 km east of Saskatoon and 35 km west of Humboldt in Saskatchewan, Canada. Its current mayor is Dale Glessman.

Bruno is the only community in the prairies to hold an annual cherry festival.

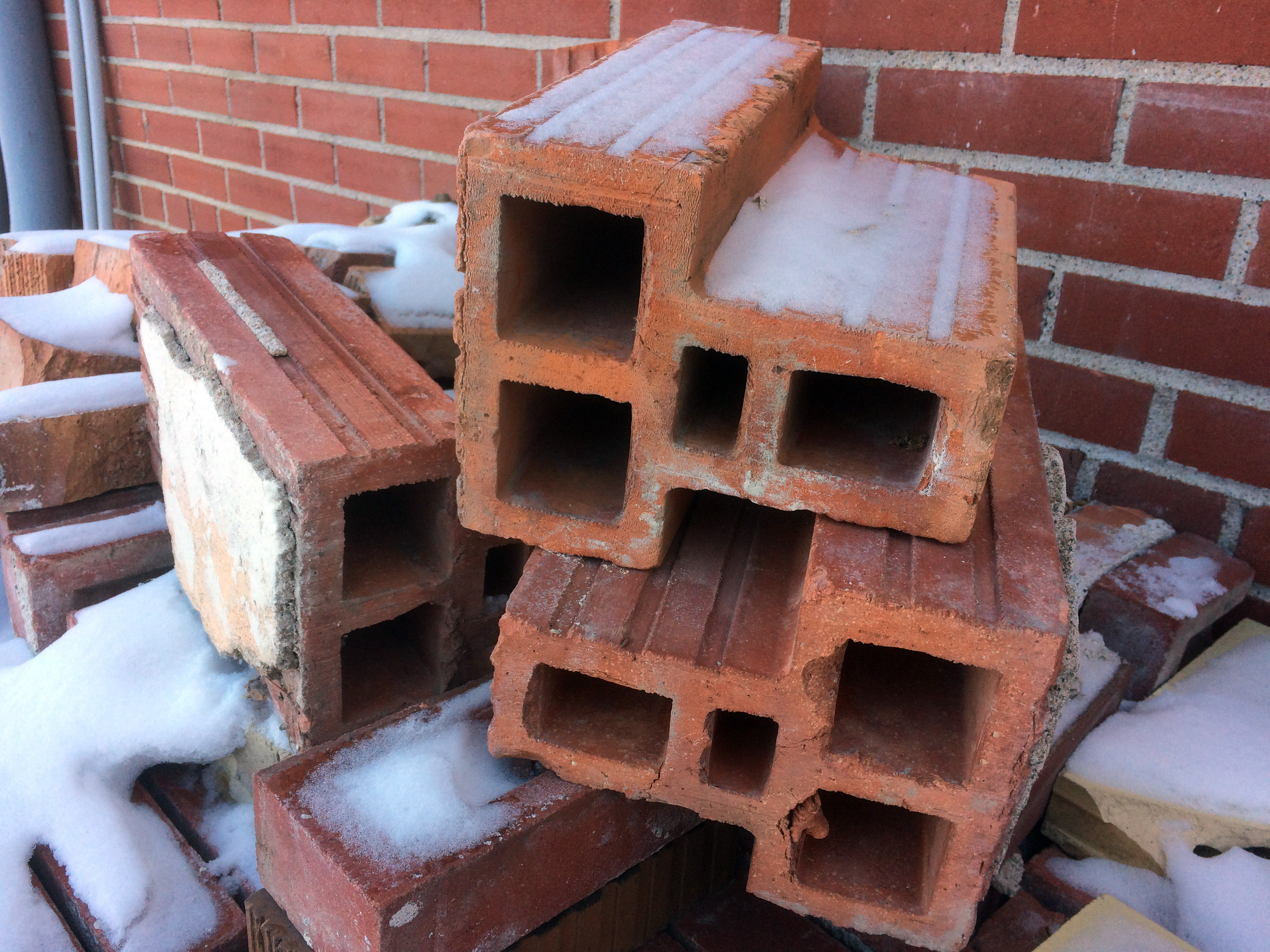
Sample of Bruno Clayworks "T" bricks, manufactured at the old clayworks located 4 km west of Bruno. The clayworks operated between 1905 and the 1960s, and produced a unique sideways "T" shape brick that interlocked when stacked with each row rotated 180º to the previous. The bricks photographed were removed during a room renovation within the 1919 portion of the former St. Ursula's Academy / Ursulines of Bruno Convent (now St. Therese Institute of Faith and Mission).

Bruno Clayworks, located 4 km west of Bruno, produced over one million bricks between 1905 and the 1960s. The historic Old Fire Hall and Jail, a heritage building housing the Bruno Museum, was built from bricks manufactured at the brick plant, as were many other area buildings. The bricks manufactured by the Bruno Clayworks were a unique sideways "T" shape which allowed rows of bricks to interlock when rotated 180º.

== History ==
Bruno was named after Father Bruno Doerfler, who came to the area along with other Germans from Minnesota in 1902.

From 1911 to 1919 Bruno Doefler was Abbot of the Territorial Abbey of Saint Peter-Muenster. The territory of the Territorial abbey (Abbey Nullius) which included Bruno was also referred to as St. Peter's Colony.

=== Ursuline Convent ===
In 1919 the Ursuline Sisters opened a convent and in 1922 an academy called St. Ursula's Academy was established. The convent and academy building of 1919 was expanded in the 1950s with an extension which included the chapel. In 1952 there were 80 professed sisters, up from 55 in 1934. Additional building expansions happened in 1962 (gymnasium) and 1977 (convent infirmary wing). The academy graduated its last class in 1982.

Eight stained glass windows from the convent chapel have been moved to the Holy Spirit Church in Saskatoon, Vanier Collegiate in Moose Jaw, and Villa Angela and the Humboldt Museum (Note: The Natural History Museum of Berlin, in Germany, has been popularly known for 60 years as the "Humboldt Museum" (from 1949 to 2009). This other Museum in Saskatchewan, Canada, has nothing to do with the German museum located in Berlin.) in nearby Humboldt.

=== St. Therese Institute of Faith and Mission ===
On July 1, 2007, the Ursuline facility changed ownership and became the home of St. Therese Institute of Faith and Mission, a Catholic post-secondary school of faith formation; and the St. Therese Healing and Growth Center (now no longer operating), a retreat center for personal inner healing based on Catholic and scriptural traditions. St. Therese Institute opened its doors to its inaugural class in September 2007; the Healing and Growth Center operated from 2008 to 2015. St. Therese Institute of Faith and Mission (and from 2007-2008, St. Therese Catholic College of Faith and Mission) is the operating name of St. Therese School of Faith and Mission Inc. It is a Canadian registered charitable organization.

== Demographics ==
In the 2021 Census of Population conducted by Statistics Canada, Bruno had a population of 604 living in 274 of its 299 total private dwellings, a change of −1.1% from its 2016 population of 611. With a land area of 0.94 km^{2} (0.36 sq mi), it had a population density of 642.6/km^{2} (1,664.2/sq mi) in 2021.

Canada census – Bruno community profile

| | 2021 | 2011 |
| Population | 604 (-1.1% from 2016) | 574 (+16% from 2006) |
| Land area | 0.94 km^{2} (0.36 sq mi) | 0.95 km^{2} (0.37 sq mi) |
| Population density | 643/km^{2} (1,670/sq mi) | 606.1/km^{2} (1,570/sq mi) |
| Median age | 49.2 (M: 50.0, F: 48.4) | 49.9 (M: 49.6, F: 49.9) |
| Private dwellings | 299 (total) 274 (occupied) | 294 (total) |
| Median household income | $58,000 |

References: 2021 2011

== See also ==
- List of communities in Saskatchewan
- List of francophone communities in Saskatchewan
- List of towns in Saskatchewan
