= Marysburg =

Community in Saskatchewan, Canada

- Hamlet
- Location within Saskatchewan Location within Canada
- Coordinates: 52.316749528°N 105.084387467°W
- Country: Canada
- Province: Saskatchewan
- Region: Central
- Rural municipality: Humboldt No. 370
- Post office: 1904-01-01 (closed 1970-08-14)
- Time zone: CST
- Area code: 306

Marysburg is a hamlet in Saskatchewan located along Highway 756. The hamlet is an un-incorporated place within the Rural Municipality of Humboldt No. 370. It is about 16 kilometres (9.9 mi) north of Humboldt.

== History ==
From January 1, 1904 until May 1, 1924 it was referred to as Dead Moose Lake.

== Attractions ==
The hamlet is home to one municipal heritage property, the Marysburg Assumption Church, originally built in 1921 the brick-clad church is of a Romanesque Revival style featuring two towers. The church can hold nearly 400 people and makes extensive use of stained glass. Thirty two paintings by the artist Berthold Imhoff were purchased in 1948 to decorate the church. The church building hosts the Marysburg Summer Festival of the Arts.

A program to restore the historic church is in progress.

A sculpture in the village called The Watching Woman was completed in 2004.

== Sports ==
Marysburg is home to the Marysburg Royals Senior Baseball team that was established in 1918. The team played in the North Central Baseball League from 1965 to 2003. Currently, it plays in the Saskatoon Senior Baseball League. It has celebrated many championships over the years.
