= Englefeld, Saskatchewan =

Village in Saskatchewan, Canada

Englefeld
- Village
- Village of Englefeld
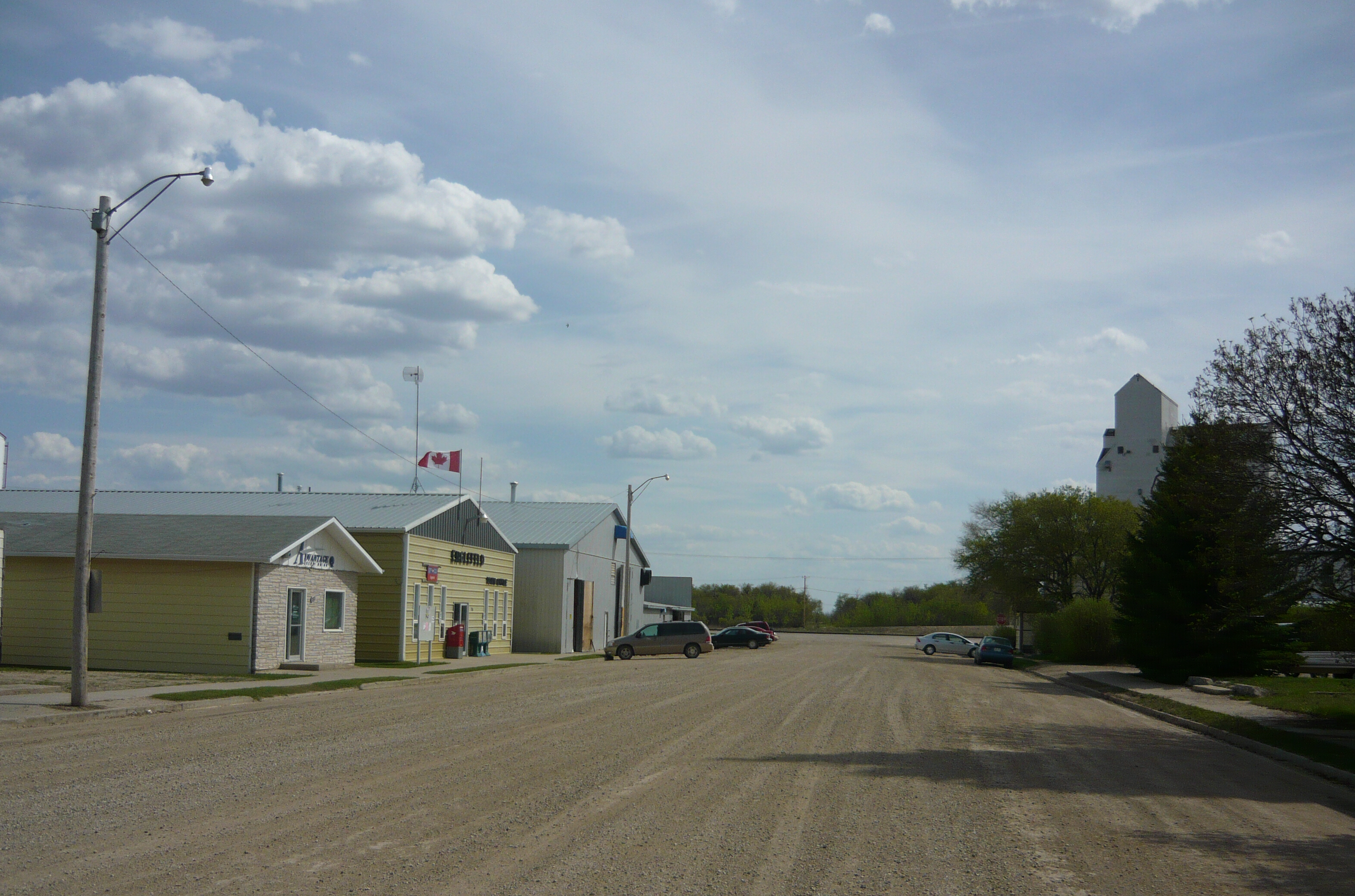
- Main Street, Englefeld

- Location of Englefeld in Saskatchewan Englefeld (Canada)
- Coordinates: 52°09′40″N 104°39′13″W
- Country: Canada
- Province: Saskatchewan
- Region: Central
- Census division: 15
- Rural municipality: St. Peter No. 369
- Post office Founded: February 1, 1907
- Incorporated (Village): June 13, 1916

Government
  - Type: Municipal
  - Governing body: Englefeld Village Council
  - Mayor: Darrell Athmer
  - Administrator: Lani Rae Best

Area
  - Total: 0.65 km^{2} (0.25 sq mi)

Population (2016)
  - Total: 285
  - Density: 439.3/km^{2} (1,138/sq mi)
- Time zone: UTC-6 (CST)
- Postal code: S0K 1N0
- Area codes: 306 / 639
- Highways: Highway 5
- Railways: Canadian National Railway
- Website: Village of Englefeld

Englefeld (2016 population: 285) is a village in the Canadian province of Saskatchewan within the Rural Municipality of St. Peter No. 369 and Census Division No. 15. The village is located 32 kilometres east of the city of Humboldt on Highway 5.

== History ==
The community was named for Peter Engel, an abbot of Saint John's Abbey, located in Collegeville, Minnesota. It is not known why Engel's name was spelled differently in the village's name.

The surrounding area was settled by German Catholic immigrants in 1902–1903 who arrived by train at Rosthern. From there travelled 125 miles by horse to the area around Englefeld. Englefeld was one of several communities within the tract known as St. Peter's Colony. By 1904, the Canadian Northern Railway had made its way through the region, as did the telegraph with the telephone eventually arriving in 1916. In 1905, the first church was erected, followed by a general store and lumberyard in 1906 and a post office in February 1907. A hotel was erected in 1909 and the Englefeld school district was formed. The first grain elevator in the community went up in 1910 with a railway station following in 1912. In 1910 the first fully graded roads were constructed in the community and that same year a livery barn was constructed. A community hall was constructed in 1912 and electric lighting made its debut in the community in 1915.

Englefeld incorporated as a village on June 13, 1916.

== Demographics ==
Population history (1981–2016)
Year	Pop.	±%
1981	271	—
1986	249	−8.1%
1991	219	−12.0%
1996	223	+1.8%
2001	245	+9.9%
2006	227	−7.3%
2011	247	+8.8%
2016	285	+15.4%
Source: Statistics Canada via Saskatchewan Bureau of Statistics

In the 2021 Census of Population conducted by Statistics Canada, Englefeld had a population of 259 living in 105 of its 114 total private dwellings, a change of −9.1% from its 2016 population of 285. With a land area of 0.66 km^{2} (0.25 sq mi), it had a population density of 392.4/km^{2} (1,016.4/sq mi) in 2021.

In the 2016 Census of Population, the Village of Englefeld recorded a population of 285 living in 107 of its 117 total private dwellings, a 13.3% change from its 2011 population of 247. With a land area of 0.65 km^{2} (0.25 sq mi), it had a population density of 438.5/km^{2} (1,135.6/sq mi) in 2016.

== Arts and culture ==
Hog Fest — The Englefeld Hog Fest was originally organized by Father Florian Renneberg in 1972. The 40th annual fundraising event brought in 1,270 people over July long weekend (July 1–3, 2011) which included Canada Day fireworks, carnival/farmers market festivities, culminating in a feast with 16 smoked pigs, and closing out with a pancake breakfast. As part of the 25th Hog Fest (celebrated in 1996) a 7 ft tall (17 ft long) fiberglass pig was erected on top of the Koenders Manufacturing building located in Englefeld along Highway 5.

== Gallery ==
Welcome sign outside of Englefeld

Hogfest in Englefeld

Three Little Pigs' House in Englefeld

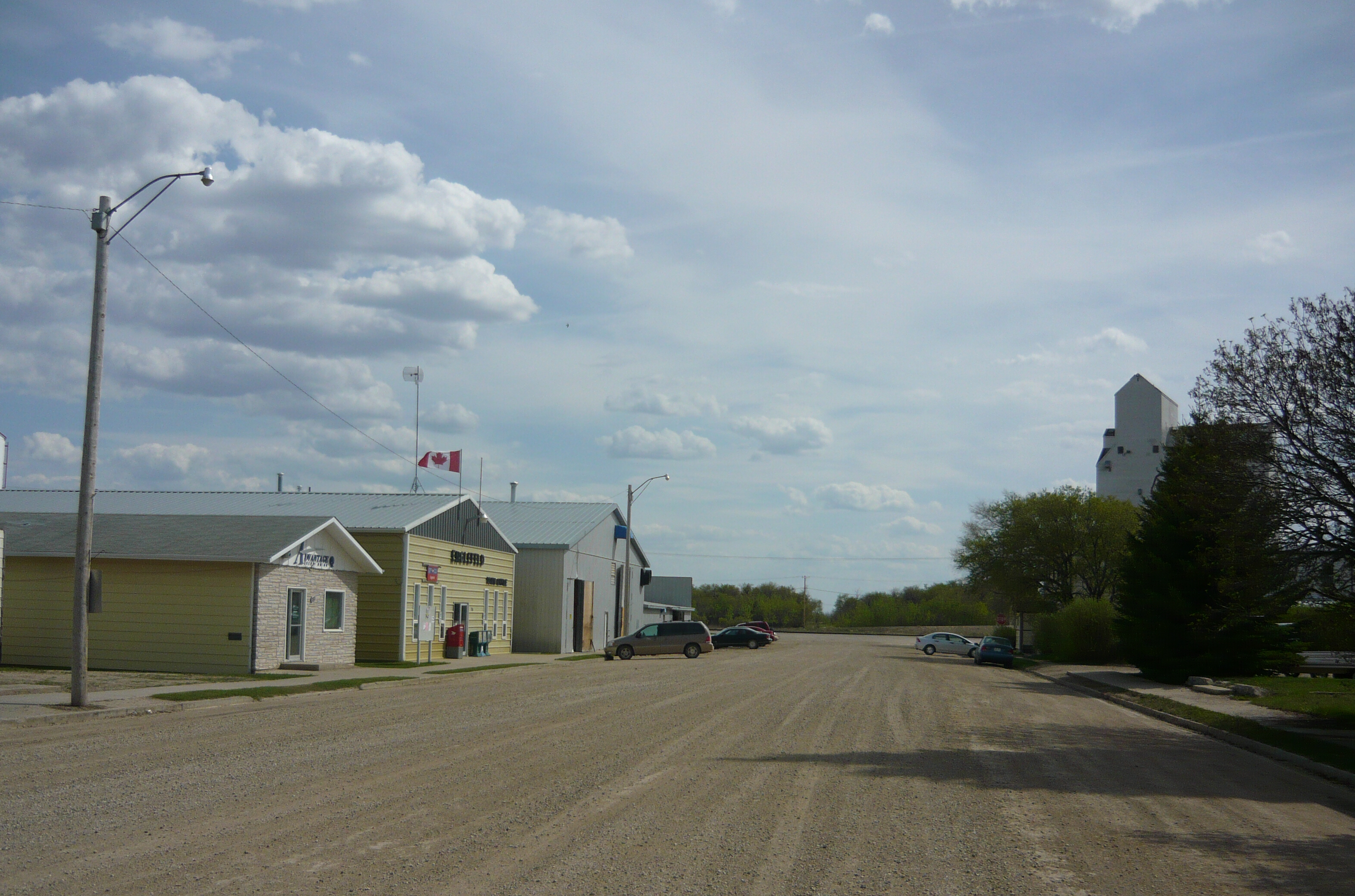
Downtown Englefeld

== See also ==
- List of communities in Saskatchewan
- List of villages in Saskatchewan
