= Peterson, Saskatchewan =

Community in Saskatchewan, Canada

Peterson
- Hamlet
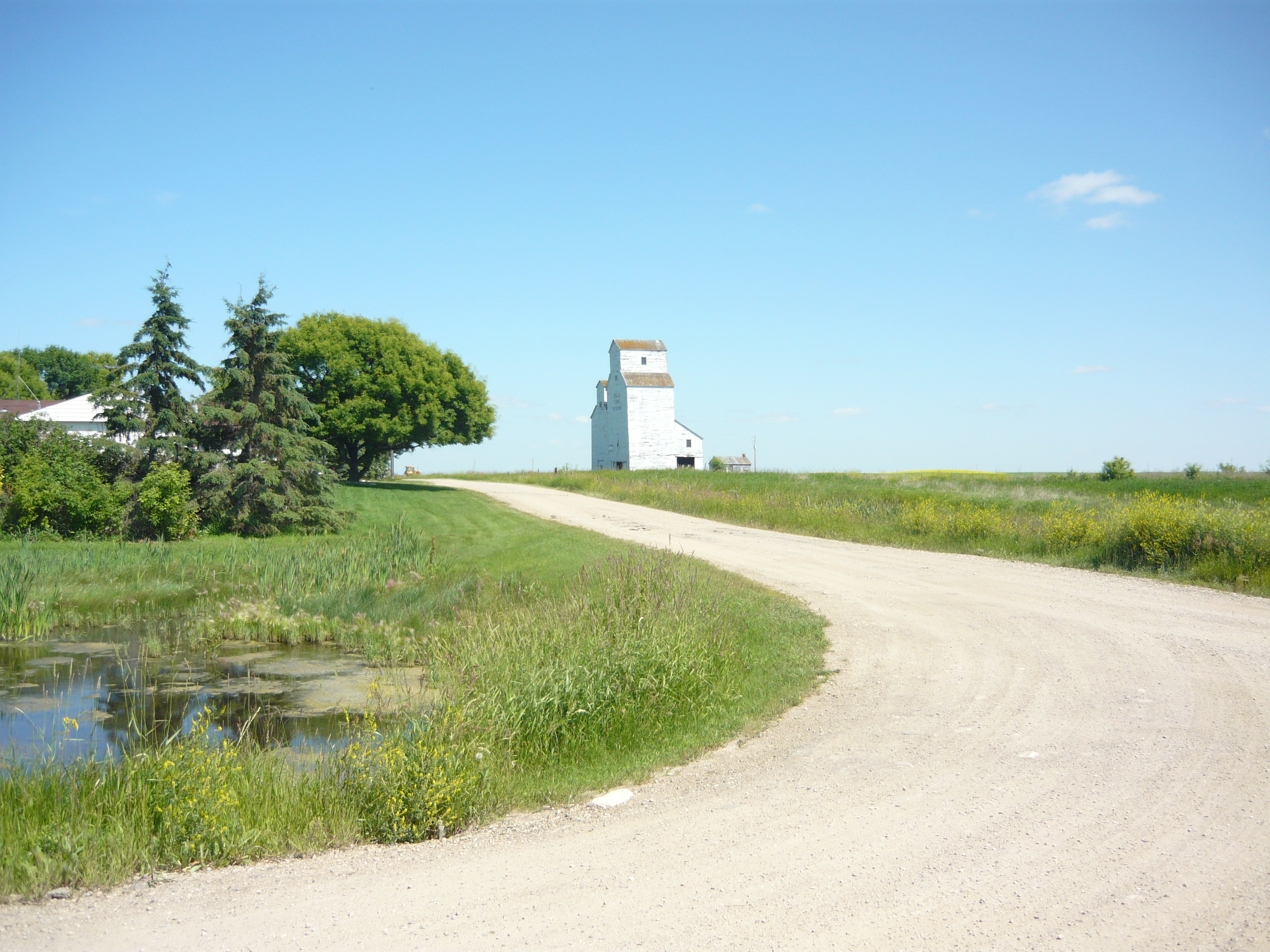
- Railway Avenue

- Location of Peterson in Saskatchewan
- Coordinates: 52°11′32.84″N 105°41′16.97″W
- Country: Canada
- Province: Saskatchewan
- Census division: 15

Peterson is a hamlet located on Highway 5 in the Rural Municipality of Bayne No. 371. The village was founded when the railway was built in 1911–12.

It is considered a ghost town by some because of the many empty and deteriorating buildings in what once was a more populous farming community with two churches, a grain elevator and several businesses. The Junction of Highway 5 and Highway 2 Yet in the village, St. Agnes Catholic Church continues to have services every Sunday. The Community Hall was torn down in December 2012, and the grounds are maintained in the St. Agnes Ukrainian Catholic and Roman Catholic Cemetery.

== See also ==
- List of communities in Saskatchewan
