= Humboldt, Saskatchewan =

City in Saskatchewan, Canada

Humboldt
- City
- City of Humboldt
- Aerial view of downtown (2025)

- Location within Saskatchewan Location within Canada
- Coordinates: 52°12′07″N 105°07′23″W
- Country: Canada
- Province: Saskatchewan
- Established: 1875
- Incorporated (town): April 1, 1907
- Incorporated (city): November 7, 2000

Government
  - Mayor: Rob Muench (2024)
  - Humboldt City Council: Larry Jorgenson; Sarah McInnis; Dave Rowe; Marilyn Scott; Roger Korte; Karen Siermachesky
  - MLA, Humboldt-Watrous: Racquel Hilbert (SKP)
  - MP, Carlton Trail—Eagle Creek: Kelly Block (CPC)

Area
  - Total: 11.66 km^{2} (4.50 sq mi)
  - Land: 2.73 km^{2} (1.05 sq mi)
- Elevation: 548.60 m (1,799.9 ft)

Population (2021)
  - Total: 6,033
  - Density: 2,210/km^{2} (5,720/sq mi)
- Time zone: UTC-6 (CST)
- Postal code: S0K 2A0
- Area code: 306
- Highways: Highway 5 / Highway 20
- Railways: Canadian National
- Website: www.humboldt.ca

Humboldt is a city in the province of Saskatchewan, Canada. It is located 113 km east of Saskatoon at the junction of Highway 5 and Highway 20. The city is surrounded by the Rural Municipality of Humboldt No. 370.

== History ==
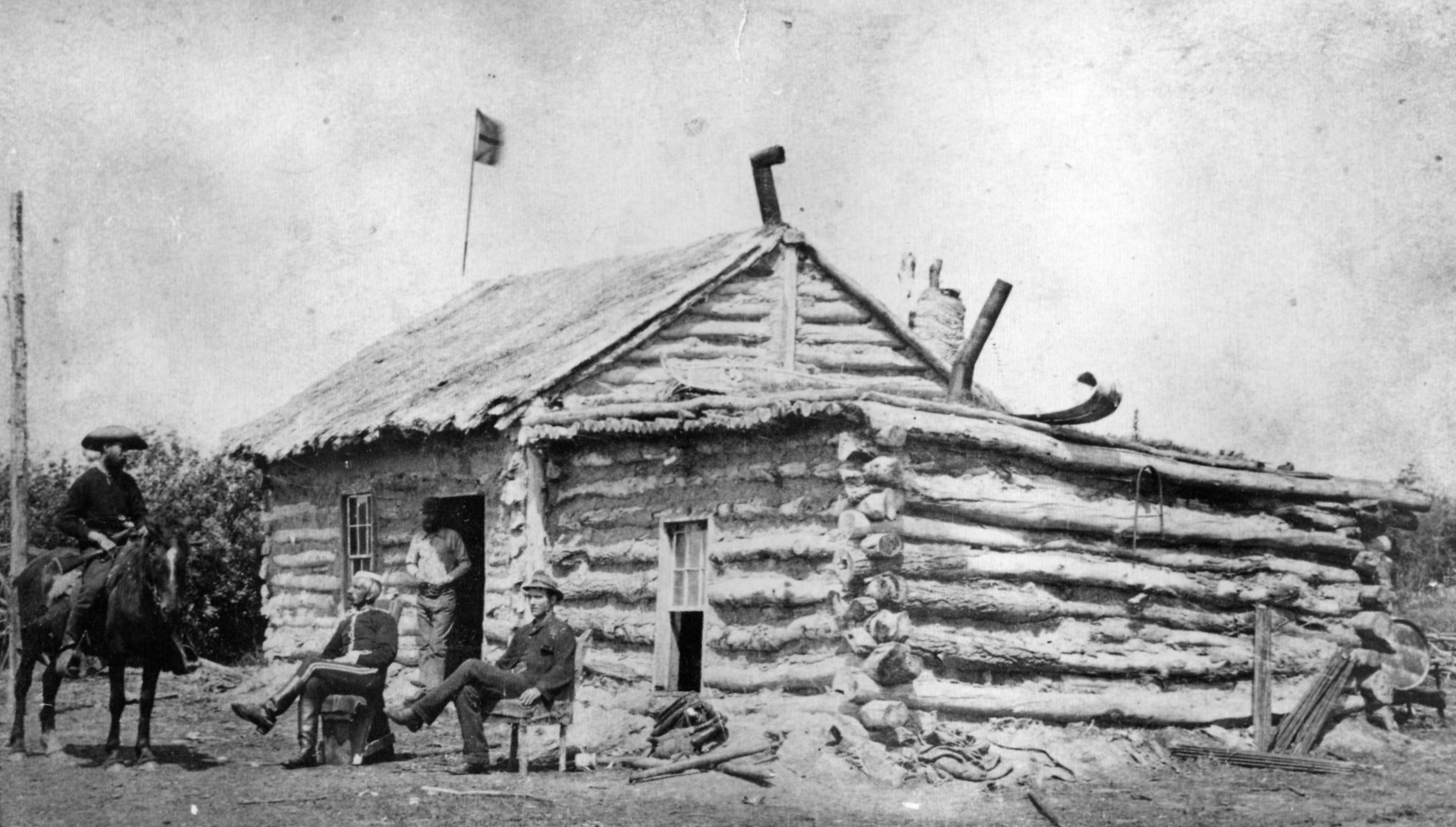
Humboldt telegraph station (circa 1885)

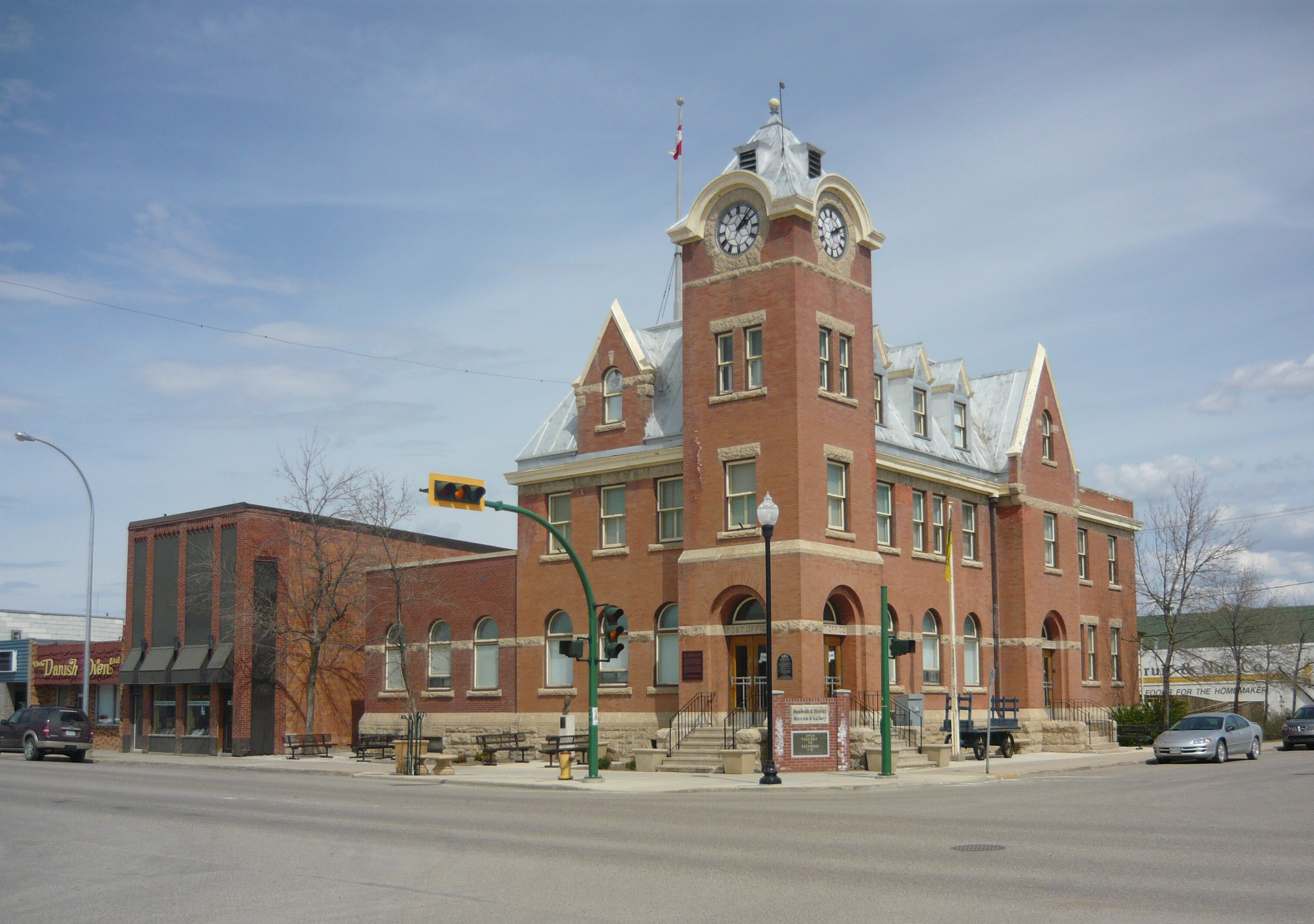
Humboldt Post Office, which is now home of the Humboldt & District Museum

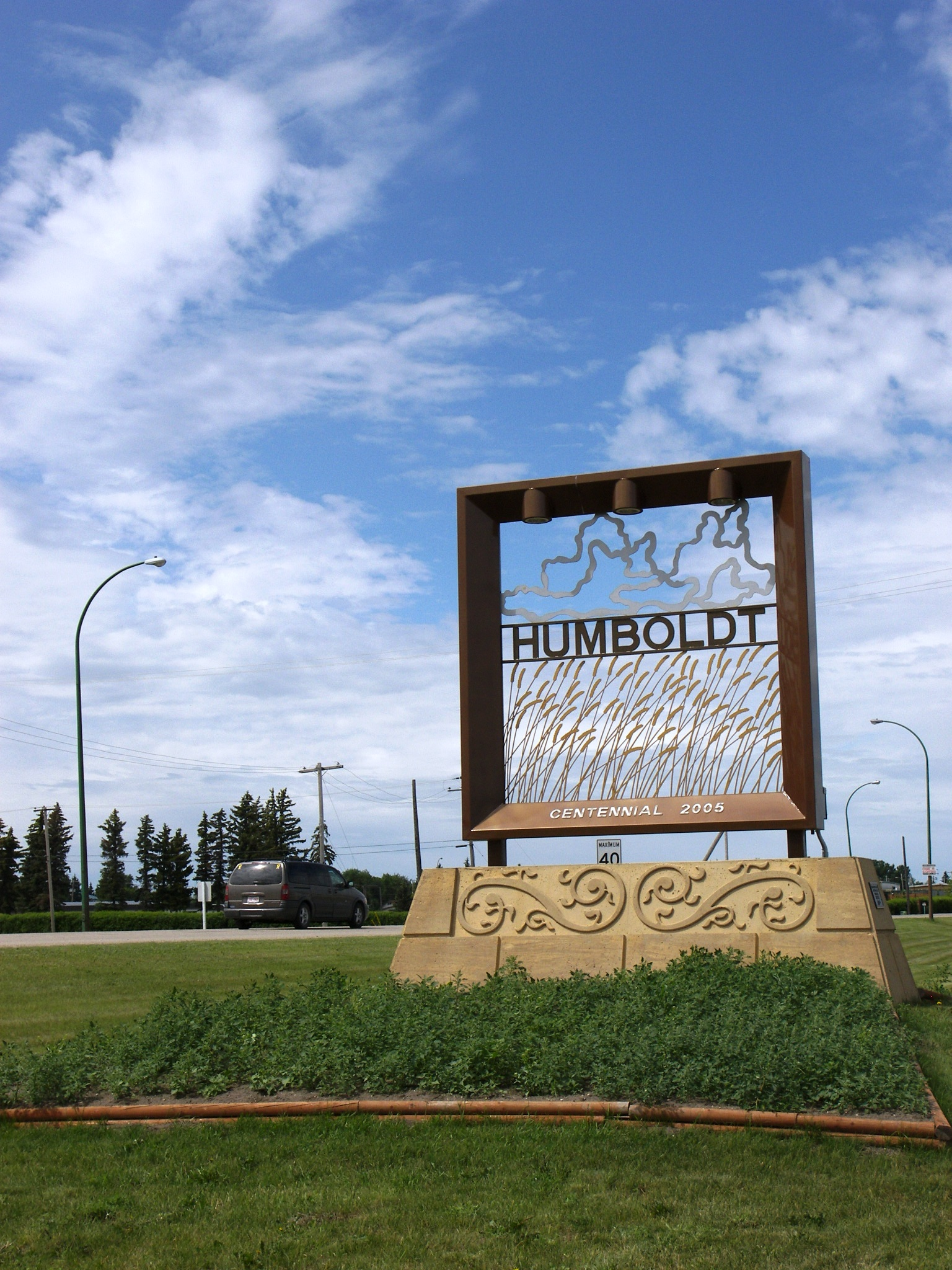
Welcome sign

Named after German explorer Alexander von Humboldt, Humboldt began as a telegraph station located on the Carlton Trail, a wagon route used in the early days of western Canada as a route from Fort Garry (Winnipeg) to Fort Edmonton. The name "Humboldt" was approved in 1875 for a site in the North-West Territories along the Canadian Pacific Telegraph Line at which a repair station was built (8 km south-west of the present city site). Built in 1878, the Humboldt telegraph station played an integral part in communications for the developing West.

With the Métis uprising led by Louis Riel taking place at Batoche just 100 km northwest, Humboldt became an important communication link between Prime Minister John A. Macdonald and his forces in the West, thus a site of strategic significance. General Frederick Middleton arrived in April 1885 with 950 soldiers, established a garrison at the station, and used it as his base for scouting operations. At that time, the Humboldt station was crucial, since the telegraph line further west was periodically cut – so Humboldt was the last secure link to the East.

On May 1, 1885, Humboldt became the site of a large supply depot under Lieutenant-Colonel George Taylor Denison III of the Governor General's Body Guard. A combined force of approximately 460 men built an elaborate series of entrenchments, converting the station into a fortified military encampment to protect the supplies. The troops left Humboldt in July 1885. The area was also the site of the first stagecoach robbery in Western Canada. Parts of the Carlton Trail in the form of wagon tracks/ruts still exist in the Humboldt area.

Humboldt in its beginnings was primarily German Catholic. It became the largest settlement in the Territorial Abbey of Saint Peter-Muenster also called St. Peter's Colony established by Benedictine monks from St John's Abbey in Collegeville, Minnesota. Immigration to the area from both the Northern Plains states of the US and Germany was promoted by the German American Land Company. Many immigrants from the German Empire settled in areas in and around Humboldt such as Muenster, Fulda, Pilger, St Gregor and Englefeld. Immigrants from the Russian Empire who were ethnic Germans settled in the area west of Humboldt and south of the hamlet of Carmel.

After being established as a community, Humboldt became an important location in Saskatchewan previously known as the "Heart of the Sure Crop District" for its reliable growing weather, which led the town to become a centre for farming equipment and supply businesses.

=== Humboldt Broncos bus crash ===
On April 6, 2018, the Humboldt Broncos junior hockey team was involved in a serious bus crash. The bus was carrying the team to a playoff game in Nipawin, Saskatchewan, when it collided with a tractor trailer loaded with peat moss at an intersection known as Armley Corner, near Nipawin. Sixteen of the 30 people on board the bus died — the driver, the general manager/head coach, the assistant coach, a radio commentator, a volunteer, the club's female trainer, and 10 players between the ages of 16 and 21. Fourteen players were injured, several of them seriously. News of the crash received significant national and international media coverage, and numerous dignitaries and politicians sent their condolences to the team and city. Two days after the crash, a vigil was held at the Elgar Petersen Arena in Humboldt, which was attended by over 5,000 people and televised nationally. Attendees included Prime Minister Justin Trudeau, the Premier of Saskatchewan, and popular Canadian sports personalities Don Cherry and Ron MacLean. Humboldt Mayor Rob Muench called the tragedy a "truly dark moment" for the city.

== Climate ==
Humboldt experiences a humid continental climate (Köppen climate classification Dfb) featuring long, cold winters and brief, warm summers. The region falls into the USDA Plant Hardiness Zone 3a. It is a great distance from any large bodies of water, and thus lacks any moderating influences on its climate. The latitudinal difference of Saskatchewan can typically explain a 6–8 °C difference mean in annual temperatures across the province.

The highest temperature ever recorded in Humboldt was 41.1 °C (106 °F) on 19 July 1941. The coldest temperature ever recorded was −50.6 °C (−59 °F) on 12 January 1916.

Climate data for Humboldt
| Month | Jan | Feb | Mar | Apr | May | Jun | Jul | Aug | Sep | Oct | Nov | Dec | Year |
|---|---|---|---|---|---|---|---|---|---|---|---|---|---|
| Record high °C (°F) | 6.0 (42.8) | 15.0 (59.0) | 20.6 (69.1) | 32.2 (90.0) | 36.0 (96.8) | 39.0 (102.2) | 41.1 (106.0) | 38.3 (100.9) | 34.4 (93.9) | 31.1 (88.0) | 21.1 (70.0) | 10.0 (50.0) | 41.1 (106.0) |
| Mean daily maximum °C (°F) | −11.9 (10.6) | −8.3 (17.1) | −1.9 (28.6) | 9.1 (48.4) | 17.2 (63.0) | 21.4 (70.5) | 23.9 (75.0) | 23.8 (74.8) | 17.1 (62.8) | 9.0 (48.2) | −2.5 (27.5) | −9.8 (14.4) | 7.3 (45.1) |
| Daily mean °C (°F) | −16.9 (1.6) | −13.3 (8.1) | −6.6 (20.1) | 3.3 (37.9) | 10.4 (50.7) | 15.2 (59.4) | 17.4 (63.3) | 16.9 (62.4) | 10.8 (51.4) | 3.5 (38.3) | −6.8 (19.8) | −14.3 (6.3) | 1.6 (34.9) |
| Mean daily minimum °C (°F) | −21.8 (−7.2) | −18.1 (−0.6) | −11.3 (11.7) | −2.5 (27.5) | 3.6 (38.5) | 8.9 (48.0) | 10.9 (51.6) | 10.1 (50.2) | 4.4 (39.9) | −2.1 (28.2) | −11.1 (12.0) | −18.8 (−1.8) | −4.0 (24.8) |
| Record low °C (°F) | −50.6 (−59.1) | −46.7 (−52.1) | −46.1 (−51.0) | −33.0 (−27.4) | −16.7 (1.9) | −10.0 (14.0) | −4.4 (24.1) | −6.7 (19.9) | −12.2 (10.0) | −24.0 (−11.2) | −36.5 (−33.7) | −43.9 (−47.0) | −50.6 (−59.1) |
| Average precipitation mm (inches) | 15.1 (0.59) | 9.0 (0.35) | 15.1 (0.59) | 23.3 (0.92) | 43.2 (1.70) | 67.6 (2.66) | 82.2 (3.24) | 51.0 (2.01) | 37.2 (1.46) | 22.5 (0.89) | 12.1 (0.48) | 14.4 (0.57) | 392.5 (15.45) |
Source: Environment Canada

== Demographics ==
In the 2021 Census of Population conducted by Statistics Canada, Humboldt had a population of 6,033 living in 2,494 of its 2,707 total private dwellings, a change of 2.8% from its 2016 population of 5,869. With a land area of 13.3 km^{2} (5.1 sq mi), it had a population density of 453.6/km^{2} (1,174.8/sq mi) in 2021.

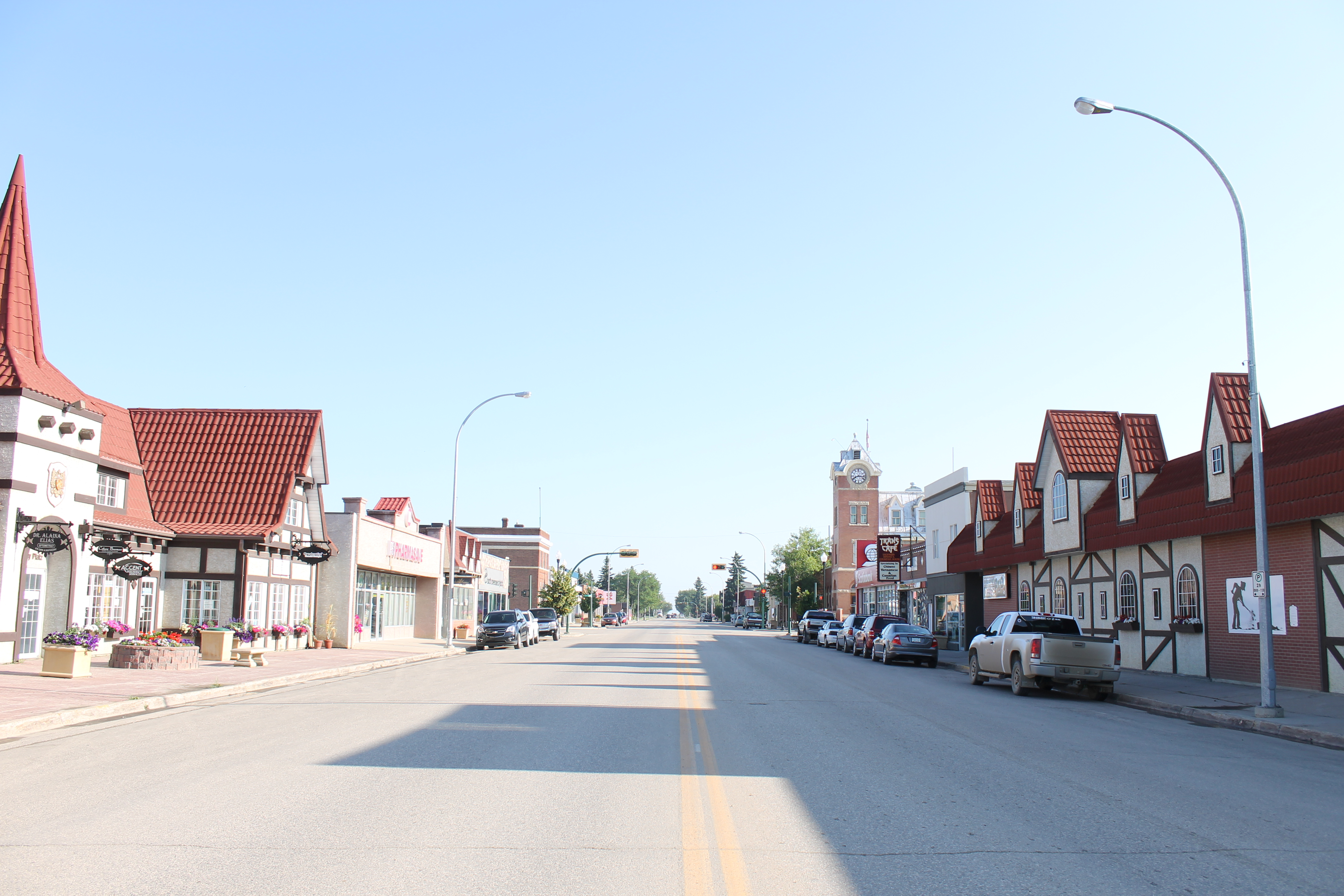
Humboldt's historic downtown

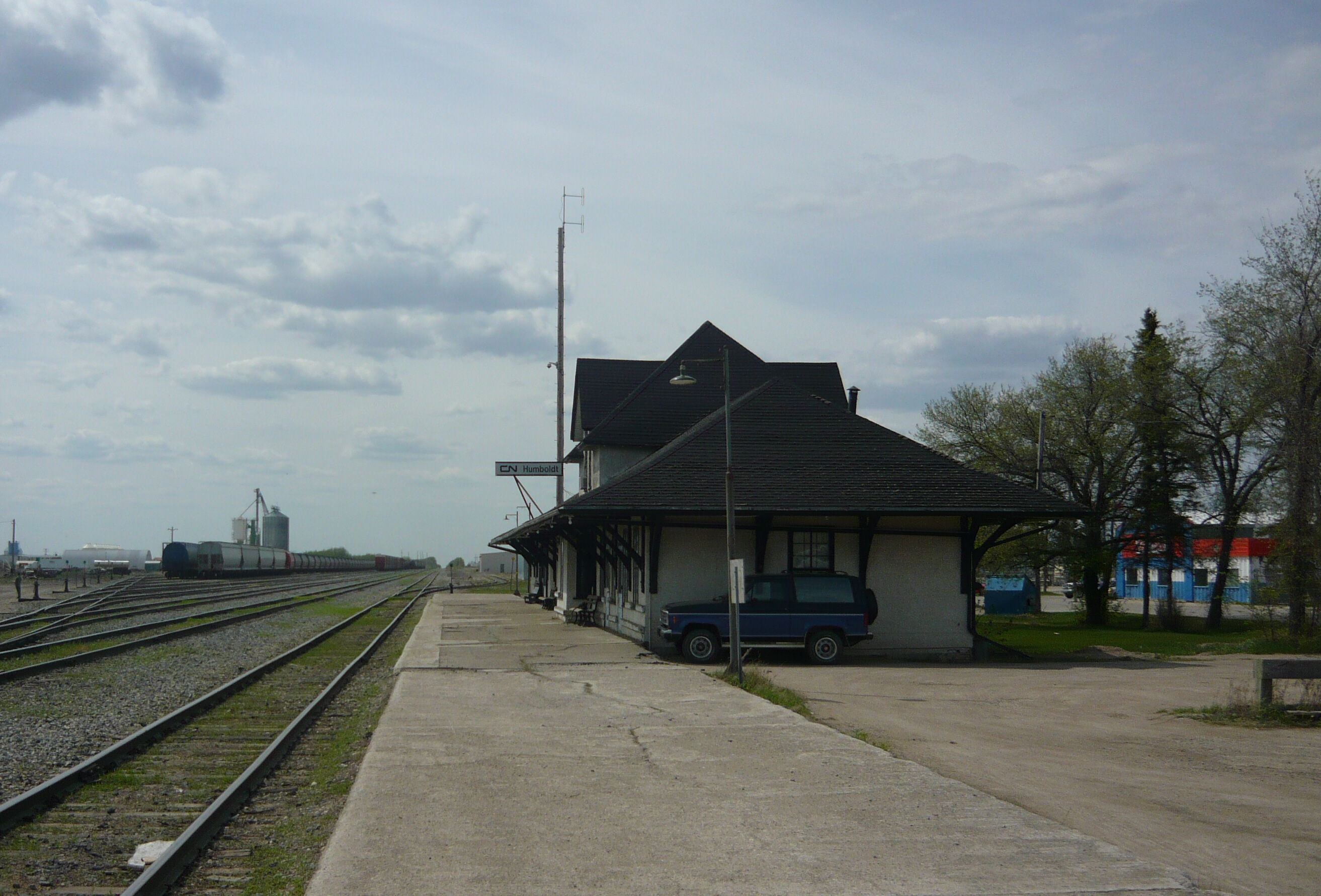
Humboldt station

Canada census – Humboldt community profile

| | 2021 | 2016 | 2011 |
| Population | 6,033 (+2.8% from 2016) | 5,869 (+3.4% from 2011) | 5,678 (+13.6% from 2006) |
| Land area | 13.30 km^{2} (5.14 sq mi) | 13.47 km^{2} (5.20 sq mi) | 13.46 km^{2} (5.20 sq mi) |
| Population density | 453.5/km^{2} (1,175/sq mi) | 435.7/km^{2} (1,128/sq mi) | 421.9/km^{2} (1,093/sq mi) |
| Median age | 43.6 (M: 41.2, F: 45.6) | 44.4 (M: 41.6, F: 46.7) | 45.2 (M: 42.6, F: 47.1) |
| Private dwellings | 2,707 (total) 2,494 (occupied) | 2,582 (total) | 2,567 (total) |
| Median household income | $80,000 | $71,979 |

References: 2021 2016 2011

Major ethnic groups, 2021
| Ethnic group | Population | Percent |
|---|---|---|
| German | 2790 | 46% |
| English | 925 | 15% |
| Ukrainian | 895 | 14.8% |
| Irish | 525 | 8.7% |
| Canadian | 565 | 9% |
| French | 475 | 7.8% |
| Scottish | 710 | 11.3% |
| Filipino | 450 | 7.4% |
| Other | 1530 | 26% |
| Total respondent population | 5.510 | 100% |

Panethnic groups in the City of Humboldt (2001−2021)
| Panethnic group | 2021 | | 2016 | | 2011 | | 2006 | | 2001 | |
| Panethnic group | Pop. | % | Pop. | % | Pop. | % | Pop. | % | Pop. | % |
|---|---|---|---|---|---|---|---|---|---|---|
| European (Note: Statistic includes all persons that did not make up part of a visible minority or an indigenous identity.) | 4,745 | 81.81% | 4,960 | 87.79% | 5,265 | 95.64% | 4,750 | 97.74% | 4,890 | 97.31% |
| Southeast Asian (Note: Statistic includes total responses of "Filipino" and "Southeast Asian" under visible minority section on census.) | 595 | 10.26% | 265 | 4.69% | 50 | 0.91% | 0 | 0% | 0 | 0% |
| Indigenous | 245 | 4.22% | 310 | 5.49% | 150 | 2.72% | 105 | 2.16% | 75 | 1.49% |
| African | 90 | 1.55% | 75 | 1.33% | 20 | 0.36% | 0 | 0% | 20 | 0.4% |
| South Asian | 50 | 0.86% | 20 | 0.35% | 0 | 0% | 0 | 0% | 0 | 0% |
| East Asian (Note: Statistic includes total responses of "Chinese", "Korean", and "Japanese" under visible minority section on census.) | 30 | 0.52% | 25 | 0.44% | 0 | 0% | 0 | 0% | 20 | 0.4% |
| Latin American | 15 | 0.26% | 0 | 0% | 0 | 0% | 0 | 0% | 10 | 0.2% |
| Middle Eastern (Note: Statistic includes total responses of "West Asian" and "Arab" under visible minority section on census.) | 0 | 0% | 0 | 0% | 0 | 0% | 0 | 0% | 0 | 0% |
| Other/multiracial (Note: Statistic includes total responses of "Visible minority, n.i.e." and "Multiple visible minorities" under visible minority section on census.) | 0 | 0% | 25 | 0.44% | 0 | 0% | 10 | 0.21% | 10 | 0.2% |
| Total responses | 5,800 | 96.14% | 5,650 | 96.27% | 5,505 | 96.95% | 4,860 | 97.24% | 5,025 | 97.36% |
| Total population | 6,033 | 100% | 5,869 | 100% | 5,678 | 100% | 4,998 | 100% | 5,161 | 100% |
Note: Totals greater than 100% due to multiple origin responses

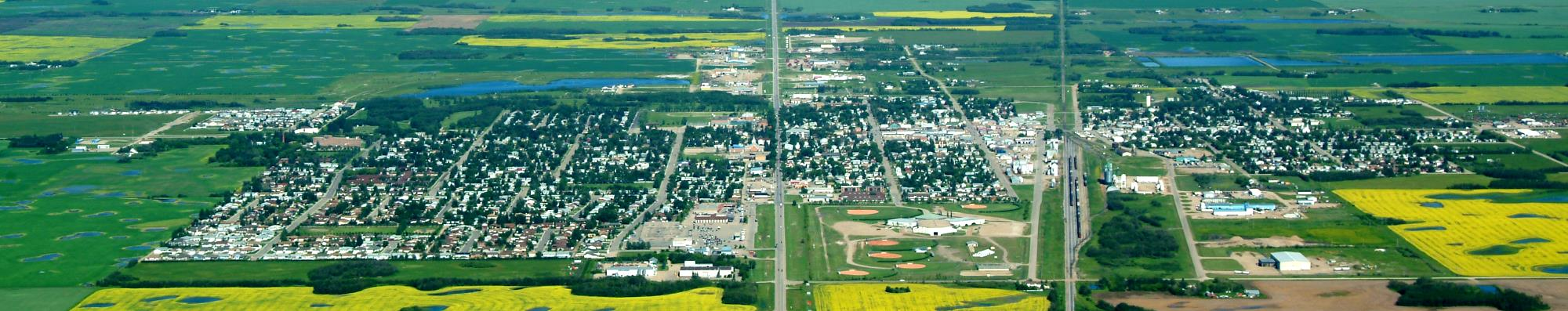
Humboldt aerial view, looking east

== Economy ==
About 95% of all goods produced in the province directly depend on its basic resources (grains, livestock, oil and gas, potash, uranium and timber) and their refined products.

Wheat, canola, flax, peas, rye, lentils, canary seed and barley are mainly grown in the area. Beef cattle production, pork production – as well as other livestock – are significant for the community. With many farmers in the area, agricultural-related businesses were formed. Some services offered are in trucking and financial management, finance, business services, wholesale trade, transportation, etc. Humboldt is in the heart of potash country with many people employed in the mines near the city. The manufacturing community represented in the "Iron Triangle" also employs a large number of people in the city and surrounding district.

== Attractions ==
Humboldt has a number of heritage buildings listed on the Canadian Register of Historic Places. They include the Canadian National Railways (Canadian Northern Railway) Station (built in 1905), a Post Office (built in 1911–1912), the Humboldt Provincial Court House (built in 1914–1920). and the Humboldt Water Tower (built in 1914) has been renovated with a spiral staircase and a circular observation platform on top.

The Humboldt Post Office is a National Historic Site of Canada (built in 1911–1912). It houses the Humboldt and District Museum and Gallery. Across the street is the Humboldt and District Art Gallery in the old Merchant Bank Building.

Marysburg Assumption Church is located 16 km (9.9 mi) north of Humboldt. Mount Carmel Shrine is located 23 km (14 mi) west and St. Peter's Abbey and St. Peter's Cathedral are 10 km (6.2 mi) east of the city in Muenster.

The Humboldt Murals located in the town centre depict historic scenes.

=== Festivals ===
- The Summer Sizzler is held in late-June of each year. The event features a midway, demolition derby, cabaret, slo-pitch tournament, tractor pull, Sizzler Strut Marathon and live on-stage entertainment. On the opening day, there is a parade through downtown and a pancake breakfast at Centennial Park.
- Canada Day celebrations occur every year on July 1 concluding with fireworks at the Uniplex.
- The Humboldt StreetFest is held in mid-August and is organized by the Humboldt Downtown Business Improvement District.

== Churches ==
Humboldt has ten churches: Humboldt Alliance Church, St. John's Lutheran, St. Andrew's Anglican Church, St. Augustine Catholic Church, Living Word Ministries, All Saints Ukrainian Catholic Church, Humboldt Bible Church, Westminster United Church of Canada, First Baptist Church and Kingdom Hall of Jehovah's Witnesses.

== Education ==
Humboldt Collegiate

Location
- 509 8th Avenue; Humboldt, Saskatchewan, S0K 2A1; Canada

Information
- Type: Secondary
- School board: Horizon School Division No. 205; Greater Saskatoon Catholic Schools
- Principal: David Millette
- Vice principal: Heidi Phillips
- Vice principal: Eric Anderson
- Grades: Grade 9 to grade 12
- Enrollment: 431 (2025)
- Education system: Public/Separate
- Language: English
- Website: Humboldt Collegiate Institute

Humboldt Public School

Location
- 509 8th Avenue; Humboldt, Saskatchewan, S0K 2A1; Canada

Information
- Type: Elementary
- School board: Horizon School Division No. 205
- Principal: Paul Strueby
- Vice principal: Jennifer Showers
- Grades: Pre-kindergarten to grade 8
- Enrollment: 327 (2025)
- Education system: Public
- Language: English
- Website: Humboldt Public School

St. Augustine School

Location
- 1103 8th Avenue; Humboldt, Saskatchewan, S0K 2A1; Canada

Information
- Type: Elementary
- Religious affiliation: Catholic
- Opened: 1907
- School board: Greater Saskatoon Catholic Schools
- Principal: Chad Knaus
- Vice principal: Nicole Unrau
- Grades: Kindergarten to grade 8
- Enrollment: 308 (2025)
- Education system: Separate
- Language: English
- Website: St. Augustine School

St. Dominic School

Location
- 706 2nd Avenue South; Humboldt, Saskatchewan, S0K 2A1; Canada

Information
- Type: Elementary
- Religious affiliation: Catholic
- Opened: 1959
- School board: Greater Saskatoon Catholic Schools
- Principal: Monica Corcoran
- Vice principal: Celese LeRay-Leicht
- Grades: Kindergarten to grade 8
- Enrollment: 196 (2025)
- Education system: Separate
- Language: English
- Website: St. Dominic School

Humboldt has three elementary schools: two Catholic (St. Augustine and St. Dominic) and one public (Humboldt Public School).

It has one public high school, Humboldt Collegiate Institute. It is co-managed by Horizon School Division No. 205 and Greater Saskatoon Catholic Schools. The Humboldt Collegiate Institute has senior and junior volleyball teams (boys' and girls'), senior and junior basketball teams (boys' and girls'), soccer (boys' and girls'), badminton, golf, cross-country, track & field and a nine-man football program known as HCI Mohawks. The Mohawks won provincial championships in 1975, 1996, 1997, 2008, and 2010.

Carlton Trail Regional College has its headquarters in Humboldt.

== Infrastructure ==
=== Transportation ===
The city is served by Highway 5 and Highway 20.

Humboldt Airport, (TC LID: CJU4), is located 1 nautical mile (1.9 kilometres; 1.2 miles) south of the city.

Humboldt is serviced by CN Rail and is home to a number of rail workers.

=== Health care ===
Humboldt District Health Complex is home to the Humboldt Hospital and Community Health Services. Humboldt has two medical clinics and four pharmacies in addition to local dental, chiropractic, home care, optometry, physiotherapy as well as health and wellness services.

== Government ==
=== Humboldt City Council ===
The Humboldt City Council is the municipal governing body for the city. The council consists of the mayor and six councillors. The current council sits between 2020 and 2024. The last civic election was held on November 9, 2020. Historically, the mayor and councillors were elected to three-year terms; however, the terms have increased to four years. Michael Behiel was elected as Mayor in 2020, after serving as Councillor from 2016 to 2020. Rob Muench was elected for his first term as Mayor in the 2016 election, and had previously been on City Council for 10 years as Councilor. In 2020, he was elected as Councillor.

=== Legislative Assembly of Saskatchewan ===
The city of Humboldt is the largest centre in the provincial electoral district of Humboldt-Watrous. Racquel Hilbert of the Saskatchewan Party is the current MLA for the riding.

=== Member of Parliament ===
The City of Humboldt is currently within the federal electoral district of Carlton Trail—Eagle Creek which is represented by Kelly Block of the Conservative Party of Canada.

== Notable people ==
Notable people who were born, grew up in or established their fame in Humboldt

- Kelly Bates, former CFL guard, former head coach with the Simon Fraser Clan (2015-2017), and current offensive line coach with the BC Lions
- Al Duerr, former mayor of Calgary, Alberta
- Jillian Gallays, wrestler
- Glenn Hall, former professional ice hockey goaltender. Stanley Cup champion and Hockey Hall of Fame inductee
- Lylian Klimek, sculptor
- Otto Lang, Rhodes Scholar, law school dean, Federal Cabinet Minister, and executive
- Brad Lauer, former NHL forward and current assistant coach with the Anaheim Ducks
- Ross Lonsberry, professional ice hockey player, two-time Stanley Cup champion with the Philadelphia Flyers
- Rusty Malinoski, professional wakeboarder
- Kyle McLaren, former NHL defenceman
- Nathan Paetsch, former NHL defenceman
- Lyndon Rush, 2010 Olympian bronze medal in four-man bobsleigh and 2014 Olympian Canadian bobsledder
- David Schmidtz, political philosopher
- Brianne Theisen-Eaton, 2012 and 2016 Olympian, heptathlete and Canadian record-holder in the women's pentathlon, 2016 Olympic bronze medallist (heptathlon)
- Dustin Tokarski, NHL Goaltender
- Brendan Witt, former NHL defenceman
- Jeremy Wotherspoon, speed skater with 67 World Cup wins
