= Annaheim, Saskatchewan =

Village in Saskatchewan, Canada

Annaheim
- Village
- Village of Annaheim
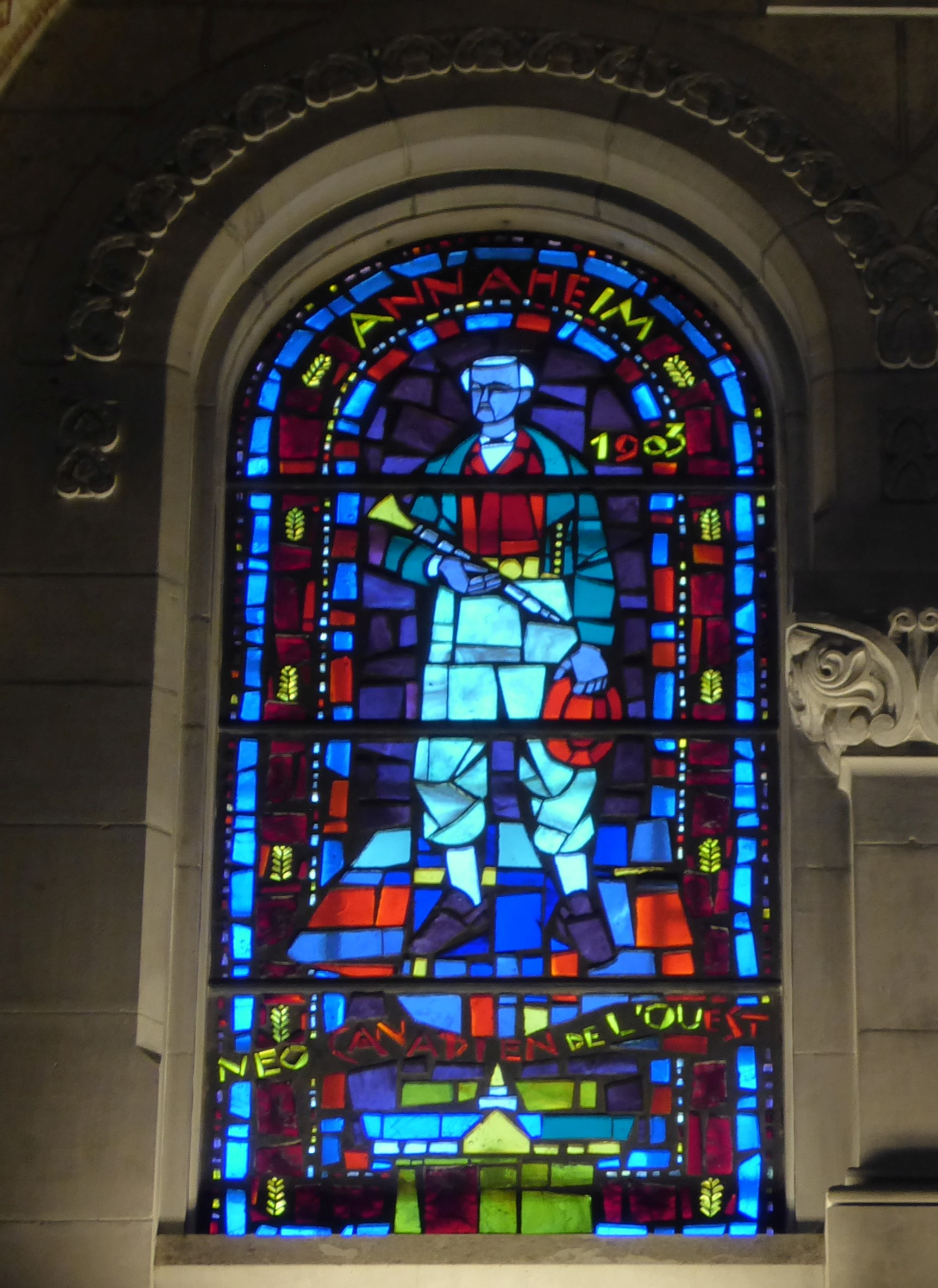

- Location of Annaheim in Saskatchewan Annaheim (Canada)
- Coordinates: 52.31835°N 104.82086°W
- Country: Canada
- Province: Saskatchewan
- Region: Central Saskatchewan
- Census division: 15
- Rural Municipality: St. Peter

Government
  - Type: Annaheim Village Council
  - Mayor: Brandon Doepker

Area
  - Land: 0.78 km^{2} (0.30 sq mi)

Population (2016)
  - Total: 239
  - Metro density: 280.4/km^{2} (726/sq mi)
- Time zone: CST
- Postal code: S0K 0G0
- Area code: 306

Annaheim (2016 population: 210) is a village in the Canadian province of Saskatchewan within the Rural Municipality of St. Peter No. 369 and Census Division No. 15. The village is located about 125 km east of the City of Saskatoon, at the junction of provincial Highway 756 and Highway 779. Annaheim hosts the offices of the Rural Municipality of St. Peter No. 369.

== History ==
Annaheim incorporated as a village on April 1, 1977. Annaheim means Anna's home (Anna's heim) in German.

== Demographics ==
Population history (1981–2016)
Year	Pop.	±%
1981	209	—
1986	202	−3.3%
1991	185	−8.4%
1996	214	+15.7%
2001	217	+1.4%
2006	218	+0.5%
2011	219	+0.5%
2016	210	−4.1%
Source: Statistics Canada via Saskatchewan Bureau of Statistics

In the 2021 Canadian census, Annaheim had a population of 206 living in 88 of its 95 total private dwellings, a change of −1.9% from its 2016 population of 210. With a land area of 0.7 km^{2} (0.27 sq mi), it had a population density of 294.3/km^{2} (762.2/sq mi) in 2021.

In the 2016 census, Annaheim recorded a population of 210 living in 87 of its 94 total private dwellings, a −4.3% change from its 2011 population of 219. With a land area of 0.78 km^{2} (0.30 sq mi), it had a population density of 269.2/km^{2} (697.3/sq mi) in 2016.

== Economy ==
Annaheim is the headquarters of Doepker Industries, a semi-trailer and heavy machinery manufacturer, which is also the community's main employer.

== Attractions ==
The village has a Roman Catholic church (St. Ann's Parish), a community hall, skating rink, credit union, post office, New Horizons recreation and senior centre (including a bowling alley) and a bar.

== Education ==
The school in Annaheim contains approximately 100 students, from kindergarten to grade 12. In September of 2021, Annaheim got a new class, the Pre-K class. There are still fewer than 100 students.

== See also ==
- List of communities in Saskatchewan
- List of villages in Saskatchewan
