= Leofeld =

Coordinates: 52.435260°N 105.639162°W

Leofeld, Saskatchewan, Canada, was founded in 1903 by Catholic German settlers. It is located seven miles south east of Cudworth, Saskatchewan in the rural municipality of Hoodoo 401. Shortly after the time of settlement a store, school, church and post office sprang up. The village started to shrink because of the railroad choosing to go through Cudworth, Saskatchewan instead. Today all that remains are the church and a few farmyards.

The St. Boniface Church (Leofeld Church) built in 1903 is on the Saskatchewan Register of Heritage Property.
