= St. Gregor, Saskatchewan =

Community in Saskatchewan, Canada

St. Gregor
- Village
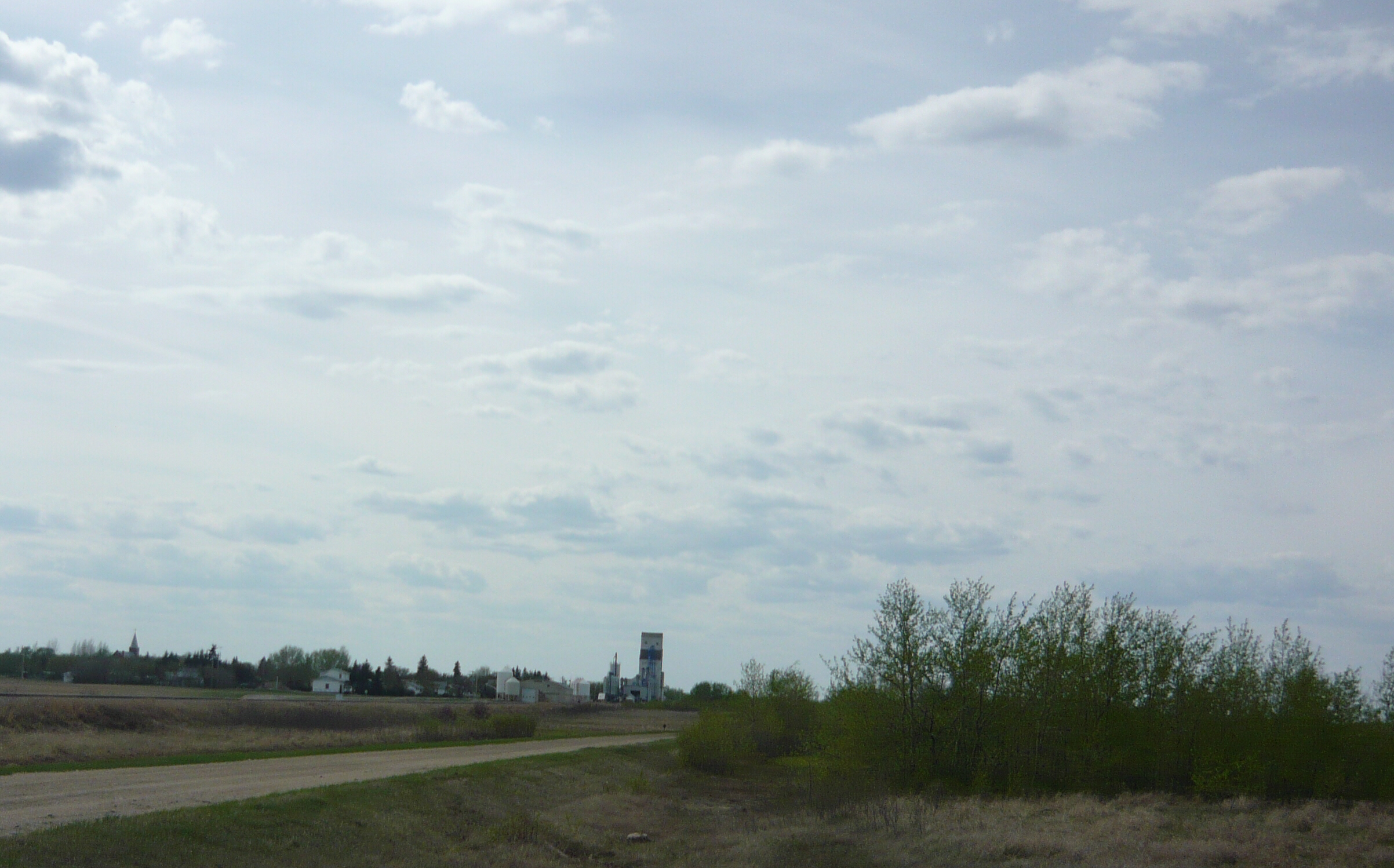

- Location within Saskatchewan Location within Canada
- Coordinates: 52°10′36″N 104°49′35″W
- Country: Canada
- Province: Saskatchewan
- Census division: 10
- Rural municipality: St. Peter No. 369
- Post office founded: N/A
- Incorporated (village): N/A
- Incorporated town): N/A

Government
  - Mayor: Doug Hogemann
  - Administrator: Darlene Kuz
  - Governing body: St. Gregor Village Council

Area
  - Total: 0.91 km^{2} (0.35 sq mi)

Population (2022)
  - Total: 104
  - Density: 123.7/km^{2} (320/sq mi)
- Time zone: CST
- Postal code: S0K 3X0
- Area code: 306
- Highways: Highway 5 Highway 667

St. Gregor (2016 population: 97) is a village in the Canadian province of Saskatchewan within the Rural Municipality of St. Peter No. 369 and Census Division No. 15. It is approximately 20 kilometres (12 mi) west of the town of Watson on Highway 5.

== History ==
St. Gregor incorporated as a village on March 26, 1920.

== Demographics ==
Population history (1981–2016)
Year	Pop.	±%
1981	140	—
1986	148	+5.7%
1991	136	−8.1%
1996	128	−5.9%
2001	121	−5.5%
2006	102	−15.7%
2011	98	−3.9%
2016	97	−1.0%
2021	104	+7.2%
Source: Statistics Canada via Saskatchewan Bureau of Statistics

In the 2021 Census of Population conducted by Statistics Canada, St. Gregor had a population of 104 living in 46 of its 49 total private dwellings, a change of 7.2% from its 2016 population of 97. With a land area of 0.84 km^{2} (0.32 sq mi), it had a population density of 123.8/km^{2} (320.7/sq mi) in 2021.

In the 2016 Census of Population, the Village of St. Gregor recorded a population of 97 living in 42 of its 48 total private dwellings, a −1% change from its 2011 population of 98. With a land area of 0.91 km^{2} (0.35 sq mi), it had a population density of 106.6/km^{2} (276.1/sq mi) in 2016.

== See also ==
- List of communities in Saskatchewan
- List of villages in Saskatchewan
