= Pilger, Saskatchewan =

Village in Saskatchewan, Canada

Village of Pilger
- Location of Pilger in Saskatchewan Village of Pilger (Canada)
- Coordinates: 52°26′24″N 105°17′49″W
- Country: Canada
- Province: Saskatchewan
- Region: Saskatchewan
- Census division: 15
- Rural Municipality: Three Lakes No. 400
- Post office Founded: 1908
- Incorporated (Village): 1 January 1969

Government
  - Mayor: Ardean Bregenser
  - Administrator: Rhonda Hemm
  - Governing body: Pilger Village Council

Area
  - Total: 0.52 km^{2} (0.20 sq mi)

Population (2006)
  - Total: 74
  - Density: 165/km^{2} (430/sq mi)
- Time zone: CST
- Postal code: S0K 3G0
- Area code: 306
- Highways: Highway 20

Pilger (2016 population: 65) is a village in the Canadian province of Saskatchewan within the Rural Municipality of Three Lakes No. 400 and Census Division No. 15. It is approximately 100 kilometres (62 mi) northeast of the city of Saskatoon.

== History ==
Pilger incorporated as a village on 1 January 1969.

== Demographics ==
Population history (1981–2016)
Year	Pop.	±%
1981	150	—
1986	137	−8.7%
1991	102	−25.5%
1996	106	+3.9%
2001	85	−19.8%
2006	74	−12.9%
2011	65	−12.2%
2016	65	+0.0%
Source: Statistics Canada via Saskatchewan Bureau of Statistics

In the 2021 Census of Population conducted by Statistics Canada, Pilger had a population of 65 living in 36 of its 42 total private dwellings, a change of 0% from its 2016 population of 65. With a land area of 0.49 km^{2} (0.19 sq mi), it had a population density of 132.7/km^{2} (343.6/sq mi) in 2021.

In the 2016 Census of Population, the Village of Pilger recorded a population of 65 living in 39 of its 46 total private dwellings, a 0% change from its 2011 population of 65. With a land area of 0.52 km^{2} (0.20 sq mi), it had a population density of 125.0/km^{2} (323.7/sq mi) in 2016.

== Climate ==
Climate data for Pilger
Month	Jan	Feb	Mar	Apr	May	Jun	Jul	Aug	Sep	Oct	Nov	Dec	Year
Record high °C (°F)	7.8 (46.0)	10 (50)	17.5 (63.5)	31.1 (88.0)	35.6 (96.1)	38.6 (101.5)	37.8 (100.0)	38.9 (102.0)	38.3 (100.9)	29.4 (84.9)	18.9 (66.0)	10.6 (51.1)	41.7 (107.1)
Mean daily maximum °C (°F)	−13.1 (8.4)	−8.5 (16.7)	−1.6 (29.1)	9.5 (49.1)	18.3 (64.9)	22 (72)	24 (75)	23.7 (74.7)	17.3 (63.1)	10 (50)	−2.7 (27.1)	−10.4 (13.3)	7.4 (45.3)
Daily mean °C (°F)	−18.3 (−0.9)	−13.8 (7.2)	−7 (19)	3.3 (37.9)	11.2 (52.2)	15.6 (60.1)	17.6 (63.7)	16.9 (62.4)	11 (52)	4.2 (39.6)	−7 (19)	−15.3 (4.5)	1.5 (34.7)
Mean daily minimum °C (°F)	−23.5 (−10.3)	−19.1 (−2.4)	−12.3 (9.9)	−2.9 (26.8)	4.1 (39.4)	9.2 (48.6)	11.2 (52.2)	10.1 (50.2)	4.6 (40.3)	−1.6 (29.1)	−11.2 (11.8)	−20 (−4)	−4.3 (24.3)
Record low °C (°F)	−49.4 (−56.9)	−47.8 (−54.0)	−41.1 (−42.0)	−31.7 (−25.1)	−12.2 (10.0)	−5.6 (21.9)	−2.2 (28.0)	−2 (28)	−11.1 (12.0)	−26.1 (−15.0)	−35.6 (−32.1)	−50.6 (−59.1)	−50.6 (−59.1)
Average precipitation mm (inches)	22.2 (0.87)	14.9 (0.59)	20.1 (0.79)	27.4 (1.08)	47.4 (1.87)	71.3 (2.81)	75.6 (2.98)	56.1 (2.21)	40.5 (1.59)	23.7 (0.93)	15.9 (0.63)	20.1 (0.79)	435.3 (17.14)
Source: Environment Canada

== Culture ==
The village has the Pilger Public Library and an autobody shop. Pilger is home to the Annual Pilger Pumpkin Growing Contest. The festival is held on the last Saturday of September, and hosts over 500 attendees every year.

== See also ==
- List of communities in Saskatchewan
- List of villages in Saskatchewan
