= Fulda, Saskatchewan =

Community in Saskatchewan, Canada

Coordinates: 52°22′14″N 105°13′00″W

Fulda is a community in Saskatchewan, Canada, located north of Humboldt on Highway 20. It is named after the city of Fulda, Germany which many of the early settlers had come from. The name Fulda is derived from the old high German word Fultaha which means water land. The name is appropriate for the area surrounding it because there are also numerous lakes and creeks.

== See also ==
- List of communities in Saskatchewan
