= Prairie Spirit School Division =

School division in Saskatchewan, Canada

Prairie Spirit School Division No. 206

Location
- 121 Collins Street; Box 809; Warman; S0K 4S0 28 Aberdeen, Allan, Asquith, Blaine Lake, Borden, Clavet, Colonsay, Corman Park, Dalmeny, Delisle, Duck Lake, Dundurn, Hague, Hanley, Hepburn, Laird, Langham, Leask, Marcelin, Martensville, Osler, Perdue, Pike Lake, Rosthern, Vanscoy, Tessier, Waldheim, Warman Canada

District information
- Chair of the board: Ms. Kate Kading
- Director of education: Ms. Tracey Young
- Schools: 45

Students and staff
- Students: 11,511 (2026)

Other information
- Website: www.spiritsd.ca

Prairie Spirit Logo

Prairie Spirit School Division No. 206 has 46 schools located in 28 communities surrounding the city of Saskatoon, Saskatchewan which includes 3 First Nations and 9 Hutterite communities. The student population of approximately 11,500 surrounds the city of Saskatoon, Saskatchewan as a ring of rural communities around the urban centre.

Prairie Spirit School Division is under the jurisdiction of the Saskatchewan Ministry of Education.

Schools of Prairie Spirit School Division
School	Location	Grade start	Grade end
Aberdeen Composite School	Aberdeen	K	12
Allan Composite School	Allan	PreK	12
Blaine Lake Composite School	Blaine Lake	K	12
Borden School	Borden	K	12
Clavet Composite School	Clavet	PreK	12
Colonsay School	Colonsay	K	12
Dalmeny High School	Dalmeny	7	12
Delisle Composite School	Delisle	7	12
Delisle Elementary School	Delisle	K	6
Dundurn School	Dundurn	PreK	6
Eagle Creek Colony School	Asquith	K	9
Green Leaf Colony School	Marcelin	K	10
Hague Elementary School	Hague	PreK	6
Hague High School	Hague	7	12
Hanley School	Hanley	K	12
Hepburn School	Hepburn	K	12
Hillcrest Colony School	Dundurn	K	9
Laird School	Laird	K	8
Lake Vista Public School	Martensville	PreK	8
Langham Elementary School	Langham	K	3
Leask Colony	Leask	K	10
Leask Community School	Leask	PreK	12
Lord Asquith School	Asquith	PreK	12
Lost River Colony School	Allan	K	10
Martensville High School	Martensville	9	12
Osler School	Osler	K	9
Perdue School	Perdue	K	12
Pike Lake School	Saskatoon	K	4
Prairie View School	Dalmeny	K	6
Riverbend Colony School	Waldheim	K	11
Riverview Colony School	Aberdeen	K	10
Rosthern Community School	Rosthern	PreK	12
South Corman Park School	Corman Park	K	6
Stobart Community School	Duck Lake	PreK	12
Sunnydale Colony School	Warman	K	9
Traditions Elementary School	Warman	K	5
Valley Manor Elementary School	Martensville	K	8
Vanscoy School	Vanscoy	K	8
Venture Heights Elementary School	Martensville	K	8
Waldheim School	Waldheim	K	12
Walter W. Brown School	Langham	4	12
Warman Community Middle School	Warman	6	8
École Warman Elementary School	Warman	PreK	5
Warman High School	Warman	9	12
Willow Park Colony School	Tessier	K	10

== See also ==
- List of school divisions in Saskatchewan
