= Saskatchewan Highway 305 =

Provincial highway in Saskatchewan, Canada

Highway 305

Route information
- Maintained by Ministry of Highways and Infrastructure
- Length: 30 km (19 mi)

Major junctions
- West end: Highway 16 (TCH/YH) near Langham
- Highway 12 near Martensville
- East end: Highway 11 near Warman

Location
- Country: Canada
- Province: Saskatchewan
- Rural municipalities: Corman Park
- Major cities: Warman
- Towns: Langham, Dalmeny

Highway system
- Provincial highways in Saskatchewan
← Highway 304	→ Highway 306

Highway 305 is a provincial highway in the Canadian province of Saskatchewan. It runs from Highway 16 near Langham to Highway 11 near Warman. It is about 30 kilometres (19 mi) long.

== History ==
Highway 305 was the original alignment of Highway 16, which at the time was designated as Provincial Highway 5. At the time, the highway continued east from Warman, crossed the South Saskatchewan River via a ferry, and continued east to Aberdeen and Humboldt. By the mid-1950s, Highway 5 was rerouted to follow Highway 12 south and pass through Saskatoon, bypassing the Warman ferry. In the 1960s, Highway 5 was realigned between Langham and Saskatoon, and the bypassed section was re-designated as Highway 305. Until 2014, Highway 305 followed Central Street (Highway 784) through Warman and ended at Highway 11, until a new bypass was opened in 2014.

== Route description ==
Highway 305 begins at Highway 16 at the south-eastern corner of the Langham town limits. It travels east towards Dalmeny where it turns south until it intersects Highways 684 and 784. The highway resumes travelling east, intersecting Highway 12 approximately 3 kilometres (1.9 mi) north of Martensville. It bypasses Warman, following the northern city boundary, and ends at Highway 11. In 2019, an interchange with Highway 11 was opened, modifying traffic patterns around other existing intersections.

== Major intersections ==
The entire route is in Corman Park No. 344.

Location	km	mi	Destinations	Notes
Langham	0	0.0	Highway 16 (TCH/YH) – The Battlefords, Saskatoon	
Dalmeny	11.5	7.1	1st Street	
	13.8	8.6	Highway 784 west / Dalmeny Road (Highway 684 south)	
	20.3	12.6	Highway 12 – Blaine Lake, Martensville, Saskatoon	
	23.2	14.4	Old Highway 305 east – Warman	Former Highway 305 alignment; becomes Central Street in Warman
Warman	28.4	17.6	Neuhorst access road / Centennial Boulevard	
Warman	30.2	18.8	Highway 11 – Prince Albert, Saskatoon Range Road 3044 east to Highway 784 – Clarkboro Ferry	Interchange; continues as Range Road 3044
1.000 mi = 1.609 km; 1.000 km = 0.621 mi

== See also ==
- Transportation in Saskatchewan
- Roads in Saskatchewan
