= Saskatoon Co-op =

Saskatoon Co-operative Association Limited
- Type: Cooperative
- Industry: Groceries; Petroleum; Hardware
- Headquarters: Saskatoon, Saskatchewan
- Revenue: $313 million
- Net income: $32.5 million
- Total assets: $146 million
- Number of employees: 1,000
- Website: www.saskatooncoop.ca

Saskatoon Co-operative Association Limited (commonly referred to as Saskatoon Co-op) is a retail cooperative. A member of Federated Co-operatives, it is headquartered in Saskatoon and has operations in the city and surrounding municipalities

== Present operations ==
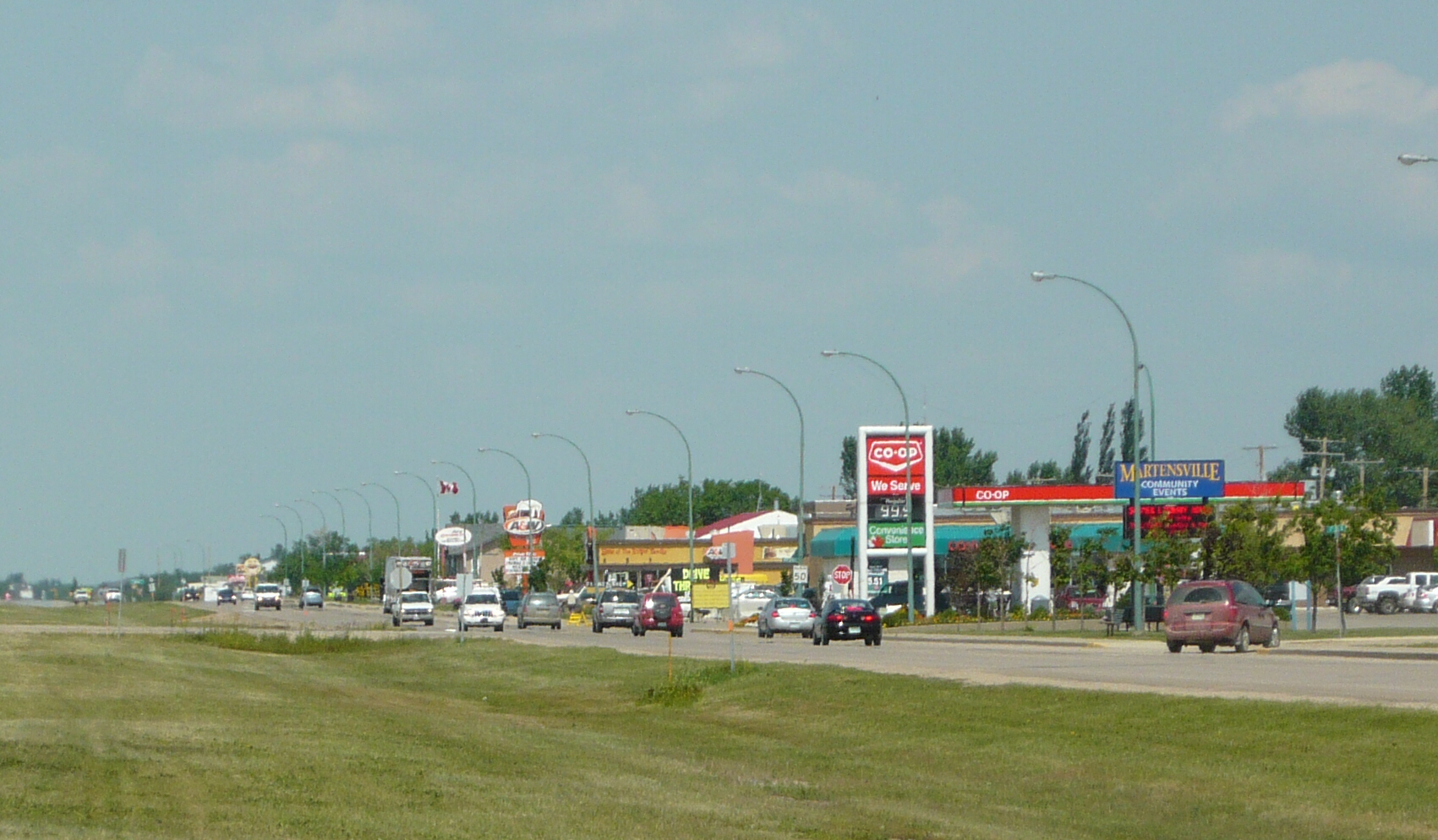
Saskatoon Co-op Gas Bar in Martensville

Saskatoon Co-op, which achieved sales of $503 million in 2021, operates six retail food stores, Seven wine, spirits and beer stores, two home centres, one agro centre, 13 gas bars/convenience stores, seven car washes and one hybrid store in Colonsay. Alongside Saskatoon, it has operations in Watrous, Colonsay, Dalmeny, Hepburn, Martensville, Rosthern, Waldheim, and Warman. The co-op has 109,000 members and 1,140 employees.

== History ==
In 2014, Saskatoon Co-op opened Saskatoon's first private liquor store, occupying 10,000 square feet at Blairmore centre. It is one of the biggest liquor stores in the city.

In 2014, Saskatoon Co-op acquired the Safeway location in 8th Street in Saskatoon; it was divested as part of Sobeys' acquisition of Safeway. They then relocated the Home Centre on 8th Street into its former grocery store, and then opened a liquor store in the former Home Centre location.

In 2017, the Saskatchewan Rush of the National Lacrosse League reached a five-year sponsorship deal with Saskatoon Co-op, under which the team's venue is referred to as "Co-op Field at SaskTel Centre" during its games.

In November 2018, UFCW Local 1400 workers at Saskatoon Co-op went on strike (Note: Workers at a former Safeway that was acquired by Saskatoon Co-op did not participate in the strike. The employees at this location were represented by the Retail, Wholesale and Department Store Union) over a proposed two-tier salary structure that would place newer employees on a lower pay grid. The union and Saskatoon Co-op reached an agreement in April 2019 that ended the strike.

In February 2019, Hepburn Co-op amalgamated into Saskatoon Co-op, expanding its operations to include Dalmeny, Hepburn, Rosthern, and Waldheim.

== See also ==
- List of Co-operative Federations
- List of Canadian supermarkets
