= Saskatchewan Highway 12 =

Provincial highway in Saskatchewan, Canada

Highway 12
- Highway 12 highlighted in red

Route information
- Maintained by Ministry of Highways and Infrastructure
- Length: 133.9 km (83.2 mi)

Major junctions
- South end: Highway 11 north of Saskatoon
- Highway 40 in Blaine Lake
- North end: Highway 3 near Shell Lake

Location
- Country: Canada
- Province: Saskatchewan
- Rural municipalities: Corman Park No. 344, Laird No. 404, Great Bend No. 405, Blaine Lake No. 434, Leask No. 464, Canwood No. 494
- Major cities: Martensville, Saskatoon
- Towns: Blaine Lake
- Villages: Shell Lake

Highway system
- Provincial highways in Saskatchewan
← Highway 11	→ Highway 13

Highway 12 is a major north–south provincial highway in the Canadian province of Saskatchewan. It begins at the north end of Saskatoon at the intersection of Idylwyld Drive and Highway 11 North (formerly beginning further south at the intersection with 22nd Street in downtown Saskatoon). Just outside Saskatoon's northern city limits, Highway 11 exits north-east from Idylwyld Drive and Highway 12 begins and travels north, passing along the western side of Martensville. The section of 12 from Martensville south to Saskatoon is twinned. Highway 12 then crosses the North Saskatchewan River over the Petrofka Bridge, passes through the town of Blaine Lake, and intersects Highway 40. It terminates at Highway 3 near Shell Lake. Highway 12 is about 135 kilometres (84 mi) long.

== History ==
Provincial Highway 12 was originally the designated route which connected Saskatoon and Prince Albert, following present-day Highway 12 to the Hepburn area, then following present-day Highway 312 to Rosthern, before continuing northwest to Prince Albert. In the mid-1950s, the route was renumbered to Highway 11; however, in the 1960s, Highway 11 was realigned to follow a more direct route to Rosthern through Warman and Hague. Combined with the opening of the Petrofka Bridge in 1962, Highway 12 was revived and went to Highway 40 at Blaine Lake. In the 1970s, Highway 12 was extended north to Shell Lake.

== Route description ==
The southern terminus of Highway 12 begins at the intersection with Highway 11, just north of Saskatoon. From that point, Highway 11 continues south into Saskatoon running concurrently with Idylwyld Drive and, in the other direction, heads north-east to Warman. Highway 12 heads north with the first 10 kilometres (6.2 mi) to Martensville being twinned. Access to Martensville is by a partial cloverleaf interchange. Continuing north as a two-laned highway, it intersects Highway 305 then 375 near Hepburn. After that intersection, it curves north-west, intersects Highway 312, and continues to the North Saskatchewan River. It crosses the river via the Petrofka Bridge, meets Highway 781 near the former Doukhobor village of Petrofka, provides access to the Petrofka Recreation Site, and then resumes its northerly heading to Blaine Lake and Highway 40.

Highway 12 intersects Highway 40 on the south side of Blaine Lake. The highway then travels north-west through town as Main Street. Heading out of town, it continues its north-westerly travel for almost 5 kilometres (3.1 mi) before turning west. After about 5.5 kilometres (3.4 mi) of westerly travel, it turns north en route to its northern terminus at Highway 3, just south of the community of Shell Lake. Along this stretch of highway, it intersects Highways 786 and 792, runs along the eastern slopes of the Thickwood Hills, and provides access to Iroquois Lake and Big Shell Lake and the associated communities and amenities.

== Major intersections ==
From south to north:

Rural municipality	Location	km	mi	Destinations	Notes
City of Saskatoon		−5.1	−3.2	Idylwyld Drive south – City Centre Circle Drive (Highway 11 south / Highway 16 (TCH) east) – Airport, Yorkton, Regina	Interchange; former Hwy 12 southern terminus
City of Saskatoon		−3.8	−2.4	Avenue C south / 51 Street east – Airport	Interchange
City of Saskatoon		−2.6	−1.6	Highway 16 (TCH/YH) west – The Battlefords	Interchange; northbound exit and southbound entrance; north end of Hwy 16 concurrency
Corman Park No. 344		0.0	0.0	Highway 11 north – Warman, Prince Albert	Interchange; northbound exit and southbound entrance; Hwy 12 southern terminus
City of Martensville		8.7	5.4	Township Road 384	Interchange
Corman Park No. 344		11.9	7.4	Highway 305 – Dalmeny, Warman	
Laird No. 404		24.9	15.5	Greenfeld access road	
Laird No. 404		34.6	21.5	Highway 375 west – Hepburn Highway 785 east – Hague	
Laird No. 404		35.7	22.2	Highway 312 north – Waldheim, Rosthern	
Laird No. 404		48.5	30.1	Waldheim access road	
↑ / ↓		52.9	32.9	Petrofka Bridge across the North Saskatchewan River	
Great Bend No. 405		55.2	34.3	Highway 781 west	
Blaine Lake No. 434	Blaine Lake	73.9	45.9	Highway 40 – The Battlefords, Prince Albert	
Leask No. 464		91.1	56.6	Highway 786 east – Marcelin	
Leask No. 464		112.9	70.2	Highway 792 east – Leask	
Canwood No. 494	Shell Lake	133.9	83.2	Highway 3 – Glaslyn, Prince Albert Shell Lake access road	Hwy 12 northern terminus
1.000 mi = 1.609 km; 1.000 km = 0.621 mi: Closed/former; Incomplete access

== See also ==
- Transportation in Saskatchewan
- Roads in Saskatchewan
