= Saskatchewan Highway 375 =

Provincial highway in Saskatchewan, Canada

Highway 375
- Hepburn Access Road

Route information
- Maintained by Ministry of Highways and Infrastructure
- Length: 3.3 km (2.1 mi)

Major junctions
- West end: Hepburn
- East end: Highway 12 / Highway 785 near Hepburn

Location
- Country: Canada
- Province: Saskatchewan
- Rural municipalities: Laird

Highway system
- Provincial highways in Saskatchewan
← Highway 374	→ Highway 376

Highway 375, also known as Hepburn Access Road, is an unsigned provincial highway in the Canadian province of Saskatchewan. It runs from the junction of Highway 12 and Highway 785 to the town of Hepburn. It is about 3.3 kilometres (2.1 mi) long.

== Major intersections ==
From west to east:

Rural municipality	Location	km	mi	Destinations	Notes
Laird No. 404	Hepburn	0.0	0.0	2nd Avenue S / 4th Street E	Western terminus; road continues west as 2nd Avenue S
Laird No. 404		3.3	2.1	Highway 12 – Blaine Lake, Saskatoon Highway 785 east – Hague	Eastern terminus of Hwy 375; western terminus of Hwy 785; road continues east as Hwy 785
1.000 mi = 1.609 km; 1.000 km = 0.621 mi

== See also ==
- Transportation in Saskatchewan
- Roads in Saskatchewan
