= Ag in Motion =

Annual farm show in Saskatchewan, Canada

Ag in Motion is an annual outdoor agricultural trade show held each July near Langham, Saskatchewan, Canada, approximately 40 kilometres northwest of Saskatoon. Described as Western Canada's largest outdoor farm expo, it attracts more than 30,000 attendees and over 550 exhibitors annually. The show is owned and operated by Glacier FarmMedia, the agricultural media division of Glacier Media.

== History ==
Ag in Motion was founded in 2015 by Glacier FarmMedia. The show was established on farmland near Langham, Saskatchewan to showcase working agricultural equipment in real field conditions rather than in an indoor exhibition hall setting.

By its tenth anniversary in 2024, Ag in Motion had grown to attract approximately 10,000 daily visitors and more than 600 exhibitors from the crop, livestock, and other agricultural sectors — the most in the event's history at that point. Total attendance in 2023 reached 31,166.

In 2025, the Government of Saskatchewan welcomed delegations from 16 countries to the event, including representatives from Australia, Armenia, India, Ireland, Mongolia, the Netherlands, Poland, the United States, and the United Arab Emirates. That year the show was also named Business Event of the Year by Tourism Canada.

== Format and features ==
The show runs for three days each July on a 40-hectare (100-acre) site near Langham, Saskatchewan. A defining feature is the use of working farmland as the show floor, with live machinery demonstrations conducted in the field and plots of test crops where companies display plants grown with proprietary technology.

Exhibitors and visitors come from across North America and, increasingly, from around the world. The show includes a trade exhibition component as well as entertainment features such as antique tractor pulls and food vendors. It also serves as a networking venue for agricultural professionals and students.

In 2016, the show featured a 4-H Day with farm safety programming for young attendees.
