= Doukhobor Dugout House =

- Interactive map of Doukhobor Dugout House
- Type: Homestead
- Location: Rural Municipality of Blaine Lake No. 434, Saskatchewan, Canada
- Coordinates: 52°45′15″N 106°43′26″W
- Built: 1899
- Architectural style: Dugout

National Historic Site of Canada
- Designated: October 29, 2008

The Doukhobor Dugout House is a National Historic Site of Canada located near Blaine Lake. The site consists of the remains of a log dugout built by Doukhobor settlers in Saskatchewan. It is a rare surviving example of the impermanent construction methods utilized by settlers of Western Canada. The site became a Provincial Heritage Property in 2005.

The site's importance rose in 2004 after an archaeological investigation conducted by the University of Saskatchewan. The investigation demonstrated the value of archaeology in uncovering and documenting the history of the Doukhobors in Saskatchewan.
