= List of towns in Saskatchewan =

A town is a type of incorporated urban municipality in the Canadian province of Saskatchewan. A resort village or a village can be incorporated as a town by the Minister of Municipal Affairs via section 52 of The Municipalities Act if:

- Requested by the council of the resort village or village; and
- the resort village or village has a population of 500 or more.

Saskatchewan has 146 towns that had a cumulative population of 137,725 and an average population of 943 in the 2011 Census. Saskatchewan's largest and smallest towns are Kindersley and Scott with populations of 4,678 and 75 respectively.

A city can be created from a town by the Minister of Municipal Affairs by ministerial order via section 39 of The Cities Act if the town has a population of 5,000 or more and the change in status is requested by the town council.

== List ==
Name	Rural municipality (RM)	Population (2021)	Population (2016)	Population (2011)	Population (2006)	Change (%)	Land area (km^{2})	Population density (per km^{2})
Aberdeen	Aberdeen No. 373	716	662	599	527	13.7	1.95	307
Alameda	Moose Creek No. 33	345	369	342	308	11	2.55	133.9
Allan	Blucher No. 343	625	644	648	631	2.7	1.78	363.2
Arborfield	Arborfield No. 456	285	312	326	329	−0.9	0.88	370.5
Arcola	Brock No. 64	636	657	649	509	27.5	3.39	191.5
Asquith	Vanscoy No. 345	624	639	603	576	4.7	1.23	491.4
Assiniboia	Lake of the Rivers No. 72	2,333	2,424	2,418	2,305	4.9	3.78	639.8
Balcarres	Abernethy No. 186	616	587	617	598	3.2	1.57	392.9
Balgonie	Edenwold No. 158	1,756	1,765	1,625	1,384	17.4	3.15	515.8
Battleford	Battle River No. 438	4,400	4,429	4,065	3,685	10.3	23.33	174.2
Bengough	Bengough No. 40	332	332	313	337	−7.1	1.07	292
Bienfait	Coalfields No. 4	668	762	780	748	4.3	3.09	252.4
Big River	Big River No. 555	666	700	639	728	−12.2	2.51	255
Biggar	Biggar No. 347	2,133	2,226	2,161	2,033	6.3	15.75	137.2
Birch Hills	Birch Hills No. 460	1,066	1,033	1,064	935	13.8	2.27	468.4
Blaine Lake	Blaine Lake No. 434	509	499	510	472	8.1	1.95	261.6
Bredenbury	Saltcoats No. 213	386	372	364	329	10.6	4.8	75.8
Broadview	Elcapo No. 154	541	552	574	611	−6.1	2.45	233.8
Bruno	Bayne No. 371	604	611	574	495	16	0.95	606.1
Burstall	Deer Forks No. 232	302	278	301	315	−4.4	1.11	270
Cabri	Riverside No. 168	413	390	399	439	−9.1	1.33	298.9
Canora	Good Lake No. 274	2,092	2,024	2,219	2,013	10.2	7.31	303.7
Carlyle	Moose Mountain No. 63	1,524	1,508	1,441	1,257	14.6	3.19	451.1
Carnduff	Mount Pleasant No. 2	1,150	1,099	1,126	1,012	11.3	2.26	497.3
Carrot River	Moose Range No. 486	946	973	1,000	941	6.3	1.42	706.4
Central Butte	Enfield No. 194	416	372	365	372	−1.9	2.24	163.2
Choiceland	Torch River No. 488	342	359	381	346	10.1	1.12	340.8
Churchbridge	Churchbridge No. 211	866	896	743	704	5.5	2.76	269.2
Colonsay	Colonsay No. 342	446	451	475	425	11.8	2.46	193.1
Coronach	Hart Butte No. 11	612	643	711	770	−7.7	2.33	304.9
Craik	Craik No. 222	405	392	453	408	11	3.02	150
Cudworth	Hoodoo No. 401	772	814	770	738	4.3	2.21	348.7
Cupar	Cupar No. 218	598	564	579	566	2.3	0.8	726.7
Cut Knife	Cut Knife No. 439	547	573	517	532	−2.8	1.99	259.3
Dalmeny	Corman Park No. 344	1,766	1,826	1,702	1,560	9.1	2.27	751
Davidson	Arm River No. 252	1,044	1,048	1,025	958	7	4.49	228.4
Delisle	Vanscoy No. 345	1,024	1,038	975	898	8.6	2.49	391.3
Duck Lake	Duck Lake No. 463	579	569	577	605	−4.6	2.73	211.6
Dundurn	Dundurn No. 314	675	611	693	647	7.1	1.37	505.3
Eastend	White Valley No. 49	607	503	527	471	11.9	2.71	194.7
Eatonia	Chesterfield No. 261	498	524	508	449	13.1	1.68	301.6
Elrose	Monet No. 257	470	496	477	453	5.3	2.76	172.8
Esterhazy	Fertile Belt No. 183	2,345	2,502	2,472	2,336	5.8	4.75	520.9
Eston	Snipe Lake No. 259	972	1061	1,031	971	6.2	2.72	379.3
Fleming	Moosomin No. 121	70	84	83	75	10.7	2.17	38.3
Foam Lake	Foam Lake No. 276	1,183	1,141	1,148	1,123	2.2	6.06	189.4
Fort Qu'Appelle	North Qu'Appelle No. 187	1,972	2,042	2,034	1,919	6	5.28	385
Francis	Francis No. 127	182	217	176	148	18.9	0.59	297.4
Govan	Last Mountain Valley No. 250	200	194	216	232	−6.9	1.35	159.7
Grand Coulee	Sherwood No. 159	606	649	571	435	31.3	0.33	1,707.5
Gravelbourg	Gravelbourg No. 104	986	1,083	1,116	1,089	2.5	3.23	346
Grenfell	Elcapo No. 154	1,059	1.099	1,049	947	10.8	3.17	331.2
Gull Lake	Gull Lake No. 139	908	1,046	989	965	2.5	2.5	395.6
Hafford	Redberry No. 435	414	407	397	360	10.3	0.8	496.8
Hague	Rosthern No. 403	889	874	878	707	24.2	1.08	815.5
Hanley	Rosedale No. 283	540	511	522	464	12.5	2.65	196.8
Hepburn	Laird No. 404	784	688	562	530	6	1.02	548.4
Herbert	Morse No. 165	770	856	759	742	2.3	3.78	200.7
Hudson Bay	Hudson Bay No. 394	1,403	1,436	1,900	1,646	−8.6	17.35	86.7
Imperial	Big Arm No. 251	372	360	349	321	8.7	1.23	283.5
Indian Head	Indian Head No. 156	1,902	1,910	1,815	1,634	11.1	3.17	572.1
Ituna	Ituna Bon Accord No. 246	726	701	711	622	14.3	1.56	455.5
Kamsack	Cote No. 271	1,779	1,898	1,825	1,713	6.5	5.85	311.8
Kelvington	Kelvington No. 366	827	834	890	866	2.8	3.89	228.8
Kerrobert	Progress No. 351	970	1,026	1,061	1,001	6	7.49	141.7
Kindersley	Kindersley No. 290	4,567	4,597	4,678	4,412	6	12.55	372.8
Kinistino	Kinistino No. 459	671	654	743	643	15.6	0.98	758.8
Kipling	Kingsley No. 124	1,076	1,074	1,051	973	8	2.15	487.9
Kyle	Lacadena No. 228	413	449	437	423	3.3	1.14	383.1
Lafleche	Wood River No. 74	373	382	406	370	9.7	1.51	269.7
Lampman	Browning No. 34	676	675	713	634	12.5	2.23	319.9
Langenburg	Langenburg No. 181	1,228	1,165	1,148	1,048	9.5	3.46	332.2
Langham	Corman Park No. 344	1,518	1,496	1,290	1,120	15.2	3.98	324.4
Lanigan	Usborne No. 310	1,433	1,377	1,390	1,233	12.7	8.34	166.8
Lashburn	Wilton No. 472	870	983	967	914	5.8	3.11	310.5
Leader	Happyland No. 231	881	863	821	881	−6.8	1.71	481.2
Lemberg	Abernethy No. 186	266	313	274	255	7.5	2.67	102.7
Leroy	Leroy No. 339	510	450	427	412	3.6	1.06	402.1
Lumsden	Lumsden No. 189	1,800	1,824	1,631	1,523	7.1	4.06	402
Luseland	Progress No. 351	559	623	566	571	−0.9	1.53	369.6
Macklin	Eye Hill No. 382	1,247	1,374	1,415	1,290	9.7	3.14	450.7
Maidstone	Eldon No. 471	1,209	1,185	1,156	1,037	11.5	4.56	253.5
Maple Creek	Maple Creek No. 111	2,176	2,084	2,176	2,198	−1	4.42	492.1
Marshall	Wilton No. 472	522	591	594	608	−2.3	1.01	588.1
Midale	Cymri No. 36	510	604	562	462	21.6	1.53	368.5
Milestone	Brock No. 64	682	699	618	562	10	2.17	284.4
Moosomin	Moosomin No. 121	2,657	2,743	2,485	2,262	9.9	7.59	327.5
Morse	Morse No. 165	216	242	240	236	1.7	1.45	165.7
Mossbank	Lake Johnston No. 102	368	360	327	330	−0.9	1.75	186.8
Naicam	Pleasantdale No. 398	651	661	686	690	−0.6	1.69	405.5
Nipawin	Nipawin No. 487	4,570	4,401	4,265	4,076	4.6	8.71	489.4
Nokomis	Wreford No. 280	414	404	397	404	−1.7	2.61	152.3
Norquay	Clayton No. 333	240	434	435	412	5.6	1.69	258
Ogema	Key West No. 70	383	403	368	304	21.1	1.43	257.6
Osler	Corman Park No. 344	1,251	1,237	1,088	926	17.5	1.55	700.6
Outlook	Rudy No. 284	2,336	2,279	2,204	1,938	13.7	7.83	281.3
Oxbow	Enniskillen No. 3	1,286	1,328	1,285	1,139	12.8	3.13	410
Pense	Pense No. 160	603	587	532	507	4.9	1.32	402.6
Pilot Butte	Edenwold No. 158	2,638	2,137	1,848	1,872	−1.3	5.05	365.6
Ponteix	Auvergne No. 76	577	563	605	531	13.9	1.09	556
Porcupine Plain	Porcupine No. 395	817	862	855	783	9.2	2.27	377.2
Preeceville	Preeceville No. 334	1,062	1,125	1,070	1,050	1.9	3.06	350.2
Qu'Appelle	South Qu'Appelle No. 157	625	639	668	624	7.1	4.22	158.1
Radisson	Great Bend No. 405	416	514	505	421	20	2.07	243.6
Radville	Laurier No. 38	778	804	860	793	8.4	2.16	398.6
Raymore	Moose Range No. 486	507	575	568	581	−2.2	2.75	206.8
Redvers	Antler No. 61	1,008	1,042	975	878	11	2.96	329
Regina Beach	Lumsden No. 189	1,292	1,145	1,081	1,210	−10.7	3.88	278.5
Rocanville	Rocanville No. 151	889	863	857	869	−1.4	2.43	352.3
Rockglen	Poplar Valley No. 12	399	441	400	366	9.3	2.85	140.4
Rose Valley	Ponass Lake No. 367	256	282	296	338	−12.4	1.12	263.4
Rosetown	St. Andrews No. 287	2,507	2,451	2,317	2,277	1.8	12.14	190.8
Rosthern	Rosthern No. 403	1,602	1,688	1,572	1,382	13.7	4.31	365
Rouleau	Redburn No. 130	505	540	453	400	13.3	1.61	282.2
Saltcoats	Saltcoats No. 213	473	484	474	467	1.5	1.35	352.2
Scott	Tramping Lake No. 380	74	73	75	91	−17.6	4.39	17.1
Shaunavon	Grassy Creek No. 78	1,784	1,714	1,756	1,691	3.8	5.1	344.2
Shellbrook	Shellbrook No. 493	1,510	1,444	1,433	1,230	16.5	3.67	390.3
Sintaluta	Indian Head No. 156	124	119	120	98	22.4	2.7	44.5
Southey	Cupar No. 218	832	804	778	711	9.4	1.56	499.8
Spiritwood	Spiritwood No. 496	966	913	916	911	0.5	2.95	310
Springside	Orkney No. 244	478	502	534	513	4.1	0.68	791
St. Brieux	Lake Lenore No. 399	638	667	590	492	19.9	2.55	231.4
St. Walburg	Frenchman Butte No. 501	591	689	716	672	6.5	2.12	338
Star City	Star City No. 428	374	387	460	428	7.5	0.7	661.1
Stoughton	Tecumseh No. 65	652	649	694	653	6.3	3.41	203.2
Strasbourg	McKillop No. 220	788	800	752	732	2.7	5.7	132
Sturgis	Preeceville No. 334	646	644	620	575	7.8	3.41	181.6
Tisdale	Tisdale No. 427	2,962	3,235	3,180	3,000	6	6.47	491.5
Turtleford	Mervin No. 499	503	496	525	461	13.9	1.69	311.6
Unity	Round Valley No. 410	2,496	2,573	2,389	2,147	11.3	9.77	244.6
Vonda	Grant No. 372	384	384	353	322	9.6	2.86	123.6
Wadena	Lakeview No. 337	1,269	1,288	1,306	1,315	−0.7	2.91	449.5
Wakaw	Fish Creek No. 402	978	922	985	864	14	3.12	315.9
Waldheim	Laird No. 404	1,237	1,213	1,035	868	19.2	1.97	525.5
Wapella	Martin No. 122	278	326	333	311	7.1	2.57	129.8
Watrous	Morris No. 312	1,842	1,900	1,857	1,743	6.5	11.17	166.2
Watson	Lakeside No. 338	707	697	777	719	8.1	2.83	274.7
Wawota	Wawken No. 93	555	543	560	522	7.3	1.24	451
White City	Edenwold No. 158	3,702	3,099	1,894	1,113	70.2	6	315.6
Whitewood	Willowdale No. 153	944	862	950	869	9.3	3.04	312
Wilkie	Tramping Lake No. 380	1,195	1,219	1,301	1,222	6.5	9.48	137.3
Willow Bunch	Willow Bunch No. 42	299	272	286	297	−3.7	0.84	339.2
Wolseley	Wolseley No. 155	852	854	864	782	10.5	5.93	145.6
Wynyard	Big Quill No. 308	1,724	1,798	1,767	1,744	1.3	5.29	334.1
Yellow Grass	Scott No. 98	483	478	440	371	18.6	2.68	164.1
Zealandia	St. Andrews No. 287	75	80	80	90	−11.1	1.38	57.9
Total towns				137,725	127,795	7.8	473.50	290.9

== Gallery ==
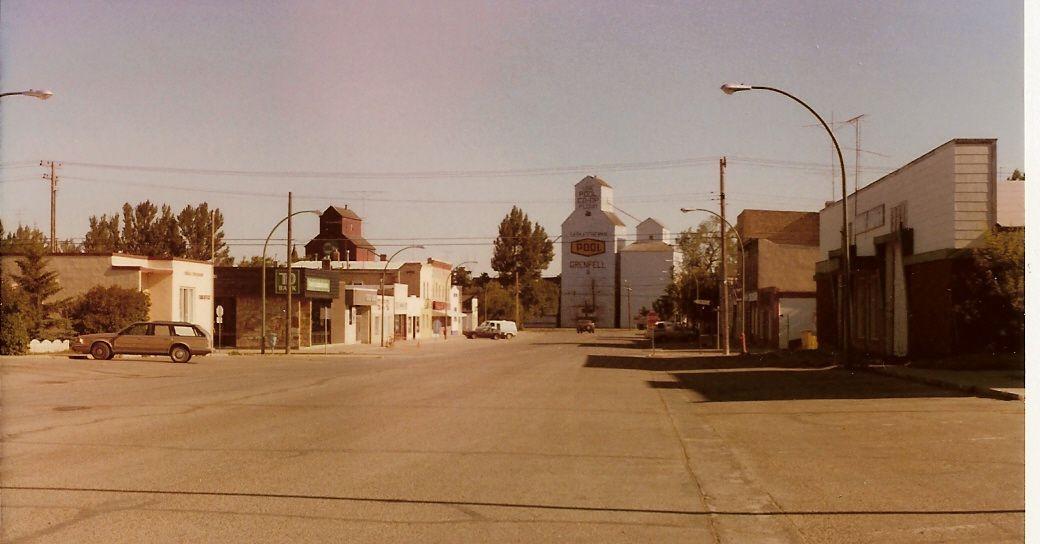
Main Street, Grenfell, 1980. Note grain elevators, from the outset of settlement the predominating feature of prairie towns; now long removed.

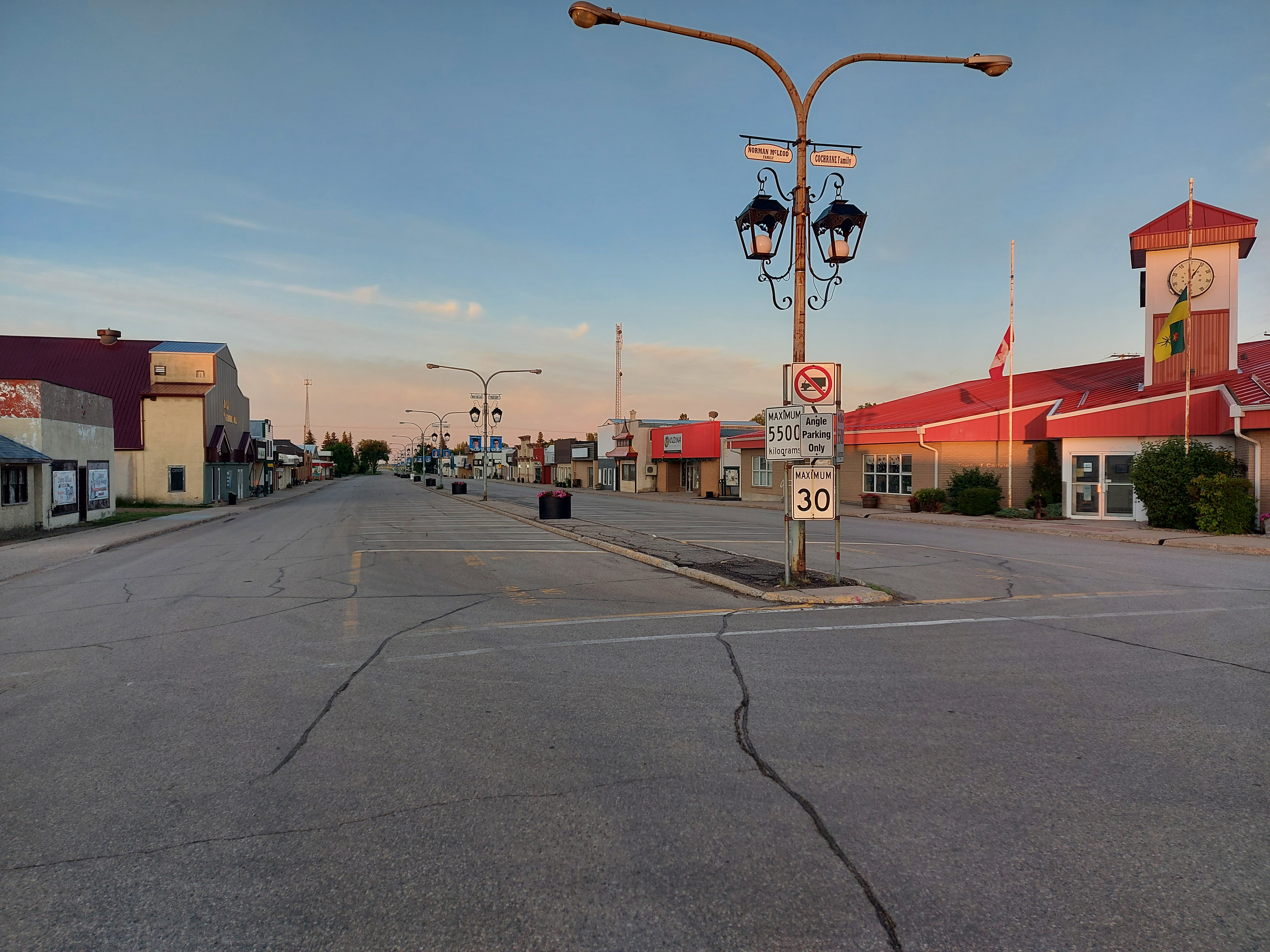
Main Street Carlyle

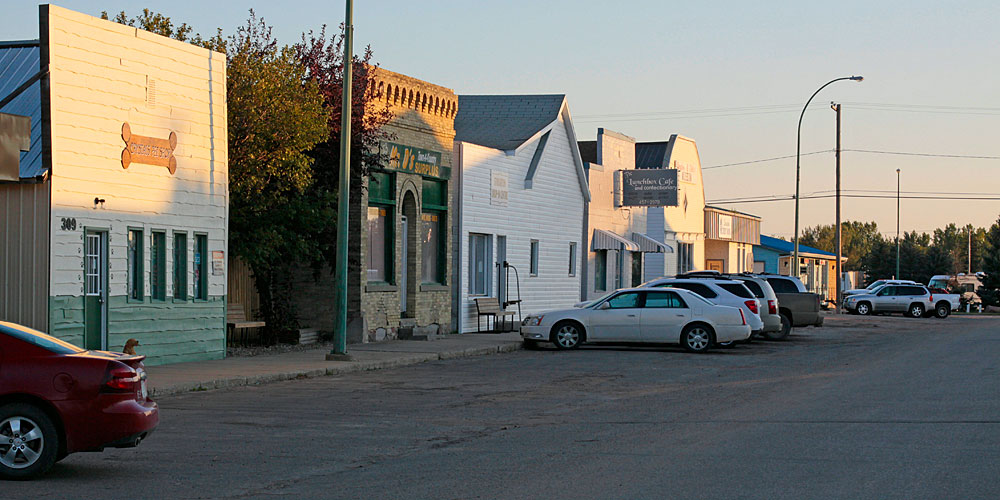
Main Street Stoughton

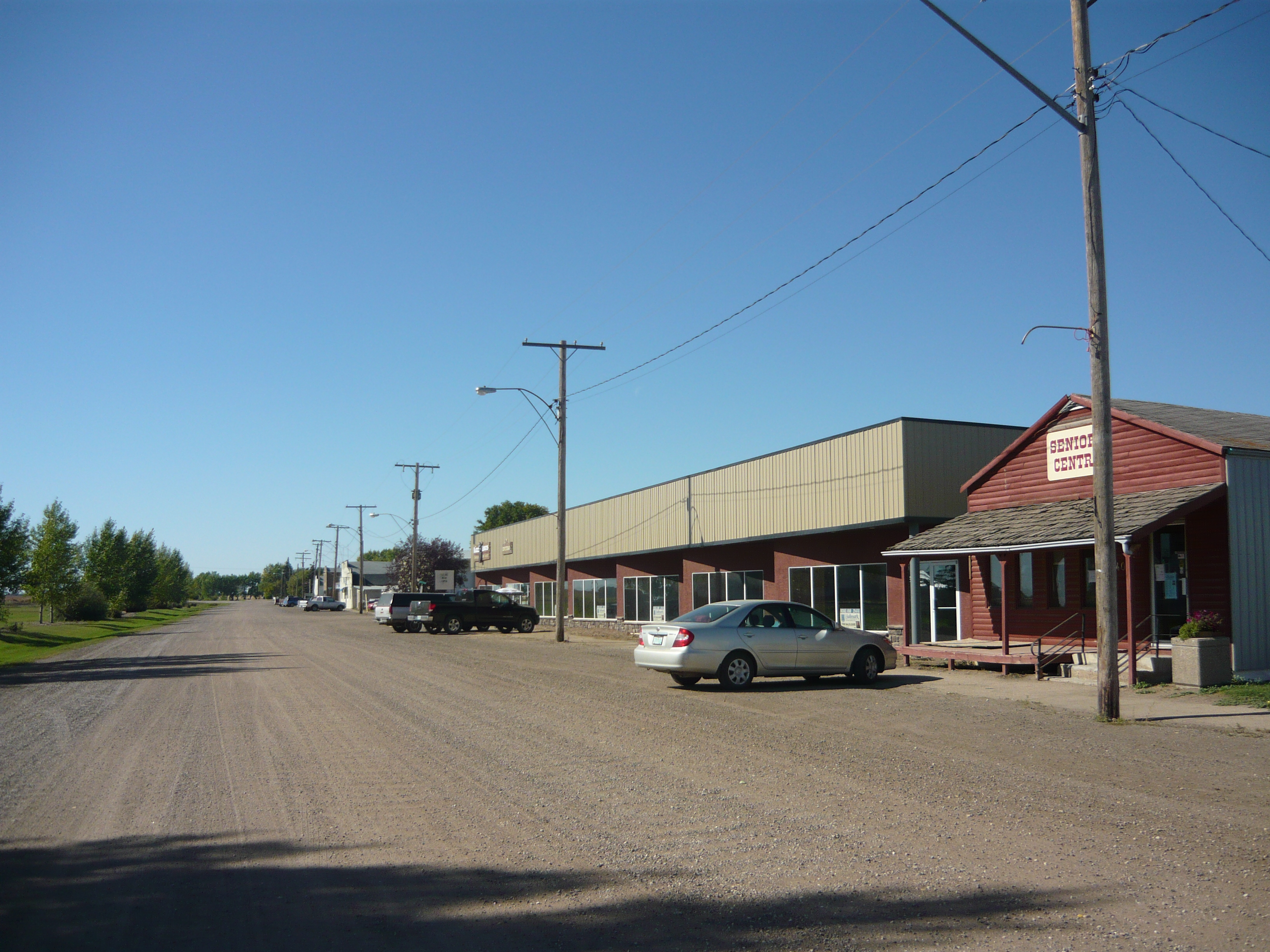
Main Street Aberdeen

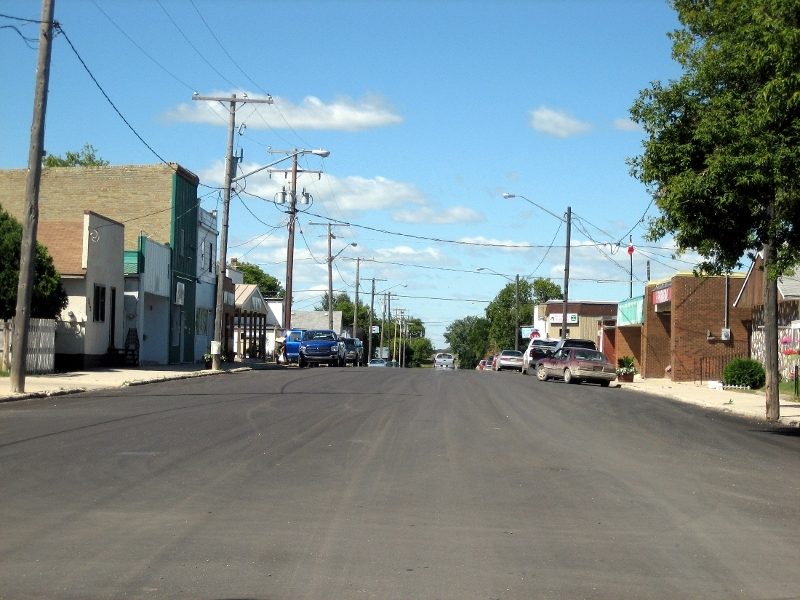
Broadview Main Street c. 2014

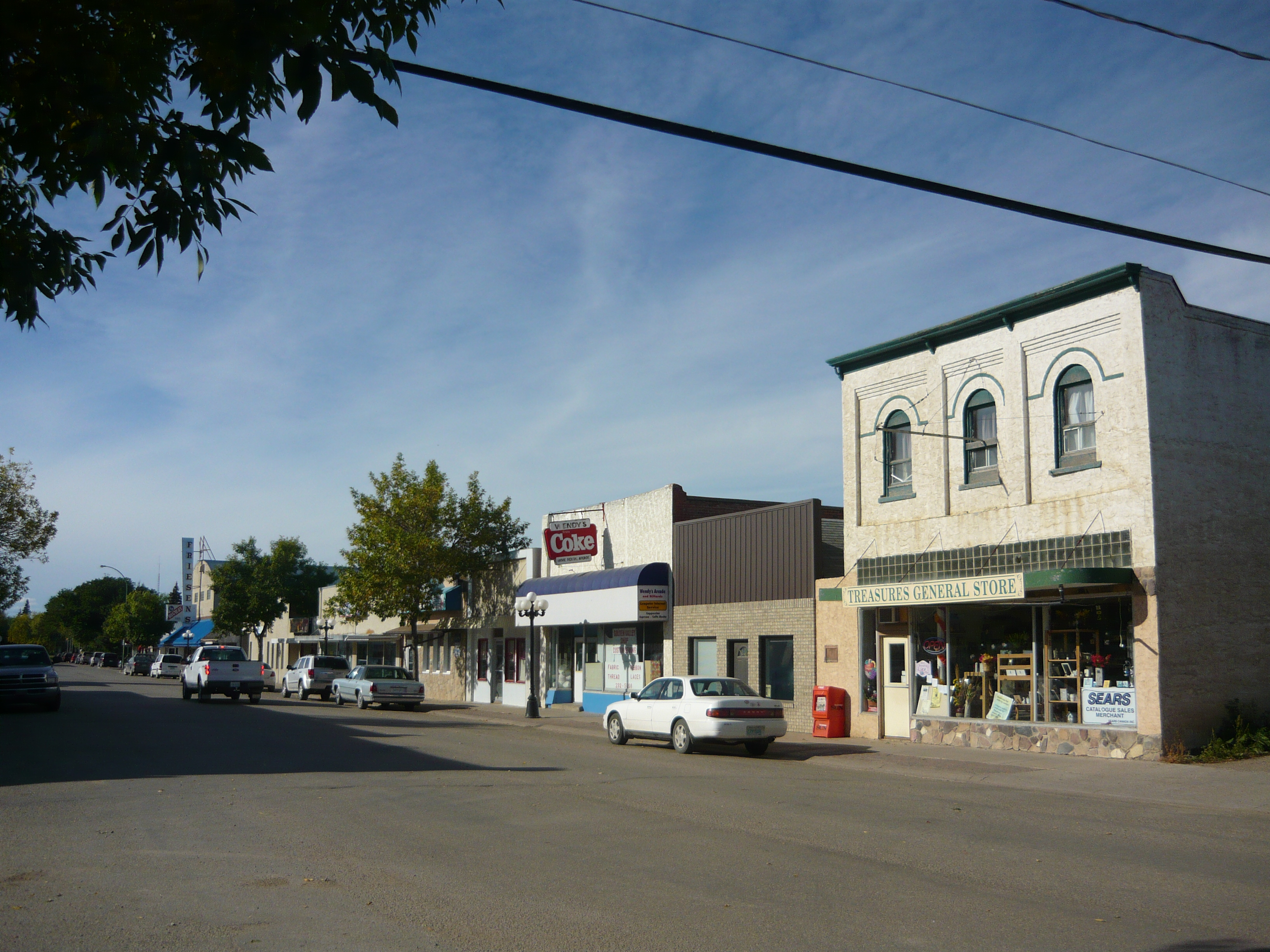
Rosthern business district

== See also ==
- List of communities in Saskatchewan
- List of municipalities in Saskatchewan
