= Martensville =

- City
- City of Martensville
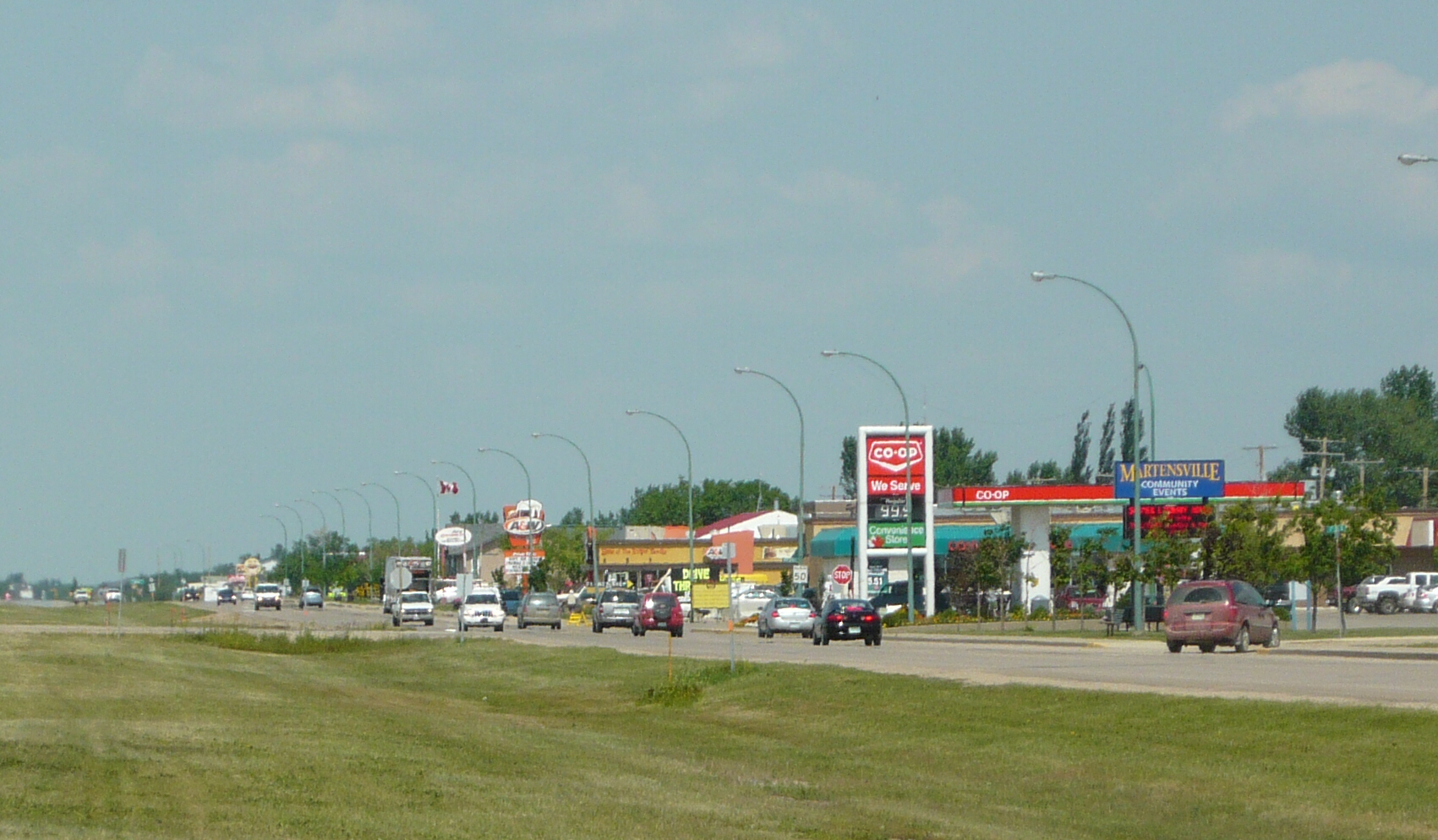
- Martensville's business district Centennial Drive (2009)

- Location within Corman Park No. 344 Location within Saskatchewan
- Coordinates: 52°17′23″N 106°40′00″W
- Country: Canada
- Province: Saskatchewan
- Metropolitan area: Saskatoon
- Rural municipality: Corman Park
- Founded: 1939
- Incorporated (village): 1966
- Incorporated (town): 1969
- Incorporated (city): 2009

Government
  - Governing Body: Martensville City Council
  - Mayor: Kent Muench
  - MLA (Martensville-Blairmore): Jamie Martens (SKP)
  - MP (Carlton Trail—Eagle Creek): Kelly Block (CON)

Area
  - Total: 13.56 km^{2} (5.24 sq mi)

Population (2021)
  - Total: 10,549
  - Density: 1,421.2/km^{2} (3,681/sq mi)
- Time zone: UTC-6 (CST)
- Postal code: S0K 2T0 & S0K 5B0 S0K 2T1 S0K 2T2 S0K 0A2
- Area codes: 306, 639
- Highway: Highway 12
- Website: www.martensville.ca

Martensville is a city located in Saskatchewan, Canada, just 8 kilometres (5.0 mi) north of Saskatoon, 10 kilometres (6.2 mi) west of the city of Warman and 14 kilometres (8.7 mi) southwest of Clarkboro Ferry which crosses the South Saskatchewan River. It is a bedroom community of Saskatoon. It is surrounded by the Rural Municipality of Corman Park No. 344. The community is served by the Saskatoon/Richter Field Aerodrome located immediately west of the city across Highway 12, as well as by Saskatoon's John G. Diefenbaker International Airport, only a few miles to the south.

== History ==
In 1939, Isaac Martens (1887–1987) and his son Dave Martens (1908-1984) purchased land north of Saskatoon. They then sold three small parcels of land to people who wanted to move out of Saskatoon and, as a result, the community of Martensville was created. Many Mennonites who worked in Saskatoon chose to live there to retain connections to the large Mennonite community of the Hague-Osler area.

Martensville was later incorporated as a village in 1966 and as a town three years later in 1969. Sewer and water was established in 1976 with the town experiencing accelerated growth. In 1992, the town was rocked by an alleged satanic sex scandal which made national headlines, also known as the Martensville satanic sex scandal. In 2009, Martensville was incorporated as a city.

== Demographics ==
In the 2021 Census of Population conducted by Statistics Canada, Martensville had a population of 10,549 living in 3,639 of its 3,799 total private dwellings, a change of 9.3% from its 2016 population of 9,655. With a land area of 13.56 km^{2} (5.24 sq mi), it had a population density of 777.9/km^{2} (2,014.9/sq mi) in 2021.

Canada census – Martensville community profile

	2021	2016	2011
Population	10,549 (+9.3% from 2016)	9,645 (25% from 2011)	7,716 (55.0% from 2006)
Land area	13.56 km^{2} (5.24 sq mi)	6.79 km^{2} (2.62 sq mi)	6.23 km^{2} (2.41 sq mi)
Population density	777.9/km^{2} (2,015/sq mi)	1,421.2/km^{2} (3,681/sq mi)	1,239.3/km^{2} (3,210/sq mi)
Median age	33.6 (M: 33.6, F: 33.6)	31.1 (M: 31.1, F: 31.1)	30.0 (M: 30.1, F: 29.8)
Private dwellings	3,799 (total) 3,639 (occupied)	3,337 (total)	2,657 (total)
Median household income	$115,000

References: 2021 2016 2011

=== Ethnicity ===
Panethnic groups in the City of Martensville (2001−2021)
Panethnic group	2021		2016		2011		2006		2001	
Panethnic group	Pop.	%	Pop.	%	Pop.	%	Pop.	%	Pop.	%
European (Note: Statistic includes all persons that did not make up part of a visible minority or an indigenous identity.)	8,765	83.28%	8,415	87.25%	7,165	92.87%	4,735	95.37%	4,095	93.81%
Indigenous	1,185	11.26%	880	9.12%	420	5.44%	225	4.53%	245	5.61%
Southeast Asian (Note: Statistic includes total responses of "Filipino" and "Southeast Asian" under visible minority section on census.)	225	2.14%	175	1.81%	20	0.26%	0	0%	25	0.57%
South Asian	100	0.95%	40	0.41%	20	0.26%	0	0%	0	0%
African	100	0.95%	40	0.41%	0	0%	10	0.2%	0	0%
Latin American	65	0.62%	40	0.41%	0	0%	0	0%	0	0%
East Asian (Note: Statistic includes total responses of "Chinese", "Korean", and "Japanese" under visible minority section on census.)	40	0.38%	40	0.41%	0	0%	0	0%	0	0%
Middle Eastern (Note: Statistic includes total responses of "West Asian" and "Arab" under visible minority section on census.)	0	0%	15	0.16%	0	0%	0	0%	0	0%
Other/multiracial (Note: Statistic includes total responses of "Visible minority, n.i.e." and "Multiple visible minorities" under visible minority section on census.)	35	0.33%	0	0%	30	0.39%	0	0%	10	0.23%
Total responses	10,525	99.77%	9,645	99.9%	7,715	99.99%	4,965	99.94%	4,365	100%
Total population	10,549	100%	9,655	100%	7,716	100%	4,968	100%	4,365	100%
Note: Totals greater than 100% due to multiple origin responses

== Geography ==
Martensville, located between the North Saskatchewan River and South Saskatchewan River, is between 600 meters (2,000 ft) to 700 meters (2,300 ft) above sea level. Martensville is located just north of the moist mixed grasslands area typical of Saskatoon, and locates instead in an ecoregion of aspen parkland. It is located just 20 kilometers (12 mi) north of Saskatoon, and 14 kilometers (8.7 mi) southwest of Clarkboro Ferry, which crosses the South Saskatchewan River. The 10 km distance between Martensville and Warman is the closest between two chartered cities in the province. By comparison, Martensville is approximately 18 km north of downtown Saskatoon, its next closest neighbour.

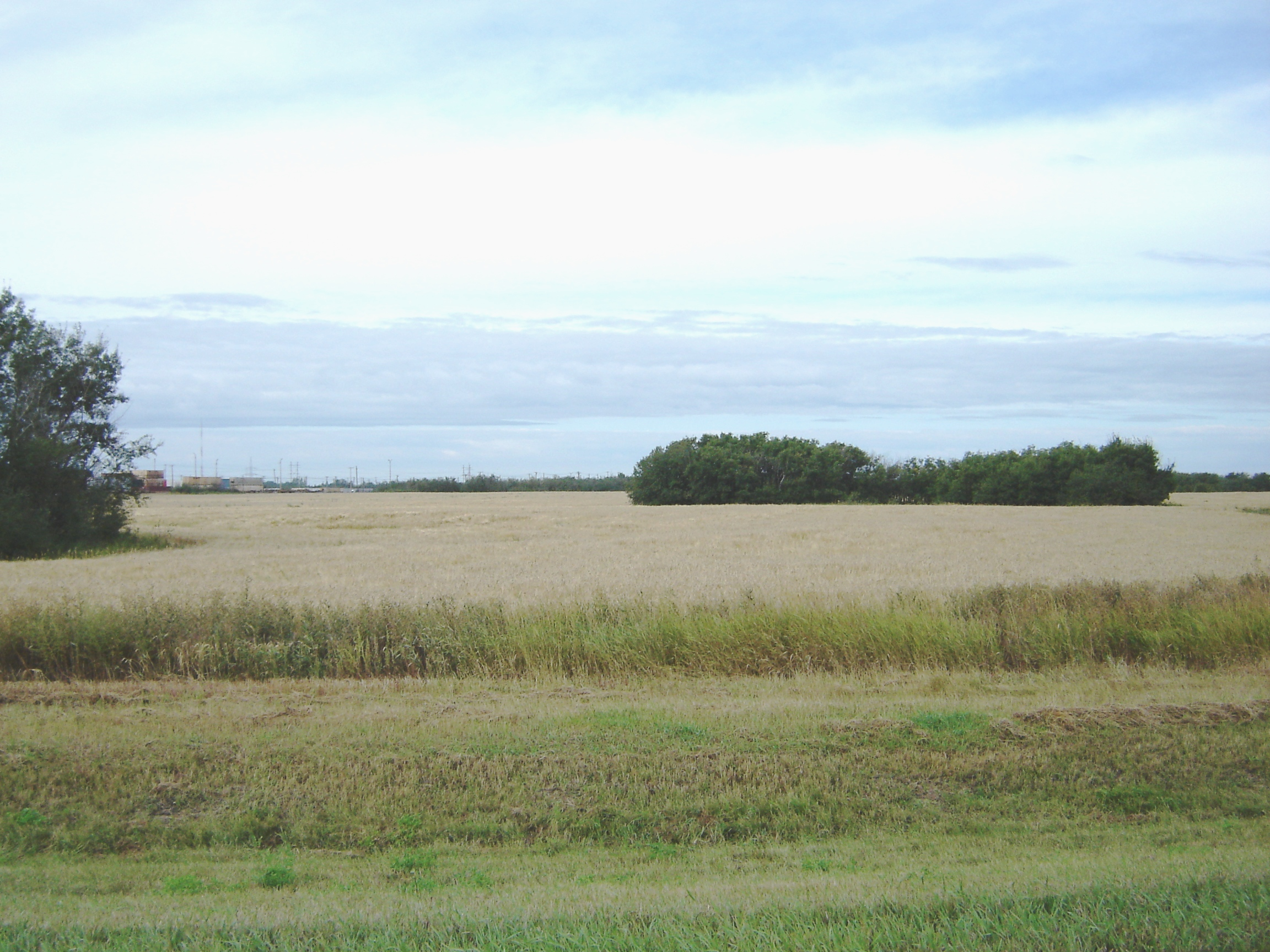
Patches of Aspen trees surrounded by wheat fields in the summer.

Martensville is in a dry-prairie/savanna biome and experiences warm summers and very cold winters. Martensville has four distinct seasons. Average temperatures range from −17 °C in January to 18 °C in July. Martensville is fairly dry; with the summer being the wettest season. It belongs to the continental climate region of Canada which typifies warm summers according to the Köppen climate classification. The geology of the area are sandy plains which resulted from shorelines of glacial lakes and depositions from glacial lakes as the Laurentide Ice Sheet left the area. There are no large lakes in this area due to the sandy soils which drained away melting glacial waters. The lakes in this area are remnants of the South Saskatchewan river channels.

== Government ==
Martensville's local government has a mayor and six councillors, elected on a term of four years. Kent Muench is the current Mayor.

Provincially Martensville is within the Martensville-Blairmore constituency served by their MLA, who is currently Jamie Martens.

Martensville is represented in the House of Commons of Canada by MP of the Carlton Trail—Eagle Creek riding; currently it is held by Kelly Block of the Conservative Party.

The city does not have its own police service and is in contract with the Royal Canadian Mounted Police for protective services along with Corman Park Police Service and the Saskatoon Police Service, who provide additional assistance when needed.

== Education ==
Martensville received its first school in 1953. Martensville is served by three public elementary schools, one Catholic elementary school, and one high school in the Prairie Spirit School Division. Valley Manor Elementary School is located on the south side of Martensville, while Venture Heights Elementary School and the Martensville High School are both located on the north side. Each school has an enrollment of over seven hundred students. In the spring of 2008, CA$698,000 was allocated for portable classrooms at Valley Manor and Venture Heights Schools. A new public K-8 school will be opening for the 2017–2018 school year. Lake Vista Public School will be able to accommodate 450 students and is located in the new Lake Vista neighborhood.

Historically pupils were served by the Halcyonia School District #1237 one-room school house at South West Section 28 township 40 Range 8 W of the 3 meridian, which was established by the historical Rural Municipality number 384. Some pupils may have attended Virtue one-room school house #2616, which was built at a later date at Tsp 38 Rge 6 W of the 3 meridian.

In 2010, Catholic residents in Martensville formed a local Catholic school division which amalgamated with Greater Saskatoon Catholic Schools shortly thereafter. It was revealed on June 23, 2015, that the division's new elementary school in Martensville would be named Holy Mary Catholic School and it opened for students in 2017.

== Points of interest ==
The city has seven lakes that are connected through a series of canals. The lakes and creeks are part of the Opimihaw Creek system. The lakes were created for water retention but are also used for a variety of year-round recreational activities including perch fishing, canoeing, and skating.

The city has an outdoor pool facility that opened in the summer of 2010. The facility includes a six-lane junior olympic-sized pool, a zero-depth entry pool, and a toddler pool. There are four waterslides and several spray features. It has a full-service concession and is right next to the community centre.

Wanuskewin Heritage Park, a Provincial Heritage Property and interpretive centre, is located 5 miles (8.0 km) from Martensville, and the Sutherland Bird Sanctuary is within 10 miles (16 km).

See the article on Saskatoon for additional regional points of interest shared with Martensville.

=== Arts and culture ===
Martensville holds its annual Buster Days festival every June, usually in the first or second week. Buster Days is a 3-day festival that includes a parade, dances, softball, and, as of 2005, a volleyball tournament. Before 2005, a small exhibition took place that offered amusement rides, games, and food. Otherwise, its close proximity to Saskatoon - in particular the SaskTel Centre - allows residents easy access to that city's events and attractions.

== Sports ==
Sports venues in Martensville include a kart racing track (Saskatoon Kart Racers), the North Ridge Centennial Centre, Chrome Dome Park (ball diamonds and soccer pitches and Geransky multipurpose field), Kinsmen Park (tennis, skate park, walking trails, ball diamonds, tobogan hill), North Hills Park, Sport Centre (rink where the Marauders. play hockey and curling rink), aquatic facility and various neighbourhood parks. SaskTel Curling Stadium Martensville opened inside the Martensville Curling Club in 2021, offering live broadcasts from all games played. Adjacent to Kinsmen Park is the Martensville Athletic Pavilion. The Athletic Pavilion is a multipurpose indoor 50,000-square-foot athletic facility. The Athletic Pavilion features various court spaces and multi-purpose rooms, a running track and fitness gym in addition to a reception area and concession.

Martensville also hosts the Martensville Mustangs, who are a part of the Martensville Minor Baseball Association (MMBA), as well as the Martensville Maddogs football team and the high school team Martensville Royals.

The city used to have a small golf course, but in May 2008 it was demolished to make way for new houses and a public swimming pool. Martensville's bowling alley was also closed in 2008, and replaced by a gym in late 2009. In the summer of 2008, the former bowling alley was used as filming locations for the second season of the Canadian television show, Rabbit Falls.

== Infrastructure ==
Several major trucking routes radiate north from Saskatoon. Idylwyld Drive North splits into Highway 11 (Louis Riel Trail) to Prince Albert via Warman, and Highway 12 to Blaine Lake via Martensville; 3 km north of the end of the Highway 16 concurrency, exiting to North Battleford and ultimately Edmonton, accessible directly by an 11 km journey on gravel roads, or 24 km if one wishes to stay on pavement via Highway 305.

Martensville is located about 9 miles (14 km) from the Saskatoon John G. Diefenbaker International Airport.

Martensville and Warman are the only Saskatchewan cities without a full hospital; the closest hospital for both cities is Saskatoon City Hospital.

== Media ==
Founded in 2007, Martensville is serviced by the weekly local newspaper, The Martensville Messenger. The Clark's Crossing Gazette, owned by MLA Terry Jenson who represents the electoral district of Martensville-Warman, also delivers to Martensville and Warman residents. Martensville shares other print, radio, and television media with its larger neighbour, Saskatoon. Martensville is currently one of only two cities in Saskatchewan without a local radio station, the other being Warman.

== See also ==
- List of communities in Saskatchewan
