= Rural Municipality of Blaine Lake No. 434 =

Rural municipality in Saskatchewan, Canada

Blaine Lake No. 434
- Rural municipality
- Rural Municipality of Blaine Lake No. 434
- Location of the RM of Blaine Lake No. 434 in Saskatchewan
- Coordinates: 52.827°N 106.780°W
- Country: Canada
- Province: Saskatchewan
- Census division: 16
- SARM division: 5
- Formed: December 9, 1912

Government
  - Reeve: William Chalmers
  - Governing body: RM of Blaine Lake No. 434 Council
  - Administrator: Jennifer Gutknecht
  - Office location: Blaine Lake

Area (2016)
  - Land: 799.69 km^{2} (308.76 sq mi)

Population (2016)
  - Total: 291
  - Density: 0.4/km^{2} (1.0/sq mi)
- Time zone: CST
  - Summer (DST): CST
- Area codes: 306 and 639

The Rural Municipality of Blaine Lake No. 434 (2016 population: 291) is a rural municipality (RM) in the Canadian province of Saskatchewan within Census Division No. 16 and SARM Division No. 5. The RM extends east to the North Saskatchewan River and north to the village of Marcelin.

== History ==
The RM of Blaine Lake No. 434 incorporated as a rural municipality on December 9, 1912.

The story of Sgt John Wilson: One of Canada's most sensational murders took place close to Blaine Lake in 1917. The only Royal Canadian Mounted Police officer ever to be hanged for murder, Sgt John Wilson killed his wife, Polly Wilson, and his unborn child, to marry Jessie Patterson of Blaine Lake. They wed two days after his wife's murder. Polly Wilson had travelled to Canada from Scotland, leaving behind two children, and was pregnant with a third when she was killed. Her body was discovered in a culvert near Waldheim.

== Geography ==
=== Communities and localities ===
The following urban municipalities are surrounded by the RM.

Towns

- Blaine Lake

Villages

- Marcelin

== Blaine Lakes IBA ==
The Blaine Lakes (SK 082) Important Bird Area (IBA) of Canada covers the saline Blaine Lakes and an area of 130.51 km^{2} (50.39 sq mi). The Blaine Lakes consist of two bodies of water that are mostly within the RM of Blaine Lake. The western end of the southern lake is in the neighbouring RM of Redberry No. 435. The nearest communities are Blaine Lake and Krydor and access is from Highway 40. The lakes are shallow and depend on run off from intermittent creeks. During dry years, water levels drop significantly and extensive mudflats form. The IBA is important habitat for birds such as the rusty blackbird, sanderling, and whooping crane.

== Petrofka Recreation Site ==
Petrofka Recreation Site (52.6578°N 106.8586°W) is a small, free provincially owned campground and recreation area on the west bank of the North Saskatchewan River in the RM of Blaine Lake. The park, which is accessed from Highway 12, was founded in 1991 and covers an area of 62 acres. It was named after the nearby Doukhobor village of Petrofka. The village was established in 1899 and then abandoned in 1929. There are two historical sites at the park, Petrofka Springs and Petrofka Ferry Historical Monument. The Petrofka Bridge replaced the ferry in 1962, and the springs are a natural spring in the area.

== Demographics ==
Population history (1981–2016)
Year	Pop.	±%
1981	527	—
1986	483	−8.3%
1991	423	−12.4%
1996	374	−11.6%
2001	325	−13.1%
2006	302	−7.1%
2011	288	−4.6%
2016	291	+1.0%
Source: Statistics Canada via Saskatchewan Bureau of Statistics

In the 2021 Census of Population conducted by Statistics Canada, the RM of Blaine Lake No. 434 had a population of 301 living in 130 of its 142 total private dwellings, a change of 7.1% from its 2016 population of 281. With a land area of 771.86 km^{2} (298.02 sq mi), it had a population density of 0.4/km^{2} (1.0/sq mi) in 2021.

In the 2016 Census of Population, the RM of Blaine Lake No. 434 recorded a population of 291 living in 114 of its 128 total private dwellings, a 1% change from its 2011 population of 288. With a land area of 799.69 km^{2} (308.76 sq mi), it had a population density of 0.4/km^{2} (0.9/sq mi) in 2016.

== Government ==
The RM of Blaine Lake No. 434 is governed by an elected municipal council and an appointed administrator that meets on the second Tuesday of every month. The reeve of the RM is William Chalmers while its administrator is Jennifer Gutknecht. The RM's office is located in Blaine Lake.

== See also ==
- List of rural municipalities in Saskatchewan
