= Petrofka Bridge =

Bridge in Canada

- Coordinates: 52°38′43″N 106°50′36″W
- Carries: Two lanes of Highway 12
- Crosses: North Saskatchewan River
- Locale: South of Blaine Lake, Saskatchewan, Canada
- Official name: Petrofka Bridge

History
- Construction start: 1960
- Construction end: 1963
- Opened: September 26, 1963

Location
- Interactive map of Petrofka Bridge

The Petrofka Bridge is a Canadian bridge that spans the North Saskatchewan River south of Blaine Lake, Saskatchewan. The bridge was named after Petrofka, a Doukhobor village near the bridge site. The bridge replaced the Petrofka and Laird ferry crossings that were near the bridge.

== See also ==
- List of crossings of the North Saskatchewan River
- List of bridges in Canada
