= Langham, Saskatchewan =

Town in Saskatchewan, Canada

Langham
- Town
- Town of Langham
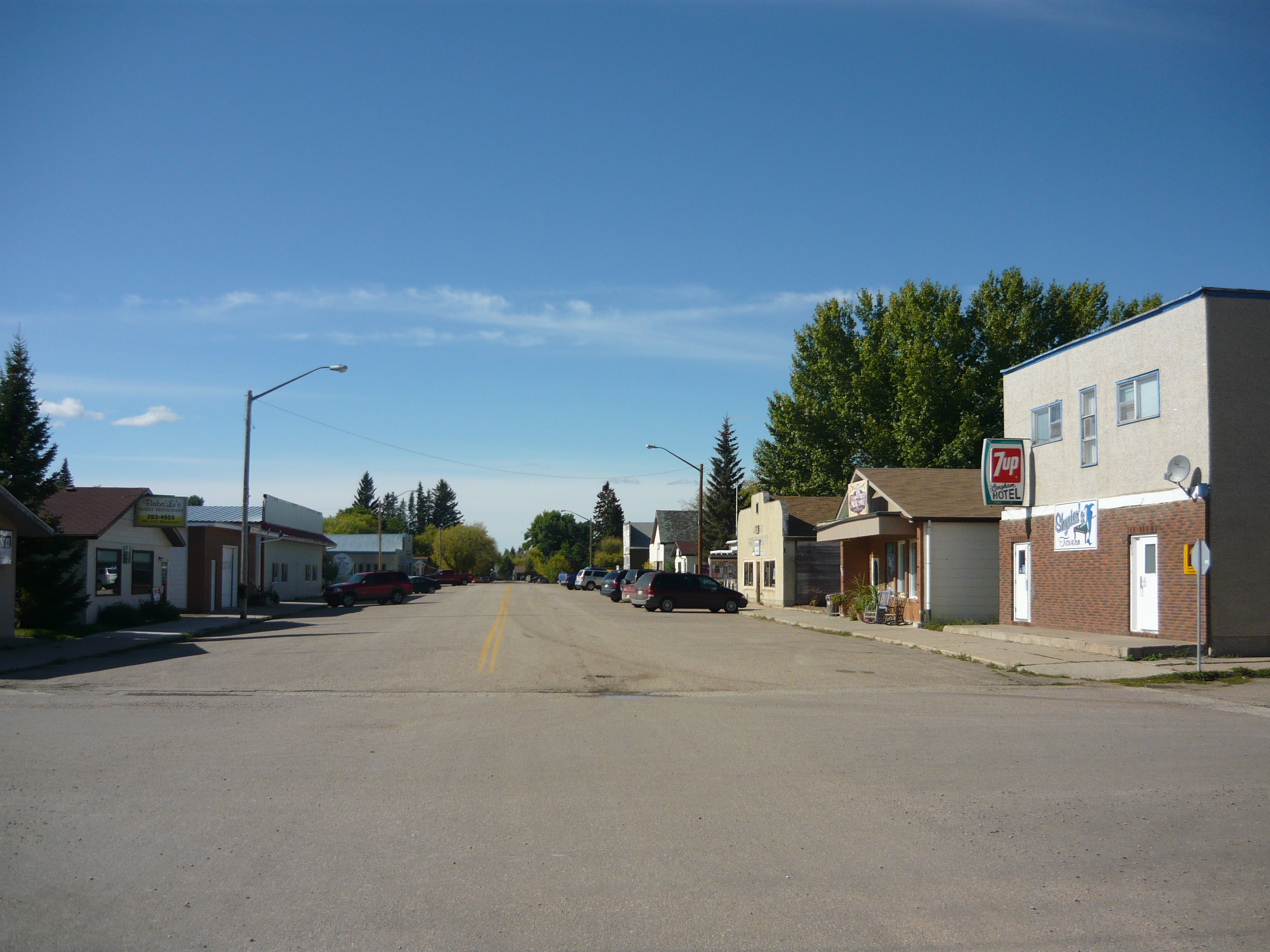
- Main Street

- Location within Corman Park No. 344 Location within Saskatchewan
- Coordinates: 52.37°N 106.97°W
- Country: Canada
- Province: Saskatchewan
- Founded: 1904
- Post office established: 1905-09-01
- Town Incorporated: 1907

Government
  - Mayor: Randy Kary
  - Governing body: Langham Town Council

Area
  - Land: 4.27 km^{2} (1.65 sq mi)

Population (2021)
  - Total: 1,518
  - Density: 355.1/km^{2} (920/sq mi)
- Time zone: CST
- Postal code: S0K 2L0
- Area code: 306
- Highways: Highway 16
- Website: Official website

Langham is a town in Saskatchewan, Canada. It is on Highway 16, surrounded by the Rural Municipality of Corman Park No. 344, and about 35 kilometres (22 mi) northwest of the city of Saskatoon. The 2011 census reported a population of 1,290, with 489 homes in the community.

Originally, the area was primarily settled by Mennonites. Langham was named after E. Langham, a purchasing agent for the Canadian National Railway. Langham was founded in 1904 with the building of a rail line between Saskatoon and Edmonton, Alberta. Langham was declared a village in 1906, and became a town in 1907.

== Schools ==
There are two public schools serving the children of Langham and area. Approximately 150 Grades K to 5 students attend Langham Elementary School, while approximately 210 Grades 6 to 12 students attend Walter W Brown High School. Both schools are part of Prairie Spirit School Division, which includes communities that surround the city of Saskatoon. Li'l Vikings Preschool opened in 2017, serving pre-school aged children.

== Economy ==
The town's economy is based on commuters to the nearby city, and on agriculture. There are a number of local businesses, which include a general car maintenance and repair shop, insurance services, an autobody repair shop, a financial institution, a restaurant, daycares, gas bar, and income tax services.

== Entertainment and attractions ==
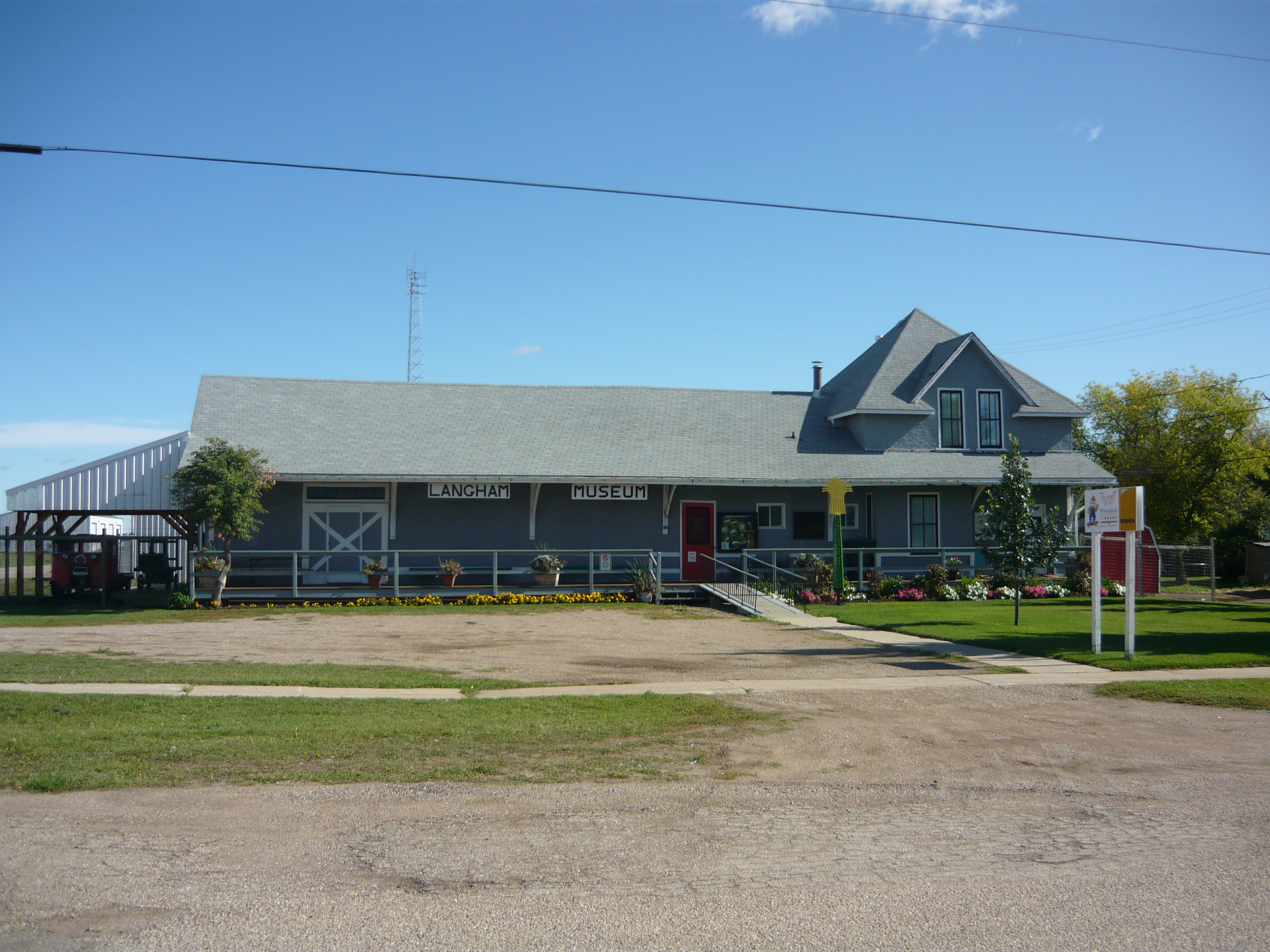
Heritage Museum and Library in former CNR station

Langham is home to a branch of the Wheatland Regional Library, which is open throughout the year, offering story time programs for young children.

The Langham & District Heritage Village & Museum is open from early May to September 30. The museum's purpose is to showcase and preserve the artifacts that show the history and development of Langham and District. River Valley RV Park has 31 fully serviced campsites and is located on the edge of Langham. River Ridge Trails are approximately 5km north of Langham, and offers walking and biking trails and groomed ski trails.

== Activities ==
The Summer Activities Program occurs around town from early July until late August. Sporting, crafting, and social events happen throughout the summer. Community sport activities include hockey, curling, figure skating, soccer, softball, and slow-pitch. Langham is also home to a splash pad.

== Churches ==
Langham offers one of the highest numbers of churches per capita in Canada. Churches in Langham include the St. Mark Catholic Church, Knox United Church, Langham Mennonite Fellowship (formerly Zoar Mennonite Church), Langham Evangelical Bible Church, First Sask. Lutheran Church, and the Emmanuel Church.

== Demographics ==
In the 2021 Census of Population conducted by Statistics Canada, Langham had a population of 1,518 living in 554 of its 589 total private dwellings, a change of 1.5% from its 2016 population of 1,496. With a land area of 4.27 km^{2} (1.65 sq mi), it had a population density of 355.5/km^{2} (920.7/sq mi) in 2021.

Canada census – Langham community profile

| | 2021 | 2016 | 2011 |
| Population | 1,518 (+1.5% from 2016) | 1,496 (16.0% from 2011) | 1,290 (15.2% from 2006) |
| Land area | 4.27 km^{2} (1.65 sq mi) | 3.99 km^{2} (1.54 sq mi) | 3.98 km^{2} (1.54 sq mi) |
| Population density | 355.1/km^{2} (920/sq mi) | 374.9/km^{2} (971/sq mi) | 324.4/km^{2} (840/sq mi) |
| Median age | 35.2 (M: 35.6, F: 35.2) | 36.7 (M: 36.1, F: 37.3) | 36.3 (M: 36.1, F: 36.8) |
| Private dwellings | 589 (total) 554 (occupied) | 568 (total) | 489 (total) |
| Median household income | $95,000 |

References: 2021 2016 2011

== Geography ==
Communities that surround Langham include Dalmeny, Borden, Martensville, Warman, Saskatoon, and Sarilia Country Estates, located approximately 6 miles north, along the South Saskatchewan River.

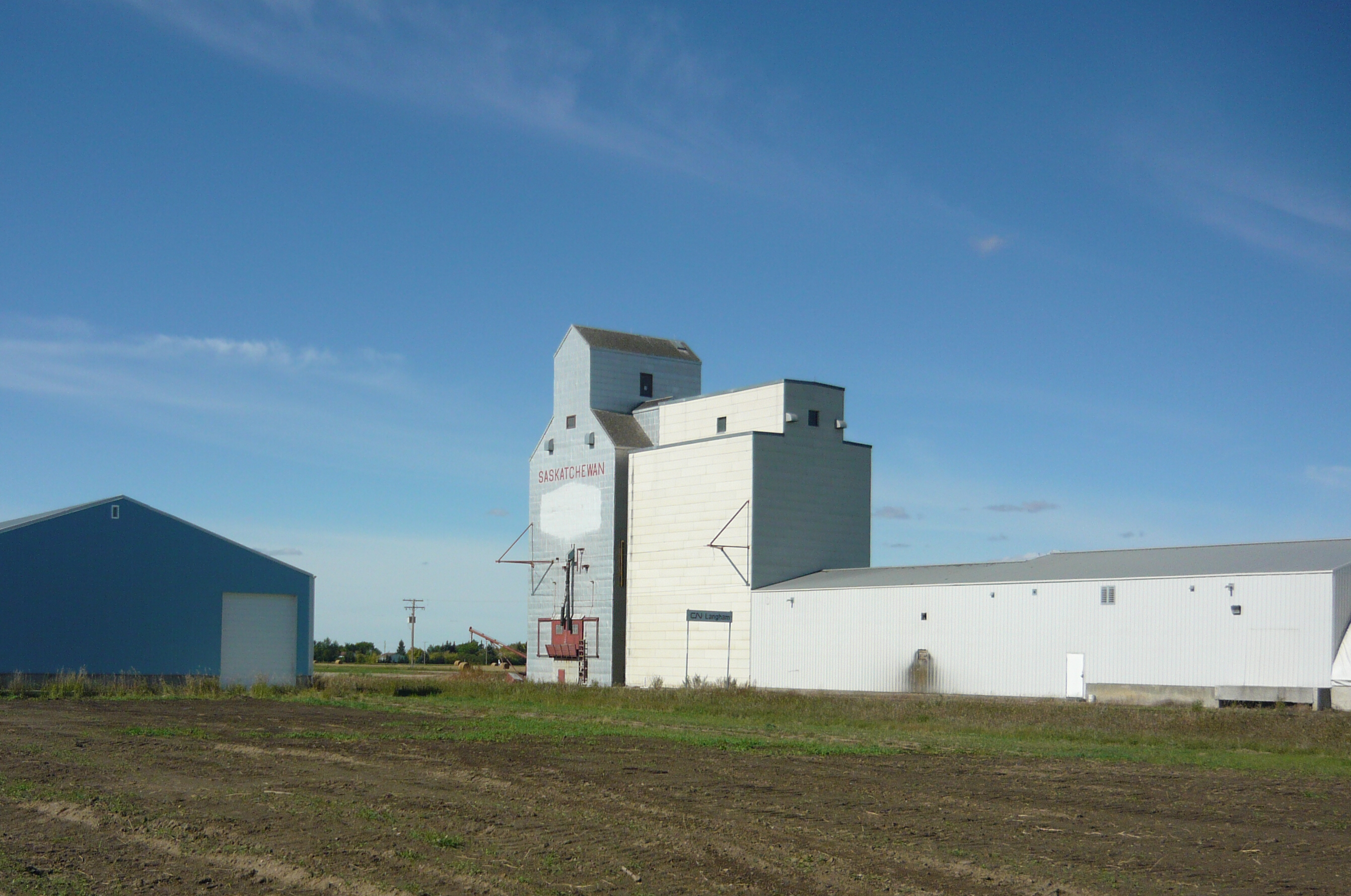
Grain elevator

== See also ==
- List of towns in Saskatchewan
