= Aberdeen, Saskatchewan =

Town in Saskatchewan, Canada

Aberdeen
- Town
- Town of Aberdeen
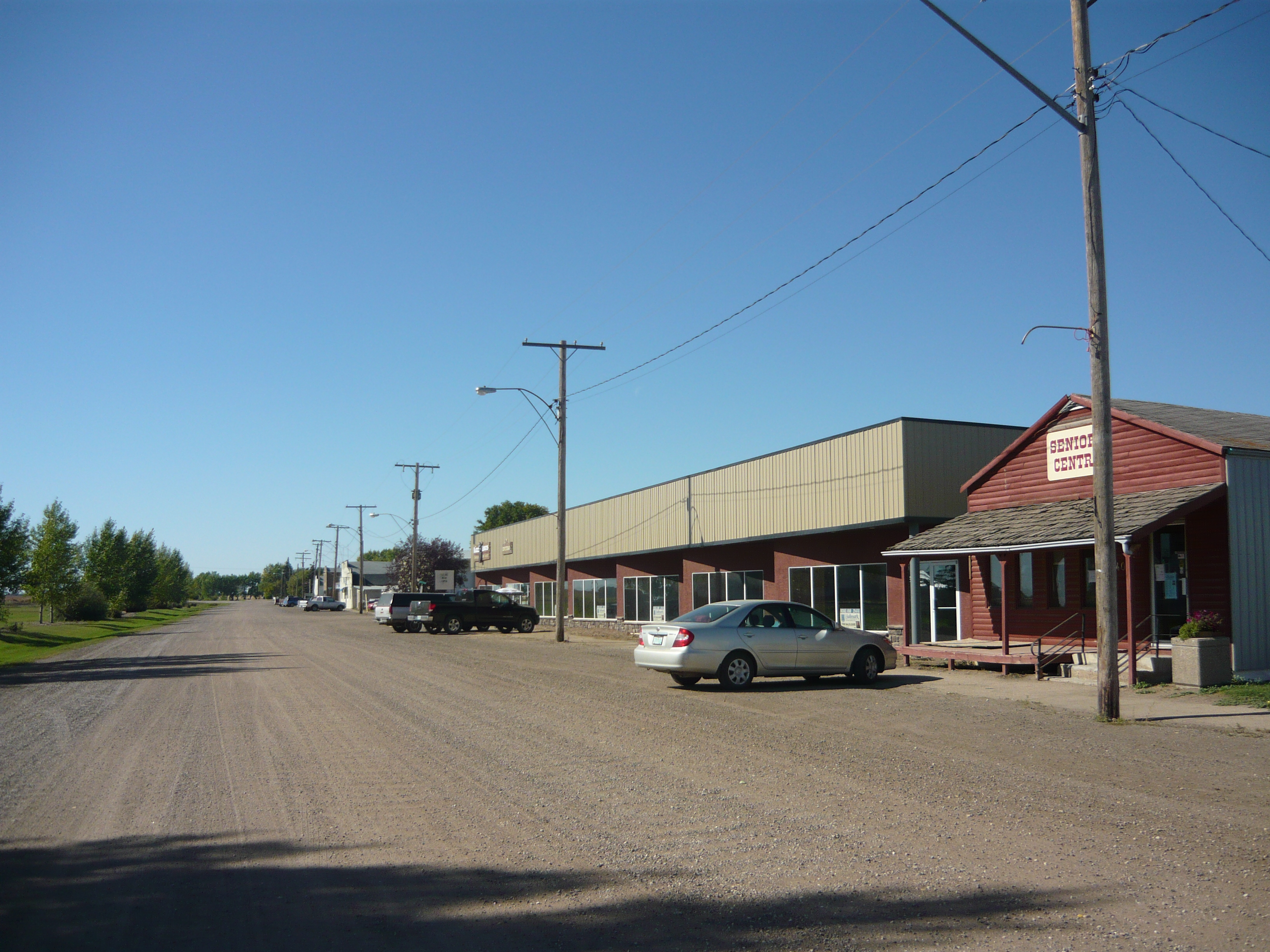
- Main Street

- Location within Saskatchewan Location within Aberdeen No. 373
- Coordinates: 52°19′34″N 106°17′30″W
- Country: Canada
- Province: Saskatchewan
- Rural municipality: Aberdeen No. 373
- Post office founded: 1905-04-01
- Incorporated (village): 1907
- Named for: Lady Aberdeen

Government
  - Mayor: Ryan White
  - CAO: Susan Thompson
  - Governing body: Aberdeen Town Council

Area
  - Total: 1.95 km^{2} (0.75 sq mi)

Population (2016)
  - Total: 716
  - Density: 318.8/km^{2} (826/sq mi)
- Time zone: CST
- Postal code: S0K 0A0
- Area code: 306
- Website: www.aberdeen.ca

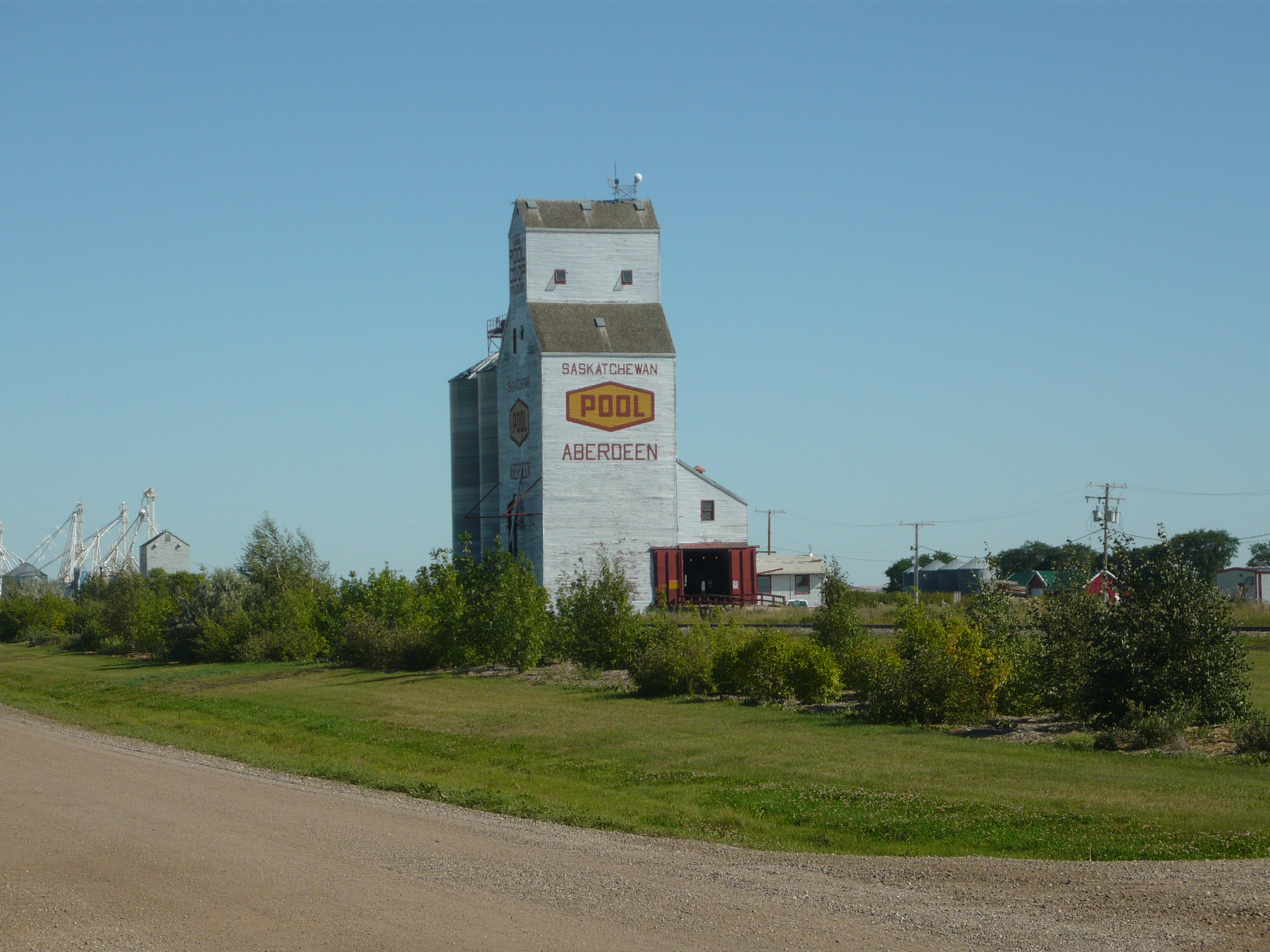
Grain elevator at Aberdeen

Aberdeen is a town in Saskatchewan, Canada. Located 18 minutes north-east of Saskatoon, it has a population of 716 people.

== History ==
Aberdeen was first settled by immigrants of Russian, English, Scottish, and Ukrainian descent in the 1890s to 1900s. In particular, these initial settlers included people born in Eastern or Atlantic Canada, largely of English or Scottish ancestry, along with Ukrainian immigrants (1898–1899) and Mennonites from Manitoba (1901).

Originally named Dueck, it was organized as the hamlet of Aberdeen in 1904. It was named in honour of Ishbel Hamilton-Gordon, Marchioness of Aberdeen and Temair, who founded the National Council of Women of Canada during her time as viceregal consort, 1893–1898. In 1904, the Canadian Northern Railway reached the town. By 1908, the railway had become critical for the sale of wheat, with 120 rail cars of hard wheat shipped out that year.

Business on Main Street peaked in the early 1930s, until it was largely destroyed by fire in 1937.

== Demographics ==
In the 2021 Census of Population conducted by Statistics Canada, Aberdeen had a population of 716 living in 255 of its 264 total private dwellings, a change of 8.2% from its 2016 population of 662. With a land area of 1.96 km^{2} (0.76 sq mi), it had a population density of 365.3/km^{2} (946.1/sq mi) in 2021.

Canada census – Aberdeen community profile

	2021	2016	2011
Population	716 (+8.2% from 2016)	622 (3.8% from 2011)	599 (13.7% from 2006)
Land area	1.96 km^{2} (0.76 sq mi)	1.95 km^{2} (0.75 sq mi)	1.95 km^{2} (0.75 sq mi)
Population density	364.6/km^{2} (944/sq mi)	318.8/km^{2} (826/sq mi)	307.0/km^{2} (795/sq mi)
Median age	34 (M: 34, F: 34)	34.0 (M: 33.9, F: 34.2)	34.4 (M: 33.9, F: 34.6)
Private dwellings	264 (total) 255 (occupied)	254 (total)	227 (total)
Median household income	$95,000	$N/A

References: 2021 2016 2011

== Infrastructure ==
=== Aberdeen Rec Complex ===
The Aberdeen Recreation Complex (ARC) finished construction and opened for business in the fall of 2005. The ARC is home to the AMHA Aberdeen Flames, and the Knights Senior Hockey Club. The Complex also has a professional size rink, training rink, concession and lounge, fitness centre, and meeting rooms.

=== Farm in the Dell ===
Farm in the Dell is a community-based organization supporting people with disabilities in a rural farm-like setting through residential and vocational opportunities. It currently operates one group home providing 10 residential spaces and a day program for ten people. On June 1, 2018, the Farm in the Dell celebrated the development of a five-space group home, a two-space supervised independent living program and an expansion to the day program space. The Government of Saskatchewan provided more than $525,000 in annual funding to this initiative, bringing annual funding for Farm in the Dell to more than $1.4 million.

=== Water supply ===
SaskWater purchases water from the city of Saskatoon and then sells the water to the town of Aberdeen, which in turn sells it to local residents. This is facilitated through the use of a $4M pipeline that was completed in 2010.

== See also ==
- List of communities in Saskatchewan
- List of francophone communities in Saskatchewan
- List of towns in Saskatchewan
