= Hepburn, Saskatchewan =

Town in Saskatchewan, Canada

Hepburn
- Town
- Town of Hepburn
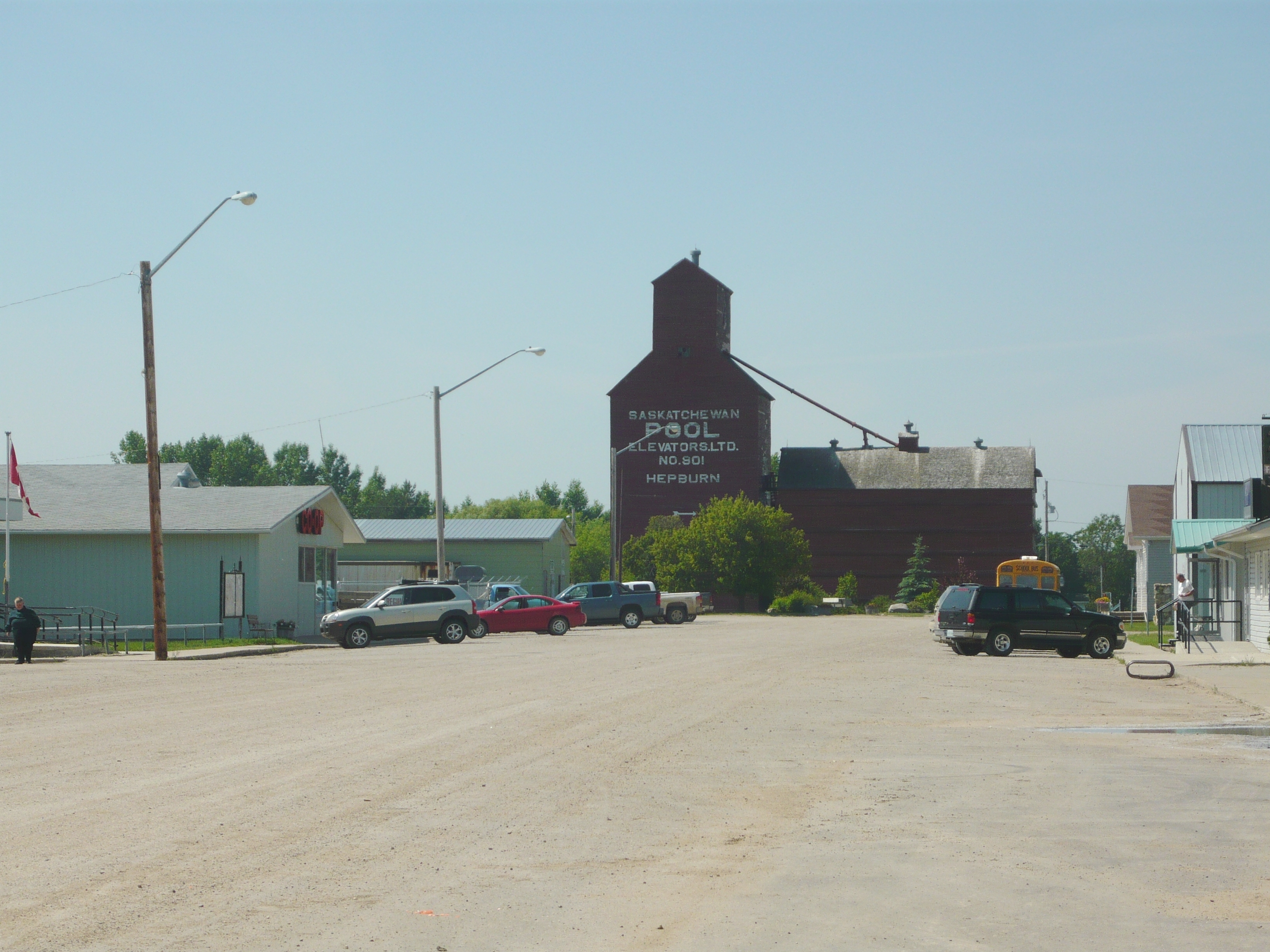
- Main Street (2010)

- Location of Hepburn in Saskatchewan
- Coordinates: 52°31′32″N 106°43′50″W
- Country: Canada
- Province: Saskatchewan
- Census division: 15
- Rural Municipality: Laird No. 404
- Post office established: 1901
- Village: July 5, 1919
- Town: October 24, 2012

Government
  - MLA: Randy Weekes
  - Mayor: Erica Baerwald

Area
  - Total: 1.02 km^{2} (0.39 sq mi)

Population (2011)
  - Total: 562
  - Density: 551/km^{2} (1,430/sq mi)
- Time zone: UTC-6 (CST)
- Postal code: S0K 1Z0
- Area code: 306
- Highways: Highway 12; Highway 375

Hepburn is a town in Saskatchewan, Canada, approximately 45 kilometres north of Saskatoon.

== History ==
Hepburn was settled in the early 20th century as a railroad station. Connection made the community grow overnight and many people moved to the area. Before the 1930s the population of Hepburn had reached over 800 people. In the 1930s, the area was affected by both the Great Depression and a huge drought affecting most of Western Canada. Many of Hepburn's residents and farmers left the area. By the end of the decade, the population was less than 300.

In the 1940s, the community sent over 60 men to serve in World War II. After the war, Hepburn started to grow, and new homes were built. In 1989, the province shut down the railroad line, stranding three grain elevators. Like most Saskatchewan grain elevators, two were torn down but one remained, being converted into a museum about the history of Hepburn and of Saskatchewan.

== Demographics ==
In the 2021 Census of Population conducted by Statistics Canada, Hepburn had a population of 784 living in 268 of its 276 total private dwellings, a change of 14% from its 2016 population of 688. With a land area of 1.14 km^{2} (0.44 sq mi), it had a population density of 687.7/km^{2} (1,781.2/sq mi) in 2021.

Canada census – Hepburn community profile

	2021	2011
Population	784 (+14.0% from 2016)	562 (6.0% from 2006)
Land area	1.14 km^{2} (0.44 sq mi)	1.02 km^{2} (0.39 sq mi)
Population density	689.4/km^{2} (1,786/sq mi)	548.4/km^{2} (1,420/sq mi)
Median age	33.2 (M: 33.2, F: 33.2)
Private dwellings	276 (total) 268 (occupied)	215 (total)
Median household income	$92,000

References: 2021 2011

== Education ==
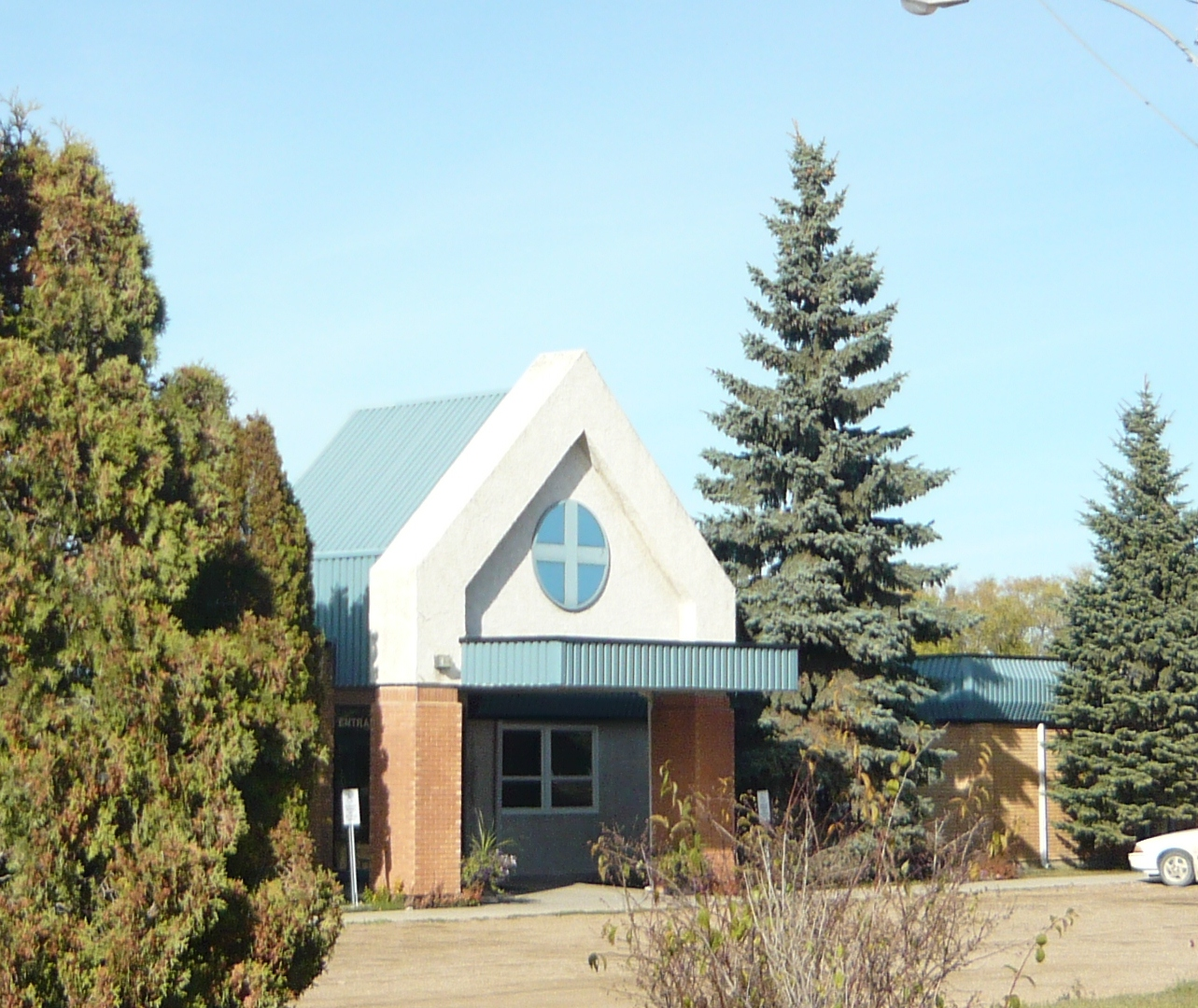
Bethany College (2010)

Hepburn was home to a small Bible college called Bethany College; before it closed in May 2015. Hepburn is also home to Hepburn School (elementary and high school), which celebrated its 75th anniversary in 2001.

== Attractions ==
- Hepburn Museum of Wheat, a grain elevator built by Saskatchewan Wheat Pool in 1928 at the end of main street along the Canadian National Railway. It now stands as a museum that depicts the history of the Saskatchewan Wheat Pool, the Canadian National Railway and farmer.

== See also ==
- List of towns in Saskatchewan
