= Hague, Saskatchewan =

Town in Saskatchewan, Canada

Hague
- Town
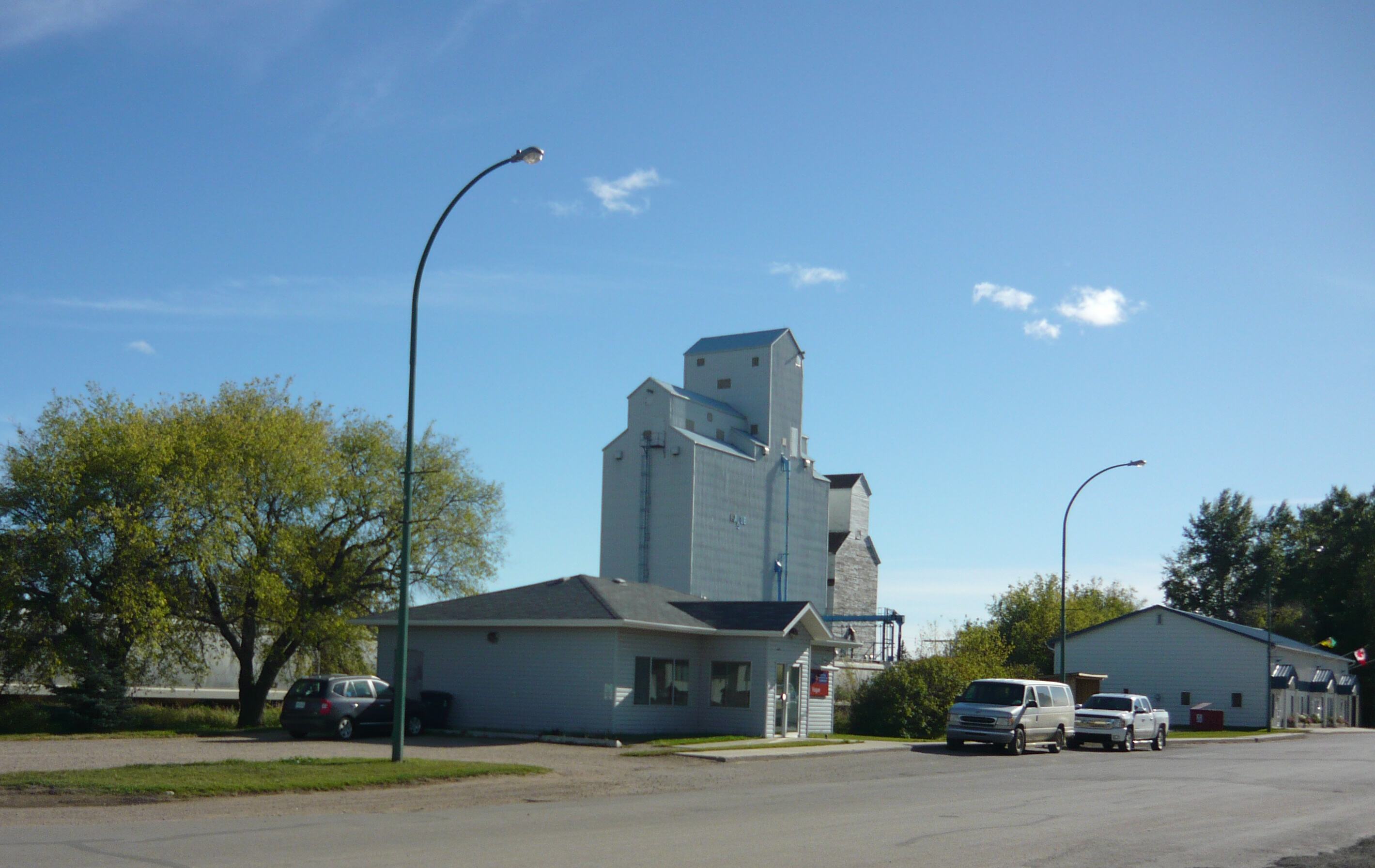
- Post Office on Railway Street

- Location of Hague in Saskatchewan Hague (Canada)
- Coordinates: 52.50°N 106.42°W
- Country: Canada
- Province: Saskatchewan
- Village Incorporated: 1903
- Town Incorporated: 1991

Government
  - Mayor: Patricia Wagner
  - Governing body: Hague Town Council

Area
  - Land: 1.08 km^{2} (0.42 sq mi)

Population (2016)
  - Total: 874
  - Density: 809.2/km^{2} (2,096/sq mi)
- Time zone: CST
- Postal code: S0K 1X0
- Area code: 306
- Highways: Highway 11
- Website: Official Site

Hague is a small rural town in Saskatchewan, Canada, located about 47 km (29 mi) north of Saskatoon along Highway 11. Hague was established in the late nineteenth century as a Mennonite community farming the fertile land in the area.

Hague is growing due to its relatively low cost of living compared to Saskatoon. However, the town's connection to the farming community remains strong. It has a school, arena (with hockey and curling), grocery store, hardware store, Credit Union, post office, one restaurant, two gas stations, and a vehicle dealership. Construction on Highway 11 North was completed July 2011, twinning the Highway between Hague and Saskatoon.

== History ==
Hague was first settled by farmers in the late 1800s and early 1900s.

The community was first incorporated as a village in 1903. It was later reincorporated as a town on November 1st, 1991.

== Demographics ==
In the 2021 Census of Population conducted by Statistics Canada, Hague had a population of 889 living in 339 of its 355 total private dwellings, a change of 1.7% from its 2016 population of 874. With a land area of 1.27 km^{2} (0.49 sq mi), it had a population density of 700.0/km^{2} (1,813.0/sq mi) in 2021.

Canada census – Hague community profile

	2021	2011
Population	889 (+1.7% from 2016)	878 (24.2% from 2006)
Land area	1.27 km^{2} (0.49 sq mi)	1.08 km^{2} (0.42 sq mi)
Population density	702.3/km^{2} (1,819/sq mi)	815.5/km^{2} (2,112/sq mi)
Median age	34.0 (M: 34.4, F: 34.0)
Private dwellings	355 (total) 339 (occupied)	325 (total)
Median household income	$88,000

References: 2021 2011

== Climate ==
Climate data for Hague
Month	Jan	Feb	Mar	Apr	May	Jun	Jul	Aug	Sep	Oct	Nov	Dec	Year
Record high °C (°F)	6 (43)	6 (43)	15 (59)	31.1 (88.0)	35 (95)	40 (104)	37 (99)	37 (99)	34 (93)	28.3 (82.9)	18.9 (66.0)	6.7 (44.1)	40 (104)
Mean daily maximum °C (°F)	−12.7 (9.1)	−9.3 (15.3)	−2.5 (27.5)	9.5 (49.1)	18.5 (65.3)	22.3 (72.1)	24.4 (75.9)	23.4 (74.1)	17 (63)	10.4 (50.7)	−2.6 (27.3)	−11.1 (12.0)	7.3 (45.1)
Daily mean °C (°F)	−17.9 (−0.2)	−14.4 (6.1)	−7.5 (18.5)	3.6 (38.5)	11.6 (52.9)	15.7 (60.3)	17.6 (63.7)	16.4 (61.5)	10.5 (50.9)	4.3 (39.7)	−6.9 (19.6)	−15.8 (3.6)	1.4 (34.5)
Mean daily minimum °C (°F)	−23.1 (−9.6)	−19.5 (−3.1)	−12.4 (9.7)	−2.4 (27.7)	4.7 (40.5)	9 (48)	10.7 (51.3)	9.3 (48.7)	4.1 (39.4)	−1.9 (28.6)	−11.2 (11.8)	−20.5 (−4.9)	−4.4 (24.1)
Record low °C (°F)	−47.8 (−54.0)	−41 (−42)	−40 (−40)	−31.1 (−24.0)	−11 (12)	−2 (28)	0 (32)	−2.8 (27.0)	−8.9 (16.0)	−21 (−6)	−33 (−27)	−41.7 (−43.1)	−47.8 (−54.0)
Average precipitation mm (inches)	21.6 (0.85)	14.1 (0.56)	19.4 (0.76)	25.1 (0.99)	47.5 (1.87)	63.5 (2.50)	76.5 (3.01)	47.4 (1.87)	37.8 (1.49)	16.1 (0.63)	18.6 (0.73)	20.9 (0.82)	408.5 (16.08)
Source: Environment Canada

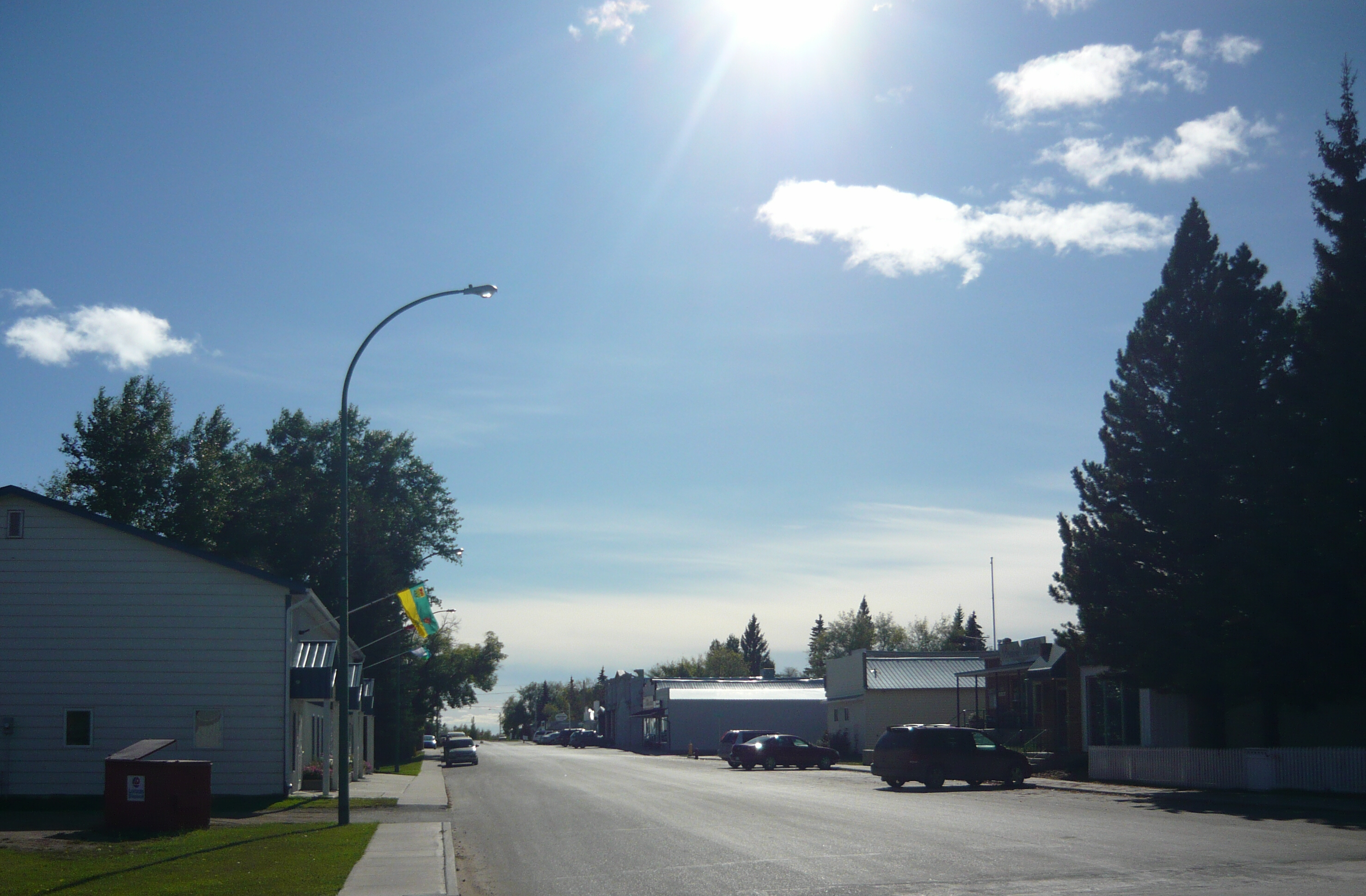
Business District Railway Street

== Ice hockey ==
NHL player Robyn Regehr wrote a letter to the NHLPA's Goals & Dreams program. Hague received $30,000 which was used to purchase a new ice re-surfacer.

== See also ==
- List of towns in Saskatchewan
