= Dalmeny, Saskatchewan =

Town in Saskatchewan, Canada

Dalmeny
- Town
- Town of Dalmeny
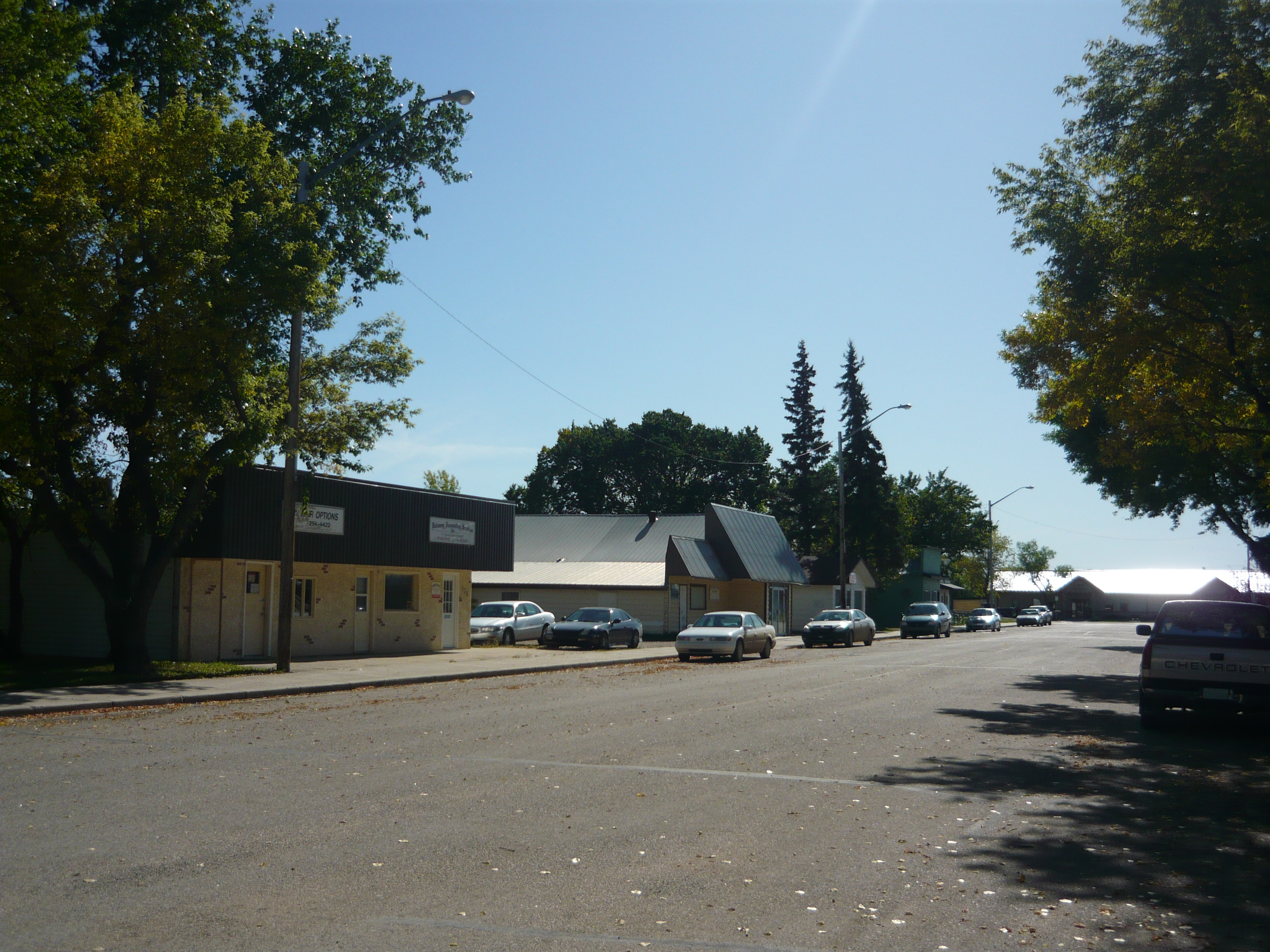
- Business District; Third Street

- Coat of arms
- Motto: Feel the Warmth
- Location within Corman Park No. 344 Location within Saskatchewan
- Coordinates: 52°20′28″N 106°46′24″W
- Country: Canada
- Province: Saskatchewan

Government
  - Mayor: Jon Kroeker

Area
  - Land: 3.28 km^{2} (1.27 sq mi)

Population (2021)
  - Total: 1,766
  - Density: 537.8/km^{2} (1,393/sq mi)
- Time zone: UTC-6 (UTC)
- Postal code: S0K 1E0
- Area code: 306
- Website: https://dalmeny.ca/

Dalmeny is a town in the central part of Saskatchewan, Canada, named after Dalmeny, Scotland. The town is located in the Rural Municipality of Corman Park No. 344, and is about 26.8 km north of Saskatoon. The Dominion Land Survey description of Dalmeny's location is Section 10 Twp 39 Rge 6 W3.

== History ==
The Dalmeny district was first settled around 1900; many of the early settlers were Mennonites. The town site developed in 1904–1905 with the arrival of the Canadian National Railways Carlton branch line and the Winnipeg – Edmonton Main Line. A year later, the post office opened, the first grain elevator was built, and a general store was established.

The village's population growth was slow until the 1970s, when it became known as a bedroom community for people working in Saskatoon. The population grew from 417 to 1964 between 1971 and 1981. In 1983, the village was incorporated as a town.

The town's original hockey arena which was built in the early 1950s was replaced in 2003 with a state-of-the-art new one.

== Demographics ==
In the 2021 Census of Population conducted by Statistics Canada, Dalmeny had a population of 1,766 living in 615 of its 627 total private dwellings, a change of −3.3% from its 2016 population of 1,826. With a land area of 3.28 km^{2} (1.27 sq mi), it had a population density of 538.4/km^{2} (1,394.5/sq mi) in 2021.

Canada census – Dalmeny community profile

	2021	2016	2011
Population	1,766 (-3.3% from 2016)	1,860 (7.3% from 2011)	1,702 (9.1% from 2006)
Land area	3.28 km^{2} (1.27 sq mi)	2.27 km^{2} (0.88 sq mi)	2.27 km^{2} (0.88 sq mi)
Population density	537.8/km^{2} (1,393/sq mi)	805.7/km^{2} (2,087/sq mi)	751.0/km^{2} (1,945/sq mi)
Median age	36.4 (M: 35.2, F: 38.4)	35.7 (M: 34.8, F: 36.5)
Private dwellings	627 (total) 615 (occupied)	609 (total)	563 (total)
Median household income	$107,000

References: 2021 2016 2011

== Education ==
- Prairie View School — Kindergarten to Grade 6
- Dalmeny High School — Grade 7 to 12 Both schools are part of Prairie Spirit School Division.

Dalmeny SD#1681, Dalmeny Town SD# 2094, Rose Leaf SD #1681 and Willow Lake SD# 2081 were early one room school houses in this area.

== Law enforcement ==
The town of Dalmeny operates a police force which consists of three officers. The Dalmeny Police Service works in partnership with the Royal Canadian Mounted Police along with Corman Park Police Service. As well, the Saskatoon Police Service provide additional support if and when needed.

== See also ==
- List of communities in Saskatchewan
