= Blaine Lake =

Town in Saskatchewan, Canada

- Town
- Town of Blaine Lake
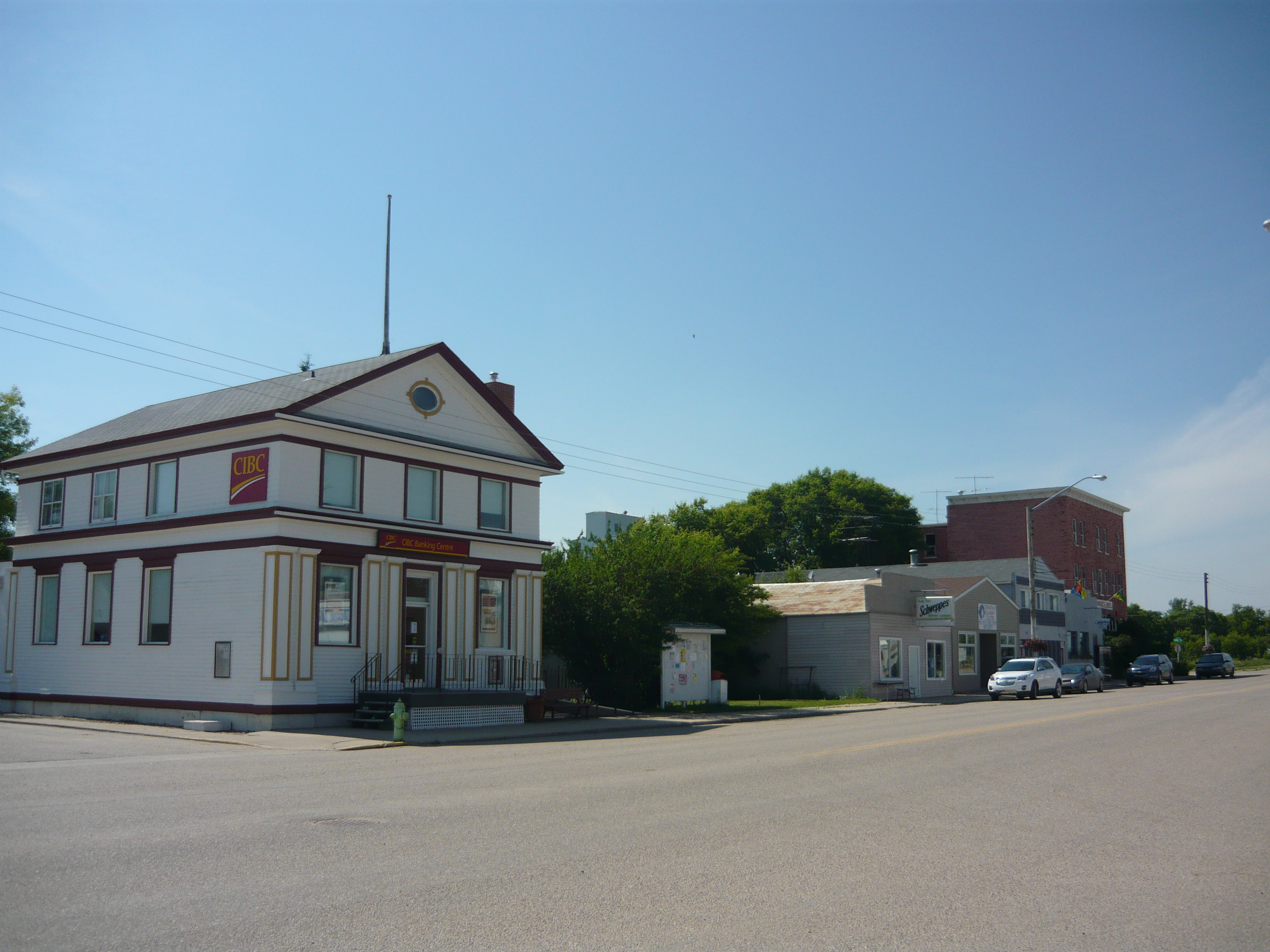
- Main Street
- Motto: "Gateway to the Lakes"
- Interactive map of Blaine Lake
- Coordinates: 52°49′42″N 106°52′53″W
- Country: Canada
- Province: Saskatchewan
- Rural Municipality: Blaine Lake
- Post Office opened: 1903
- Incorporated: 1912

Government
  - Mayor: Tom Mayer
  - Blaine Lake Town Council: Councilors: Bev Breland; Melissa Johnson; Rodger Pederson; Maxamus Stevenson; Jason Weber; Barry Glencross

Area
  - Total: 1.75 km^{2} (0.68 sq mi)
- Elevation: 519 m (1,703 ft)

Population (2021 Census)
  - Total: 509
  - Density: 272.9/km^{2} (707/sq mi)
- Demonym: Blaine Laker
- Time zone: UTC−6 (UTC)
- Postal code span: S0J 0J0
- Area code: 306
- NTS Map: 073B15
- GNBC Code: HAECA
- Website: Town of Blaine Lake

Blaine Lake is a town in central Saskatchewan, Canada. It is located 85 km north of Saskatoon, 104 km southwest of Prince Albert and 104 km east of North Battleford at the junction of Highway 12 and Highway 40. Nearby are the urban centres of Shellbrook and Rosthern. Blaine Lake is considered the "Gateway to the Northern Lakes" due to its proximity to fishing, hunting and camping sites, as well as its convenient location at the junction of two highways.

== History ==
A surveyor named Blaine was drowned in the lake prior to the establishment in 1911.

The historic CN train station that now houses the Blaine Lake Wapiti Library along with the local town history museum. The station was built in 1912 two years after the rail line between Prince Albert and North Battleford was constructed and served the community until 1973.

Heritage properties

A number of heritage buildings are located within the community: St. Andrew's Roman Catholic Church built in 1914, the Doukhobor Prayer Home (meeting house) built in 1931 and the CN Station Building built in 1912. The Doukhobor Dugout House is a Provincial Heritage Property 18 km (12 mi) southeast of the town.

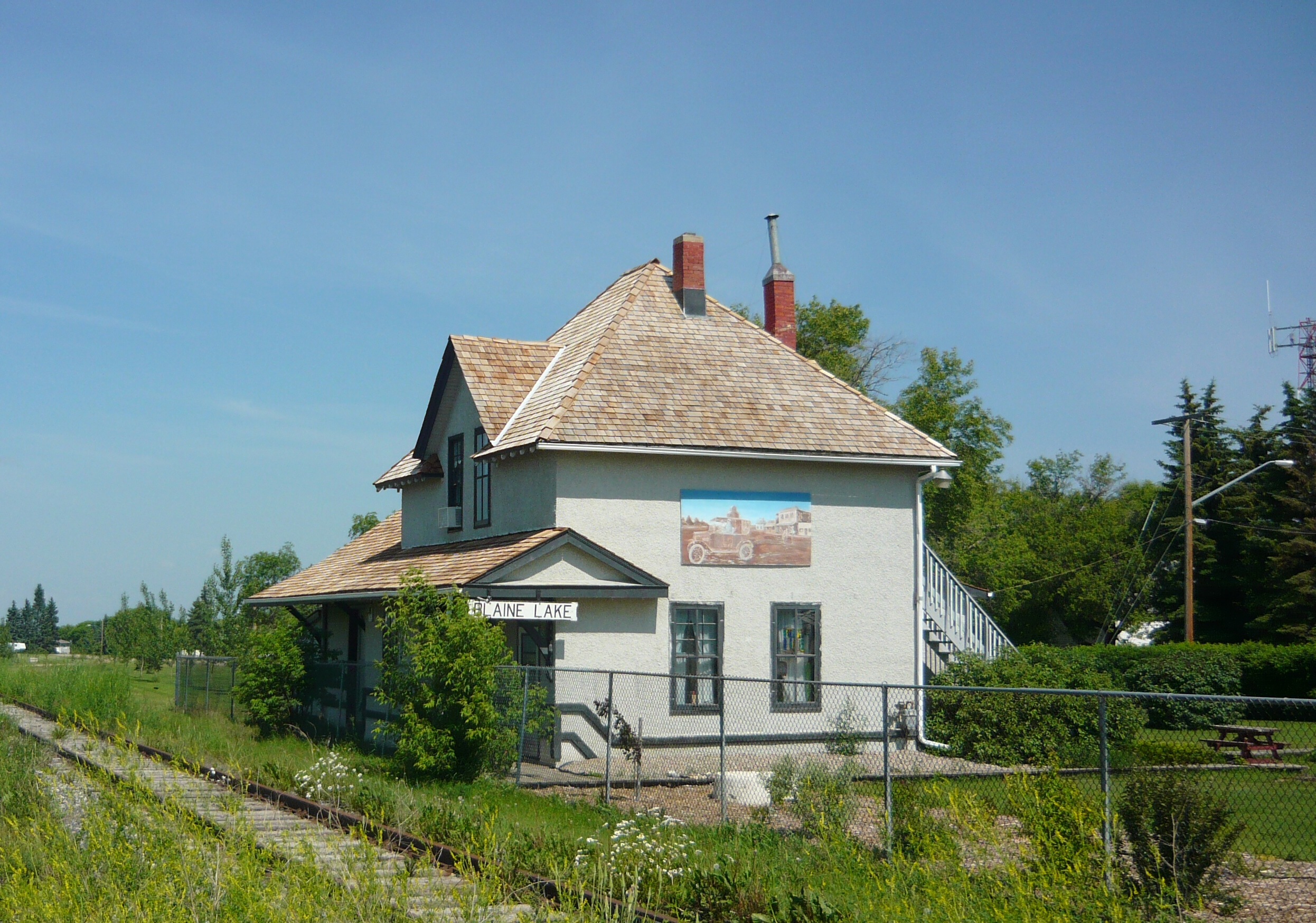
CN Station Building

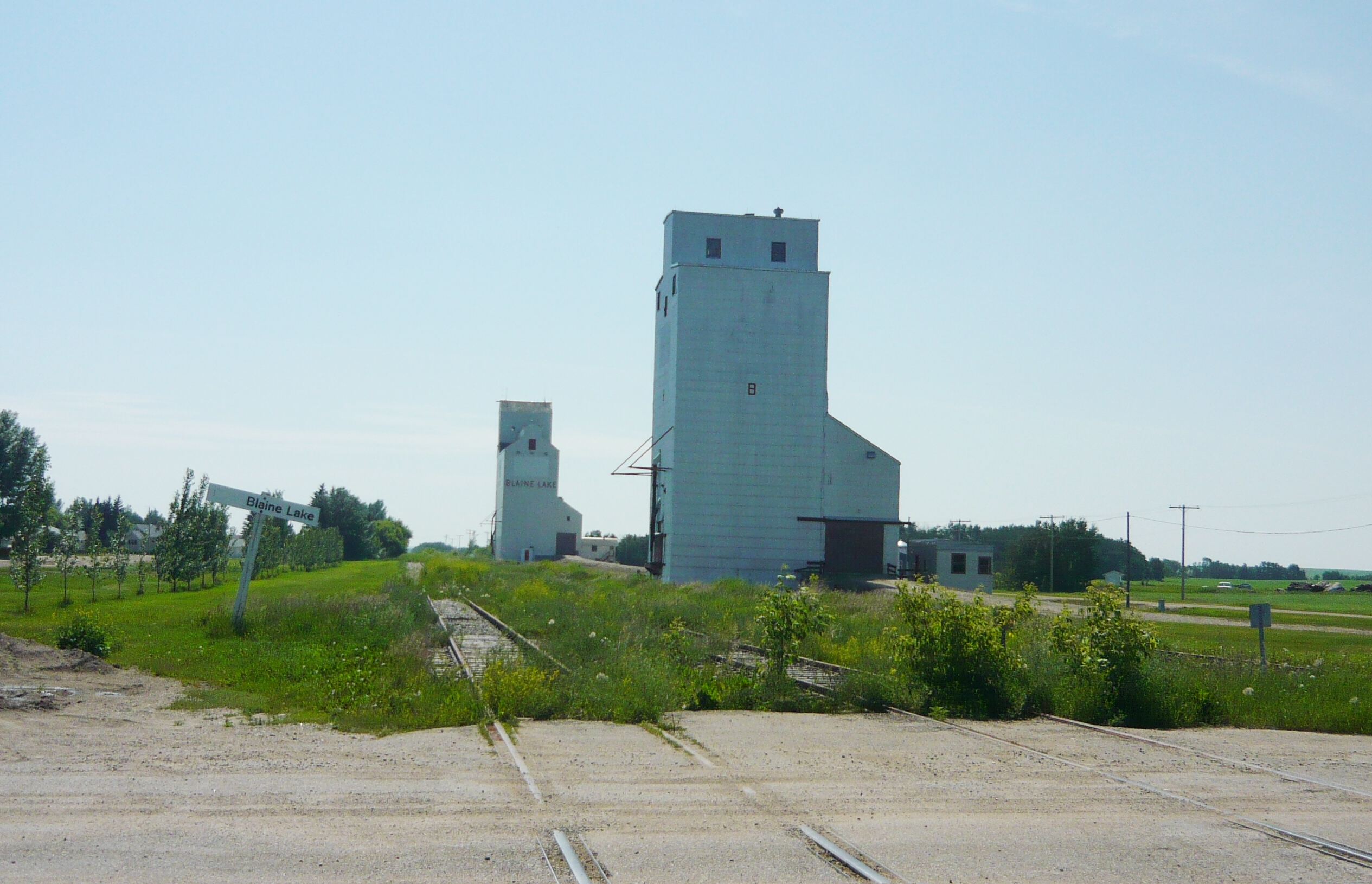
Grain elevators

Notable Citizens : Charles Juravinski, one of Hamilton, Ontario’s most successful businessmen and philanthropists. Charles was born in Blaine Lake, on November 1, 1929.

== Demographics ==
In the 2021 Census of Population conducted by Statistics Canada, Blaine Lake had a population of 509 living in 250 of its 296 total private dwellings, a change of 2% from its 2016 population of 499. With a land area of 1.86 km^{2} (0.72 sq mi), it had a population density of 273.7/km^{2} (708.8/sq mi) in 2021.

Canada census – Blaine Lake community profile

	2021	2016	2011
Population	509 (+2.0% from 2016)	499 (-2.2% from 2011)	510 (+8.1% from 2006)
Land area	1.86 km^{2} (0.72 sq mi)	1.95 km^{2} (0.75 sq mi)	1.95 km^{2} (0.75 sq mi)
Population density	272.9/km^{2} (707/sq mi)	255.9/km^{2} (663/sq mi)	261.6/km^{2} (678/sq mi)
Median age	48.0 (M: 46.8, F: 48.0)	50.1 (M: 49, F: 51.3)	49.7 (M: 49.2, F: 50.2)
Private dwellings	296 (total) 250 (occupied)	309 (total)	309 (total)
Median household income	$50,400

References: 2021 2016 2011

== Amenities ==
Blaine Lake is known for being "The Gateway to the Lakes" as many lakes, campgrounds, golf courses and tourist attractions are located within a short distance from the town.

The community has a curling rink, a skating rink, grocery store, hardware store, post office, several restaurants and two gas stations. Other businesses include a SARCAN recycle depot, an insurance broker, a veterinarian, a metal fabricator, a sign shop, and several construction contractors.

== Education ==
Blaine Lake has a kindergarten to grade 12 school, called Blaine Lake Composite which is part of the Prairie Spirit School Division # 206.

== See also ==
- List of communities in Saskatchewan
- List of francophone communities in Saskatchewan
