= Saskatchewan Highway 225 =

Provincial highway in Saskatchewan, Canada

Highway 225

Route information
- Maintained by Ministry of Highways and Infrastructure
- Length: 36.7 km (22.8 mi)

Major junctions
- West end: Highway 312 near Batoche
- East end: Highway 2 near Domremy

Location
- Country: Canada
- Province: Saskatchewan
- Rural municipalities: Fish Creek, St. Louis

Highway system
- Provincial highways in Saskatchewan
← Highway 224	→ Highway 229

Highway 225 is a provincial highway in the Canadian province of Saskatchewan. Saskatchewan's 200-series highways primarily service its recreational areas. The highway runs from Highway 312 to Highway 2 near Domremy. It is about 37 kilometres (23 mi) long.

Highway 225 provides access to Batoche, Batoche National Historic Site, and St. Isidore-de-Bellevue.

== Route description ==
Hwy 225 begins in the Rural Municipality of Fish Creek No. 402 at an intersection with Hwy 312 within the One Arrow 95-1A Indian reserve, with the road continuing south towards both the locality of Fish Creek and the Battle of Tourond's Coulee / Fish Creek National Historic Site as Fish Creek Road (Range Road 3020). It heads north as a paved, two-lane highway, running parallel to the South Saskatchewan River as it traverses rural farmland for a few kilometres, leaving both the Indian reserve and the RM to enter the Rural Municipality of St. Louis No. 431. The highway winds its north along the riverbanks, having an intersection with an access road for the One Arrow 95 Indian reserve before travelling past the Batoche National Historic Site. Hwy 225 now makes a sharp right turn at the intersection with Hwy 782, with the pavement turning to gravel as the road heads due east through rural areas, leaving the river behind and crossing Range Road 3011 (provides another access point to One Arrow 95) on its way to pass through the hamlet of St. Isidore-de-Bellevue, by the Minnitinas Ski Area, and cross Minnitinas Hill. After a few more kilometres, Hwy 225 comes to an end at an intersection with Hwy 2 (Veterans Memorial Highway), with the road continuing east into Domremy as Township Road 442.

== Major intersections ==
From west to east:

Rural municipality	Location	km	mi	Destinations	Notes
Fish Creek No. 402	One Arrow 95-1A	0.0	0.0	Highway 312 – Rosthern, Wakaw Fish Creek Road (Range Road 3020) – Fish Creek, Battle of Tourond's Coulee / Fish Creek National Historic Site	Western terminus; road continues south as Fish Creek Road
St. Louis No. 431		8.1	5.0	One Arrow 95 access road	
St. Louis No. 431	Batoche National Historic Site	9.5	5.9	Batoche National Historic Site access road	
St. Louis No. 431		13.5	8.4	Highway 782 east – St. Laurent de Grandin, St. Louis	Western terminus of Hwy 782; western end of unpaved section
St. Louis No. 431		18.1	11.2	Range Road 3011 – One Arrow 95	
St. Louis No. 431		36.7	22.8	Highway 2 (Veterans Memorial Highway) – Prince Albert, Wakaw Township Road 442 – Domremy	Eastern terminus; eastern end of unpaved section; road continues east as Township Road 442
1.000 mi = 1.609 km; 1.000 km = 0.621 mi

== See also ==
- Transportation in Saskatchewan
- Roads in Saskatchewan
