= One Arrow First Nation =

Cree First Nations band government

Coordinates: 52°44′21″N 106°04′05″W

One Arrow First Nation (Cree: ᑳ ᐯᔭᒁᐢᑯᓇᒼ kâ-pêyakwâskonam) is a Cree First Nations band government in Bellevue, Saskatchewan, Canada. Its main reserve is located just south of Batoche near the South Saskatchewan River about 100 km (62 mi) north-east of Saskatoon. The One Arrow First Nation's reserve is in the aspen parkland biome. It is bordered by the rural municipalities of St. Louis No. 431, Fish Creek No. 402, and Duck Lake No. 463.

Named after Chief One Arrow, a signatory to Treaty Six at Fort Carlton in 1876, the band had land disputes with the Métis of Batoche in the 1880s, and their supposed role in the North-West Rebellion is quite controversial. Chief One Arrow himself claimed they were coerced into participating alongside Louis Riel, while the Métis claim they were allied.

Currently Chief Janine Baldhead presides over the band government (since April 21, 2023)

It is the birthplace of singer, songwriter, actor and humanitarian/entrepreneur Tom Jackson.

Communities near One Arrow First Nation include Batoche, Bellevue, and Wakaw.

== List of reserves ==
The band governs fourteen reserves:

- One Arrow Indian Reserve No. 95, 53 km south-southwest of Prince Albert, 5353.30 ha
- One Arrow Indian Reserve No. 95-1A, 27 km northeast of Hague, 109.40 ha.
- One Arrow Indian Reserve No. 95-1B, 8 km southeast of Duck Lake, 73.40 ha.
- One Arrow Indian Reserve No. 95-1C, 9 km southwest of Alvena, 226.80 ha.
- One Arrow Indian Reserve No. 95-1D, 11 km east of Duck Lake, 192.80 ha.
- One Arrow Indian Reserve No. 95-1E, 17 km northwest of Cudworth, 1061.50 ha.
- One Arrow Indian Reserve No. 95-1F, 17 km northeast of Duck Lake, 440.80 ha
- One Arrow Indian Reserve No. 95-1G, 26 km northeast of Blaine Lake, 546.30 ha.
- One Arrow Indian Reserve No. 95-1H, 8 km northeast of Alvena, 250.70 ha.
- One Arrow Indian Reserve No. 95-1I, 27 km northwest of Wakaw, 668.50 ha.
- One Arrow Indian Reserve No. 95-1J, 1991.50 ha
- Sounding Sky Indian Reserve, 0.10 ha.
- Tipamahto Aski Indian Reserve No. 95A, 15 km northwest of Duck Lake, 129 ha.
- Willow Cree Indian Reserve, adjacent to Duck Lake, 50 km southwest of Prince Albert, 277.20 ha

== See also ==
- List of Indian reserves in Saskatchewan
