= Saskatchewan Highway 312 =

Provincial highway in Saskatchewan, Canada

Highway 312

Route information
- Maintained by Ministry of Highways and Infrastructure
- Length: 78 km (48 mi)

Major junctions
- West end: Highway 12 near Hepburn
- Highway 11 at Rosthern; Highway 225 near Batoche
- East end: Highway 2 near Wakaw

Location
- Country: Canada
- Province: Saskatchewan
- Rural municipalities: Laird, Rosthern, Fish Creek, Hoodoo
- Towns: Waldheim, Rosthern

Highway system
- Provincial highways in Saskatchewan
| ← Highway 310 | → Highway 316 |

Highway 312 is a provincial highway in the Canadian province of Saskatchewan. It runs from Highway 12 to Highway 2 near Wakaw.

The highway provides access to Waldheim, Waldheim Regional Park, Laird, and Rosthern. It connects with Highways 683, 11, and 225 and crosses the South Saskatchewan River via the Gabriel Bridge. The highway is about 78 kilometres (48 mi) long.

== Route description ==
Hwy 312 begins in the Rural Municipality of Laird No. 404 at a junction with Hwy 12, just a couple kilometres northeast of Hepburn, with junction between Hwy 12, Hwy 375, and Hwy 785 lying immediately to the south. It heads through rural farmland for several kilometres before curving northeast the follow a former railway line and pass through Waldheim, where it travels past Waldheim Regional Park. The highway now curves due eastward, leaving behind the former rail line to have an intersection with Range Road 3050, which provides access to the village of Laird lying just to the north, before entering the Rural Municipality of Rosthern No. 403. Hwy 312 travels through rural prairie lands for several kilometres to have an intersection with Hwy 683 before travelling along the north side of the town of Rosthern via Saskatchewan Street, where it travels through a mix of neighbourhoods and businesses before crossing a railway and having an intersection with Hwy 11 (Louis Riel Trail). Leaving Rosthern, it travels near the southern boundary of both Valley Regional Park and Rempel Lake (access is via Hwy 11) on its way to cross the Gabriel Bridge over the South Saskatchewan River into the Rural Municipality of Fish Creek No. 402.

Immediately passing through the One Arrow 95-1A Indian reserve, the highway has a junction with Hwy 225 (provides access to the Batoche National Historic Site) and Fish Creek Road (Range Road 3020, provides access to Battle of Tourond's Coulee / Fish Creek National Historic Site) before heading southeast through wooded areas. Curving back east, it crosses a couple of lakes and travels past several others to enter the town of Wakaw, where it comes to an end on the south side of town at an intersection with Hwy 2 (Veterans Memorial Highway), located along the border with the Rural Municipality of Hoodoo No. 401. The entire length of Hwy 312 is a paved, two-lane highway.

== Major intersections ==
From west to east:

| Rural municipality | Location | km | mi | Destinations | Notes |
|---|---|---|---|---|---|
| Laird No. 404 | | 0.0 | 0.0 | Highway 12 – Blaine Lake, Saskatoon | Western terminus |
| Laird No. 404 | Waldheim | 11.4 | 7.1 | 2nd Street N (Waldheim Access Road) – Waldheim, Waldheim Regional Park | |
| Laird No. 404 | | 18.8 | 11.7 | Laird access road (Range Road 3050) | |
| Rosthern No. 403 | | 20.3 | 12.6 | Highway 683 north – Carlton | Southern terminus of Hwy 683 |
| Rosthern No. 403 | Rosthern | 36.8 | 22.9 | Highway 11 (Louis Riel Trail) – Prince Albert, Saskatoon | |
| ↑ / ↓ | | 50.5 | 31.4 | Gabriel Bridge across the South Saskatchewan River | |
| Fish Creek No. 402 | One Arrow 95-1A | 52.0 | 32.3 | Highway 225 north – Batoche; Fish Creek Road (Range Road 3020) – Fish Creek, Battle of Tourond's Coulee / Fish Creek National Historic Site | Southern terminus of Hwy 225 |
| Fish Creek No. 402 / Hoodoo No. 401 boundary | Wakaw | 78.0 | 48.5 | Highway 2 (Veterans Memorial Highway) to Highway 41 – Prince Albert, Watrous, Moose Jaw | Eastern terminus |
1.000 mi = 1.609 km; 1.000 km = 0.621 mi

== See also ==
- Transportation in Saskatchewan
- Roads in Saskatchewan
