= Waldheim, Saskatchewan =

Town in Saskatchewan, Canada

Waldheim
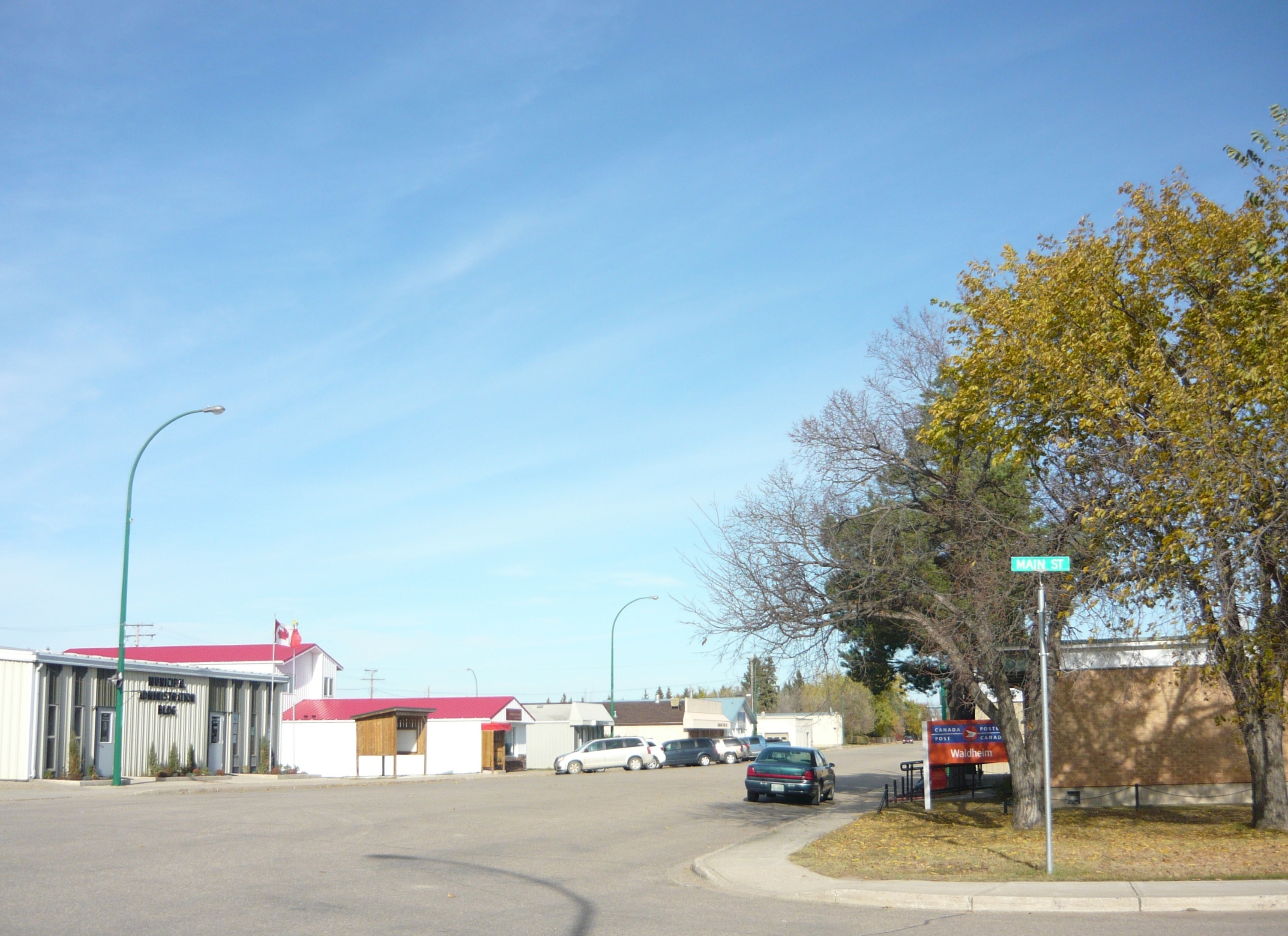
- Central Avenue and Main Street
- Nicknames: Home in the woods; The 'Heim
- Town of Waldheim in Saskatchewan
- Coordinates: 52°39′N 106°37′W
- Country: Canada
- Provinces and territories of Canada: Saskatchewan
- Rural Municipalities (RM): Laird No. 404
- Hamlet and Post office Founded in the NWT: 1900-06-01
- Village: 1908
- Town: 1967

Government
  - Mayor: John Bollinger
  - Federal Electoral District: Carlton Trail-Eagle Creek
  - MP: Kelly Block
  - Provincial Constituency: Biggar-Sask Valley
  - MLA: Randy Weekes

Area
  - Total: 1.97 km^{2} (0.76 sq mi)

Population (2011)
  - Total: 1,035
  - Density: 525.5/km^{2} (1,361/sq mi)
- Time zone: UTC−6 (CST)
- Website: waldheim.ca

Waldheim is a town of 1,035 residents in the Rural Municipality of Laird No. 404, in the Canadian province of Saskatchewan, 57 kilometres (35 mi) north of Saskatoon. Waldheim is located on Highway 312 in central Saskatchewan, the "Heart of the Old North-Wes". Fort Carlton, Batoche, Battle of Fish Creek, and Seager Wheeler's Maple Grove Farm are all near Waldheim.

== History ==
Mennonites from Manitoba and South Dakota arrived here to settle and farm in 1893. The Canadian Northern Railway arrived in 1908.

Particularly in the 1870s, Mennonites of Dutch-German origins residing in colonies in the Black Sea region of present-day Ukraine became alarmed at the rising nationalism in the Russian Empire. Along with land shortages in these growing colonies, pressure toward Russification of minorities was threatening Mennonite values in education. Similarly, the promise made by Catherine the Great to exempt them from military service was quite clearly being challenged and rewritten by the then current Russian government. Canada was seeking farming immigrants, and about 7,000 Mennonites chose to immigrate to Manitoba where the government of Canada set aside two reserves for their resettlement. In the early 1890s, some of these families decided to move on to the District of Saskatchewan, thereby establishing a trend that would see considerable Mennonite immigration to the Saskatchewan Valley area before the turn of the century. Many came from Manitoba, but others arrived directly from colonies in Russia, from the Danzig region of Prussia and from Kansas, Nebraska, and Minnesota where they had settled in the 1870s.

Thriving Mennonite farming communities were quickly established in the Saskatchewan Valley area in the vicinities of Aberdeen, Laird, Waldheim, Langham, Dalmeny, and Rosthern particularly. Churches were established, land was broken and cropped, and roads were built.

== Demographics ==
In the 2021 Census of Population conducted by Statistics Canada, Waldheim had a population of 1,237 living in 430 of its 451 total private dwellings, a change of 2% from its 2016 population of 1,213. With a land area of 1.97 km^{2} (0.76 sq mi), it had a population density of 627.9/km^{2} (1,626.3/sq mi) in 2021.

Canada census – Waldheim, Saskatchewan community profile

	2011
Population	1,035 (19.2% from 2006)
Land area	1.97 km^{2} (0.76 sq mi)
Population density	525.5/km^{2} (1,361/sq mi)
Median age
Private dwellings	369 (total)
Median household income

References: 2011

== Recreation and attractions ==
Waldheim features a green space in its downtown area: Sam Wendland Heritage Park. This park was created in 2000, and was dedicated to Sam Wendland for his many years of serving as mayor. The Waldheim Pine Ridge Golf and Country Club is a neighbour to the recreational facility built in 1976 (containing an arena and a curling rink). Westview Jubilee Seniors Centre offers events and services to Waldheim's senior population.

Fort Carlton Hockey League serves a large area in the vicinity of Waldheim, such as Rosthern, Warman, Dalmeny, Shellbrook, Bruno, Martensville, Aberdeen, Blaine Lake, and Cudworth. Sask Valley Minor Hockey League offers level of hockey for Novice, Atoms, Pee Wee, Bantams and Midget.

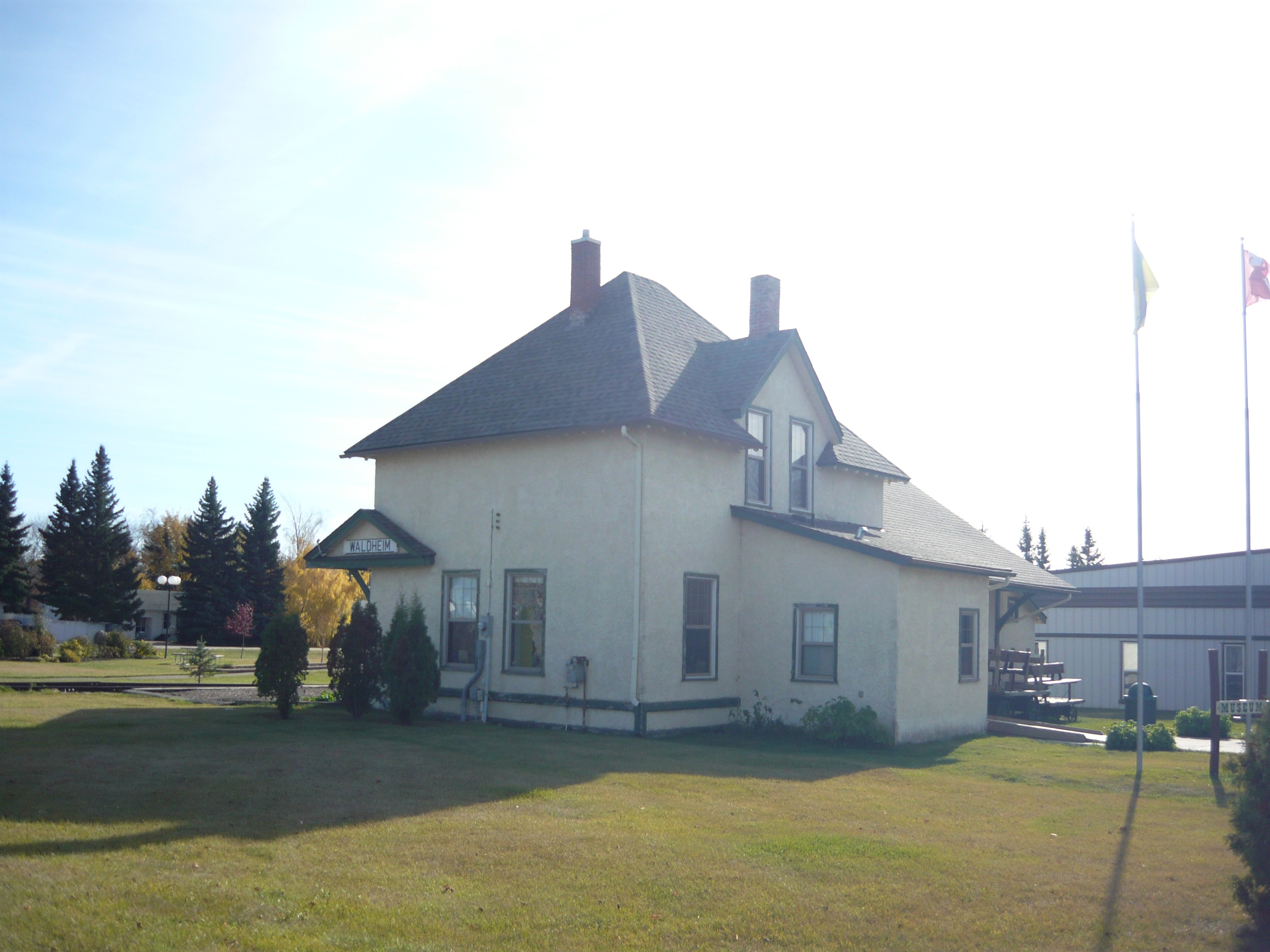
The Waldheim museum in the former Waldheim railway station

Waldheim station is a former Canadian Northern Railway station that closed in 1976. It is now a library and museum.

== Waldheim Valley Regional Park ==
Waldheim Valley Regional Park (52.6167°N 106.6339°W) is a regional park on the east side of Waldheim. The park has a 13-site campground, picnic area, ball diamonds, and the 9-hole Pine Ridge Golf and Country Club. The golf course has a licensed clubhouse, grass greens, is a par 33, and 2,870 total yards. Access is from Highway 312.

== Notable people ==
- Jennifer Bowes, politician
- Howard Dirks, politician
- Dustin Friesen, hockey player
- Ben Heppner (politician), politician
- Henry Feyerabend, evangelist
- Dave Schultz (ice hockey), hockey player

== See also ==
- List of communities in Saskatchewan
- Eigenheim Mennonite Church
- List of towns in Saskatchewan
