= St. Louis, Saskatchewan =

Village in Saskatchewan, Canada

St. Louis
- Village
- Location within Saskatchewan Location within Canada
- Coordinates: 52°55′16″N 105°48′40″W
- Country: Canada
- Province: Saskatchewan
- Electoral district: Saskatoon–University
- Census division: 15
- Rural municipality: St. Louis

Government
  - Mayor: Marc Caron
  - MP: Brad Trost
  - MLA: Delbert Kirsch

Area
  - Total: 1.08 km^{2} (0.42 sq mi)

Population (2016)
  - Total: 415
  - Density: 385/km^{2} (1,000/sq mi)
- Time zone: UTC-6 (CST)
- Postal code: S0J 2C0

St. Louis (2016 population: 415) is a village in the Canadian province of Saskatchewan within the Rural Municipality of St. Louis No. 431 and Census Division No. 15. It is south of the city of Prince Albert and northeast of Batoche.

It was founded by Métis settlers in the late 19th century, and is the northernmost Southbranch Settlement, a series of communities which range from Fish Creek in the south along the South Saskatchewan River through Batoche and St. Laurent to St. Louis.

The village is known also for the St. Louis light, a supposed paranormal anomaly.

== History ==
St. Louis incorporated as a village on May 19, 1959.

St. Louis is home to a large archaeological site of Indigenous artifacts predating those found at Wanuskewin near Saskatoon. Key discoveries at the site have included new species of wolf and buffalo approximately 25% larger than modern species and a bead that indicates decoration of clothing about 1,000 years earlier than previously thought.

St. Louis is just northeast of South Branch House, one of many small trading posts from fur trading days; this post was attacked and burnt by the Atsina in the 18th century, in retaliation for the company's supplying their enemies the Cree and Assiniboine with guns and goods.

== Geography ==
The nearest community of size is Prince Albert, a twenty-seven-minute drive to the north. St. Louis is located near the intersection of Highway 2 north–south and Highway 25; Highway 2 used to run through the village, but now bypasses it several kilometres to the east. The grid road Highway 782 continues westerly along the South Saskatchewan River to arrive at Duck Lake.

== Demographics ==
Population history (1981–2016)
Year	Pop.	±%
1981	448	—
1986	452	+0.9%
1991	433	−4.2%
1996	437	+0.9%
2001	474	+8.5%
2006	431	−9.1%
2011	449	+4.2%
2016	415	−7.6%
Source: Statistics Canada via Saskatchewan Bureau of Statistics

In the 2021 Census of Population conducted by Statistics Canada, St. Louis had a population of 432 living in 152 of its 154 total private dwellings, a change of 4.1% from its 2016 population of 415. With a land area of 0.97 km^{2} (0.37 sq mi), it had a population density of 445.4/km^{2} (1,153.5/sq mi) in 2021.

In the 2016 Census of Population, the Village of St. Louis recorded a population of 415 living in 149 of its 155 total private dwellings, a −8.2% change from its 2011 population of 449. With a land area of 1.08 km^{2} (0.42 sq mi), it had a population density of 384.3/km^{2} (995.2/sq mi) in 2016.

== Attractions ==
St. Louis is known also for its St. Louis light, a supposed paranormal anomaly, the historic St. Louis Bridge and the picturesque beauty of the South Saskatchewan River. A large bison sculpture of an extinct species that was 25% larger than modern bison is on display. The sculpture was the last work of Ralph Berg, who created other monumental pieces in Saskatchewan and Manitoba.

== Notable people ==
- Howard Adams (1921–2001), academic and activist
- John B. Boucher (1938–2010), politician
- Maxime Lepine (1837–1897), politician and entrepreneur
- Rich Pilon (born 1968), former ice hockey player
- Joey Tetarenko (born 1978), former ice hockey player
- Louis Schmidt (1844–1935), politician

== See also ==
- List of communities in Saskatchewan
- List of francophone communities in Saskatchewan
