= Howard Adams =

Metis academic

- Born: September 8, 1921; St. Louis, Saskatchewan
- Died: September 8, 2001 (aged 80); Vancouver, British Columbia
- Citizenship: Canada
- Education: University of California, Berkeley
- Writing career
- Notable awards: National Aboriginal Achievement Award

Howard Adams (September 8, 1921 – September 8, 2001) was a twentieth century Métis academic and activist.

== Life ==
He was born in St. Louis, Saskatchewan, Canada, on September 8, 1921, the son of Olive Elizabeth McDougall, a French Métis mother and William Robert Adams, an English Métis (Anglo-Metis) father. In his youth he briefly joined the Royal Canadian Mounted Police. Adams became the first Métis in Canada to gain his PhD after studies at the University of California, Berkeley in 1966.

He returned to Canada and became a prominent Métis activist, contributing regularly to newspapers and magazines and appearing on Canadian Broadcasting Corporation radio shows. In 1969, he was elected president of the Metis Association of Saskatchewan.

Adams' intellectual influences include Malcolm X whom he saw lecture at Berkeley, and the general radical environment of that institution during the 1960s. He was the maternal great grandson of Louis Riel's lieutenant Maxime Lepine who fought in the North-West Rebellion of 1885.

== Death ==
Adams died in Vancouver, British Columbia, on September 8, 2001, on his 80th birthday.

== Works ==
- The Education of Canadians 1800-1867: The Roots of Separatism, Harvest House, 1968
- Prison of Grass: Canada from a Native Point of View New Press, 1975, ISBN 9780887702112; Fifth House, 1989, ISBN 9780920079515
- Tortured People: The Politics of Colonization Theytus Books Ltd., 1999, ISBN 9780919441378

== Honours ==
- National Aboriginal Achievement Award, now the Indspire Awards, for education, 1999.

== See also ==
- History of Saskatchewan
- Politics of Saskatchewan
