= Maxime Lépine =

Canadian politician (1837–1897)

Maxime Lépine (c. 1837 – September 16, 1897) was a Métis businessman and political figure from Canada. Lépine joined Louis Riel's provisional government in Red River in 1869. A founding member of the Union Saint-Alexandre, Lépine sought to bring together Métis of French-Canadian and Catholic origins. Later, Lépine represented St. Francois Xavier East in the Legislative Assembly of Manitoba from 1874 to 1878.

== Early life ==
Lépine was born in Saint Boniface, Manitoba, the son of Jean-Baptiste Bérard, dit Lépine and Julia Henry. Lépine married Josephte Lavallée and together they had six children, who all grew into adulthood. It is also known that Maxime Lépine studied with the Christian Brothers in St Boniface. Lépine lived in St. François Xavier in the 1870s and managed a Red River cart freighting company which transported goods west to Fort Carlton and Île-à-la-Crosse, Saskatchewan, and south to Pembina, North Dakota, and St. Paul, Minnesota.

== Provisional Government ==
Maxime Lépine along with his brother Ambroise-Dydime, served in the provisional government of Manitoba established in 1869. He served as a councillor in the provisional government created by Riel during the Red River Rebellion. The provisional government was established by Riel, along with other Métis leaders from the Red River Settlement, in 1869. The government was established in order to stop the Canadian government from annexing Rupert's Land. At the time, Rupert's Land was under the control of the Hudson's Bay Company and was made up of territory that today is known as the Prairie provinces. In 1869, the Hudson's Bay Company, the Canadian government, and the British government, held negotiations for the transfer of the lands sovereignty, all the while leaving the Métis out of the conversation. With over 12,000 residents in the Red River Settlement, the Métis people became worried about their status in the new Dominion and decided to fight for their rights. The provisional government was successful in that it was able to negotiate the terms of Métis entry into the Dominion, resulting in The Manitoba Act. The Manitoba Act of 1870 created the province of Manitoba, and secured the rights of Métis by providing bilingual institutions, denominational schools, and granting 1.4-million acres of land to future Métis children.

== Later life ==
Following the creation of Manitoba as a province, Maxime Lépine was able to escape the hands Ontario Orangemen and went on to become a founding member of the Union Saint-Alexandre, which was created to bring together Métis of French-Canadian and Catholic origin. Moreover, Lépine represented St. François-Xavier East in the Legislative Assembly of Manitoba from 1874 to 1878. Maxime served a single term before being defeated in December 1878. In 1882, he moved to Saskatchewan, settling near St. Louis. Maxime Lépine fought at the Battle of Fish Creek and surrendered to General Frederick Dobson Middleton after the defeat at Batoche. He was convicted of high treason and sent to Stony Mountain Penitentiary in August 1885, he was released in 1886 having serving about seven months of his seven-year sentence. In 1896, he was given an appointment in the Indian agency at Battleford. Lépine died in poverty at Duck Lake, Saskatchewan, on 16 September 1897.

== See also ==
- Louis Riel
- Métis National Council
