= Gabriel Dumont (Métis leader) =

Métis leader (1837–1906)

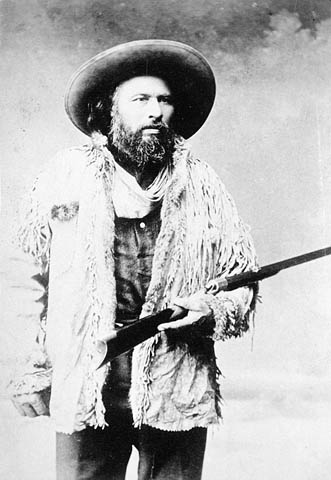
- Born: December 1837 modern-day Winnipeg
- Died: 19 May 1906 (aged 68); St. Isidore-de-Bellevue, Saskatchewan, Canada
- Known for: Métis military leader
- Spouse: Madeleine Wilkie

Gabriel Dumont (1837–1906) was a Métis political figure best known for being a prominent leader of the Métis people. Dumont was well known for his movements within the North-West Rebellion at the battles of Batoche, Fish Creek, and Duck Lake as well as for his role in the signing of treaties with the Blackfoot tribe, the traditional main enemy of the Métis.

Dumont was born to Isidore Dumont and Louise Laframboise in 1837 in Red River. Growing up Dumont had little in the way of education – he was illiterate but could speak seven languages. In the early stages of his life, Dumont relied on buffalo hunting in order to gain a source of food. His family made a living through hunting buffalo and trading with the Hudson's Bay Company. After his time leading the Métis people alongside Louis Riel, Dumont spent time travelling throughout the United States where he spoke at public speaking events and political campaigns. In 1889 he dictated his memoirs in Quebec.

Dumont was known throughout the Métis community for his various political and military endeavours. Among his major political campaigns was the severing of a treaty between the Métis and the Dakota in 1882. Just one year later, Dumont was elected hunt chief of the Saskatchewan Métis. Dumont was known as the adjutant general of the Métis people – he played a large role in the well-being of the Métis community and their subsequent rebellion against the Canadian government during the North-West Rebellion. Dumont also figured prominently in the Battle of Duck Lake, as well as the battles of Fish Creek and Batoche.

Dumont's legacy is marked by his grave in Batoche, as well as through his mark on the Métis people. Gabriel Bridge, a bridge that spans the Saskatchewan River, is named after Dumont, as are several research institutions and schools. In addition, many books and poems have been written about Dumont's life, his works, and his legacy as a political figure.

== Early life ==
Gabriel Dumont was born in December 1837 in what is now known as Winnipeg as the fourth child and eldest son of 11 children.

His parents were Isidore Dumont (known commonly as Ekapow) and Louise Laframboise, who made their home in the Red River Colony. Gabriel was the grandson of the French-Canadian voyageur Jean-Baptiste Dumont and his First-Nations wife Josette of the Tsuu T’ina-Crow tribe. Dumont was not educated in a traditional European education system, rather he learned important skills during his childhood travelling across the Canadian Prairies (Great Plains) following the bison and learning the skills to become a hunter.

The Dumont family was known throughout the settlement of Red River as a prominent Métis buffalo hunting family. In addition to this distinction, they held a long-vaunted relationship with the Saskatchewan area as leaders of a brigade. The Dumont family made their fortune through hunting in the lands controlled by the Hudson's Bay Company, with the primary source of their income coming through the trade of pemmican with the company. Dumont was introduced to the art of Métis buffalo hunting in his childhood years, and over time mastered the nuances of prairie life. This would equip him in the years to come for the conflict he would endure.

Madeleine Wilkie – the daughter of Jean Baptiste Wilkie and his Métis wife Amable Elise Azure – married Dumont in 1858. Throughout his travels as a hunter, Dumont traded with different tribes and picked up different languages making him more valuable to his tribe. In 1868, Dumont and his wife settled in the Batoche area permanently.

Dumont was known as a hunter and as a convenor of multilingualism. It was purported that Dumont could converse with an individual in no less than seven separate languages, although it was noted that Dumont never learned more than a few small phrases in English. His skills as a hunter and marksman were known in both the disciplines of bow and rifle. In addition to these traits, Dumont was known as a proficient horseman. In much the same vein as many of the other prominent Métis leaders of his day such as Louis Riel, Dumont had become known as a leader of diplomacy in the northern plains of the West.

== Military actions and conflicts ==
Dumont was first introduced to plains warfare at the young age of 13 in 1851, where he fought in the Battle of Grand Coteau against the much larger contingent of Yankton Sioux. Dumont's actions in that conflict included defending a large Métis encampment against the advances of a Dakota war party.

In 1862, at the age of 24, Dumont served as the intermediary between the Métis and the Dakota whilst being accompanied by his father Isadore Dumont and uncle Jean Baptise Dumont. Later on, Dumont helped to sign a treaty with the Blackfoot, an action that led to a long state of peace with the traditional enemies of the Métis.

Although he was considered one of the figureheads of the Métis movement at the time, Dumont was not involved in the Red River Rebellion that took place from 1869 to 1870. However, Dumont did move quickly to Fort Garry in order to offer his military assistance during Colonel Garnet Wolseley's movement on the area.

Around the time of 1885, the North-West Rebellion broke out. Dumont's army of 300 Métis soldiers organized near Duck Lake on 26 March, and conflict broke out between the ranks of the Métis and the North-West Mounted Police later that day. Among the dead on the Métis side was Dumont's brother, Isidore – the victim of a botched parley attempt. Dumont was dealt a glancing blow to his head from a stray bullet during the battle, cutting an artery, and was thereafter confined to nursing his injury while the rest of the North-West Rebellion played out. However, this injury suffered during the Duck Lake confrontation did not prevent Dumont from leading his soldiers.

Dumont also played a key role in discovering the traitors within the Saskatchewan Métis. In particular, Dumont was a part of the arrest of Albert Monkman. Dumont ensured the safety of Louis Riel by jumping in front of Monkman's revolver when he pulled it on Riel, leading to Monkman's quick arrest. Dumont was acutely aware that more Canadian troops led by General Frederick Middleton were streaming towards their location. In order to combat the advancing threat, Dumont proposed a campaign of terror that focused on uprooting railroads and prolonged periods of violence against Canadian soldiers. Riel was more inclined towards a peaceful resolution to proceedings, and Dumont deferred to Riel's judgements.

Dumont's contingent of 300 Métis soldiers clashed with the opposing Canadian soldiers on 24 April at a place dubbed Fish Creek by the Canadians. The efforts of the Métis soldiers caused General Middleton to pause in his advancement towards Batoche. With the battle only lasting one day, the Métis soldiers were outnumbered five to one. Dumont's skillful military leadership allowed them to drive off the attackers and enabled the Métis soldiers to eventually retreat to the relative safety of Batoche. Once the Canadian soldiers reached Batoche, Dumont led a defence of the Métis community that lasted four days. After the first day there was no clear winner amongst the two sides, despite the Métis being once again vastly outnumbered. Although they lacked the numbers to truly put a dent in the Canadian forces, Dumont's group handicapped a military steamer and managed to repel several of Middleton's infantry pushes. The Métis utilized the tactic of digging holes approximately every 75 m (246 ft) to allow for the Métis troops to hide and advance throughout a vast majority of land, allowing for a place to watch the Canadians and easily attack. By the fourth day of the defence, the Métis soldiers were out of ammunition and shooting nails and pieces of metal. That day, the Canadian soldiers broke through Dumont's lines and took Batoche. Many Métis were saved because of the holes that were previously dug. For days afterwards, Dumont remained in the vicinity of Batoche to ensure that blankets were distributed to the now homeless Métis women and children. During this period Dumont also searched for Riel, who had surrendered to the Canadian soldiers in the interim on May 15. When Dumont learned of Riel's fate, he quickly left Batoche and travelled to the United States.

After crossing the border into the United States via the Cypress Hills and Montana Territory, Dumont and his companion Michel Dumas were detained almost immediately. However, Dumont and Dumas were quickly released following a memo sent from the Oval Office ordering their release immediately. Although Dumont hid for some time in the United States, he was still wanted in Canada and had developed into something of a folk hero in Saskatchewan. While Dumont was indeed in hiding, it was rumoured that the soldiers looking for him made a rather feeble attempt to find him after learning that "le petit", his famous rifle, was still in his possession.

In July 1886 the Canadian government announced that amnesty was available to Dumont. He eventually returned to Batoche, where he spent time dictating two separate memoirs of the North-West Rebellion.

== Political history ==
Dumont's skills gained from his heritage as a buffalo hunter influenced him positively in politics. By the year 1863, the ranks of the buffalo hunters amongst the Saskatchewan Métis numbered around 200 – enough to require some form of formal organization. In 1863 he was first elected as the hunt chief of the Saskatchewan Métis. He would remain in this position until 1881 – around the time that the buffalo herds had almost entirely disappeared from the region that Dumont was hunt chief of. Dumont's experience on the buffalo hunt gave him a great vision for the downturn of the buffalo trade during the 1870s.

He was known as a leader with a vision for the Métis, as he recognized that the declining numbers of the buffalo in Western Canada coupled with the encroaching Canadian agricultural movement spreading from the east would spark a great amount of change on the prairies. His political agenda consisted of maintaining the independence of the Saskatchewan Métis both politically and economically. In December 1873, after a meeting Dumont called in order to form a government for the Métis at St. Laurent (De Grandin), Dumont was immediately elected leader of the council of St. Laurent. Through his position as the leader of the council, Dumont created and put into place a constitution for the Métis that was followed for some time afterwards.

In his role as president of the council, Dumont's responsibilities included overseeing a committee of elected Métis councillors, and mediating relations between the council and the people of St. Laurent. During this period of time the Canadian government had begun to lay claim to the position of governing body in the region, which sparked conflict with Dumont and his council. At first Dumont was passive, informing the government that the purpose of the local government was simply that – to govern locally. The goal of the council was not to form a rebellion according to Dumont. Reassured by Dumont's implorements, colonial officials saw little cause to panic.

Incidentally however, Dumont did seek a degree of complete authority. When land surveyors from the Canadian government began to arrive in Saskatchewan during the 1870s, they showed a complete lack of regard for the Métis system of land tenure When the North-West Mounted Police arrived on the plains in 1874, it proved the volatility of the situation – Sir John A. Macdonald's government had no plans to treat the Métis as a self-governing entity.

Dumont was re-elected president and leader of the council at St. Laurent in December 1874. In order to ensure that order was kept in the region, Dumont's government attempted to impose fines on Métis who ignored the rules of the buffalo hunt. These individuals did not appreciate the tactics Dumont's government was employing, and complained to the Hudson's Bay Company factor Lawrence Clarke. Clarke sent their concerns on to Lieutenant Governor Alexander Morris, claiming that the Métis were in open revolt against the Canadian government. After this incident the North-West Mounted Police were dispatched to investigate, and found no issue with Dumont's dealings. However, the incident did spell the virtual end of the rule of the governing council at St. Laurent, although the council itself remained.

During the 1880s Dumont's council sent petitions to the capital in Ottawa imploring the government to recognize the traditional land holdings (tenure) of the Métis. When these petitions went unanswered by the prime minister and his cabinet, Dumont and the Métis felt compelled to protect the land through a more direct method. In March 1884, a meeting was called by Dumont at the house of Abraham Montour, in which Dumont proceeded to call for Louis Riel to take up the mantle of leadership that Dumont had been previously holding. Subsequently, a delegation consisting of Dumont and three of his closest companions was sent to Riel requesting that he travel to Saskatchewan in order to provide insight into how best to protect Métis lands and freedoms. Dumont and three others travelled to St. Peter's Jesuit Mission in Montana, and convinced Riel to ride north to Saskatchewan. From that point onwards, Dumont and Riel maintained a close friendship.

In March 1885, Dumont called a general meeting of the Métis of St. Laurent at Batoche. During the meeting, several of the indigenous people present suggested a more violent approach to proceedings – defending their lands against the Canadian government through the use of arms. By the conclusion of the meeting, a new provisional government had been formed led by Dumont, known as the Provisional Government of Saskatchewan. This new government served as a direct competitor to Ottawa's rule. Dumont was chosen to be the adjutant governor of this new government. While Riel was officially the figurehead and overruled Dumont in terms of decision power, Dumont remained responsible for many of the Métis political and military decisions until his retirement from active governing duty.

== Later life and death ==
During the years of the 1870s and the 1880s, Dumont owned a farm near the South Saskatchewan River, where he both worked the farm and operated a ferry across the South Saskatchewan nicknamed "Gabriel's Crossing" around 10 km (6.2 mi) upstream from the ferry that Francois Xavier Letendre dit Batoche began around the same time. Dumont and his wife Madeleine were among the many Métis families that had been pushed out of Manitoba by the Canadian government. In June 1886, Dumont was briefly employed in a western show named Buffalo Bill's Wild West Show, where he was billed as a desperado and a crack shot until the later half of the summer when he travelled to the northeastern States to engage in public speaking events and political campaigns. Dumont soon grew tired of politics and returned to the Wild West Show before settling down at a relative's property to return to hunting, fishing and trapping in 1903. He died at the age of sixty-eight on 19 May 1906 in Batoche, the result of heart failure.

== Legacy ==
The legacy of Dumont as a Métis leader is one that is only outshone by that of Louis Riel. Gabriel Dumont has left a legacy behind that is known through schools, museums, institutions, books, and landmarks. In the spring of 2008, provincial Tourism, Parks, Culture and Sport Minister Christine Tell proclaimed at Duck Lake, that "the 125th commemoration, in 2010, of the 1885 Northwest Rebellion is an excellent opportunity to tell the story of the Prairie Métis and First Nations peoples' struggle with government forces and how it has shaped Canada today." Batoche – the site of a Métis Provisional Government, has been declared a National Historic Site.

The Gabriel Dumont Institute of Native Studies and Applied Research in Saskatchewan was named in his honour when it was founded in 1980. In 1985, a scholarship fund was formed in his name with a $1.24-million capital investment. In 1993, an agreement was set up between the institute and the University of Saskatchewan creating the Gabriel Dumont College. The Gabriel Bridge was built in 1969 over the South Saskatchewan River east of Rosthern, Saskatchewan. It is located at the site of Gabriel's Crossing, where he ran a small store, billiards hall, and ferry service in the late 1870s and early 1880s. In 1998, the public French-first-language high school in London, Ontario, was renamed École secondaire Gabriel-Dumont in Dumont's honour.

== See also ==
- Indigenous Canadian personalities
- List of Métis people
- Southbranch Settlement
- James Isbister
