= Eigenheim Mennonite Church =

Church building in Saskatchewan, Canada

Coordinates: 52.6677°N 106.4910°W

Eigenheim Mennonite Church is a Mennonite church in the Canadian province of Saskatchewan which built the first Mennonite Church building in the province.

Located 12 kilometres (7.5 mi) west of Rosthern, Saskatchewan, Canada, on Highway 312, the Eigenheim Mennonite Church has been a local landmark since 1896, when the first Mennonite Church structure in Saskatchewan was completed on the current site. Built of logs cut on the North Saskatchewan River, it was 24 feet (7.3 m) by 40 feet (12 m), the approximate size of a small modern bungalow. As new families arrived to homestead in the area, this first log church very quickly proved inadequate, and in 1902, a new structure was dedicated. By 1954, this structure, too, was in need of renovation and at that time, resulting in a new building that served the congregation until 2010. This structure was donated to the Mennonite Youth Farm close to Rosthern in 2010, and a new church was built to serve the congregation that stands on the original site.

Eigenheim was originally central to a larger church body called the Rosenort Mennonite Church, a multi-congregational church encompassing roughly an area from Hague to Waldheim, Tiefengrund to Rosthern. First elder and prime mover in the development of the Rosenort Mennonite community was Peter Regier, working together with Gerhard Epp, Johann Dueck, David Toews (associated primarily with facilitating further Mennonite immigration after the Russian Revolution and with the building of what is now Rosthern Junior College) and others. By 1929, people in Eigenheim had determined that the large size of the Rosenort Mennonite Church stood in the way of local development and chose independence, with Gerhard G. Epp as elder and H. T. Klaassen as minister.

Eigenheim has always been a staunch supporting congregation of the larger conferences of Mennonites in Saskatchewan, Canada and North America. This tradition is expressed today in activity supporting the Canadian Foodgrains Bank; Mennonite Central Committee; the Christian Witness program of Mennonite Church Canada; Mennonite Church Saskatchewan's camping programs, nursing homes and prison visitation outreach; Rosthern Junior College and Canadian Mennonite University. Through participation in the Rosthern Ministerial, it cooperates in local ventures such as ecumenical worship, a local food bank and Meals on Wheels, to name a few.
