= One Arrow 95-1C =

Indian reserve in Saskatchewan, Canada

Coordinates: 52°33′45″N 105°56′28″W

- Indian reserve
- One Arrow Indian Reserve No. 95-1C
- Location in Saskatchewan
- First Nation: One Arrow
- Country: Canada
- Province: Saskatchewan

Area
  - Total: 227 ha (560 acres)

Population (2016)
  - Total: 10
  - Density: 4.4/km^{2} (11/sq mi)

One Arrow 95-1C is an Indian reserve of the One Arrow First Nation in Saskatchewan. It is about 9 kilometres (5.6 mi) south-west of Alvena. In the 2016 Canadian Census, it recorded a population of 10 living in 4 of its 4 total private dwellings.

== See also ==
- List of Indian reserves in Saskatchewan
