= Louis Schmidt (politician) =

Canadian politician

Louis (Laferte dit) Schmidt
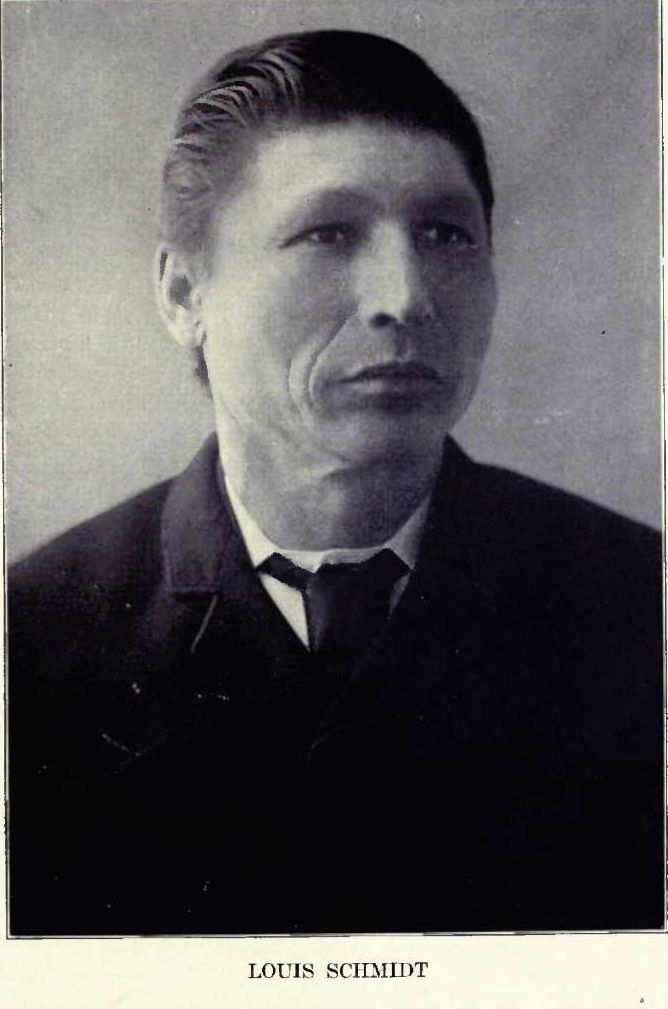
- Born: December 4, 1844; Old Fort near Fort Chipewyan
- Died: November 6, 1935 (aged 90); Saint Louis, Saskatchewan, near Batoche
- Occupations: Metis leader, politician
- Spouse: in 1872 he married Justine Laviolette

Louis Schmidt was born on December 4, 1844, at Old Fort, near Fort Chipewyan and was baptised at Portage La Loche by Father Jean-Baptiste Thibault in July 1845. He died in Saint Louis, Saskatchewan, near Batoche November 6, 1935. In 1869 he was secretary to the first Provisional Government organized in the Red River Colony. Schmidt sat as an elected member of the Manitoba Legislative Assembly for Saint Boniface West in 1870–1874 and again in 1878–1879. He was the grandson of Alexis Bonami and a classmate of Louis Riel.

== See also ==
- St. Louis, Saskatchewan
- 1870 Manitoba general election
