= Battle of Cut Knife =

1885 battle of the North-West Rebellion near Battleford, Saskatchewan, Canada

Coordinates: 52.7453°N 109.0278°W

- Part of the North-West Rebellion
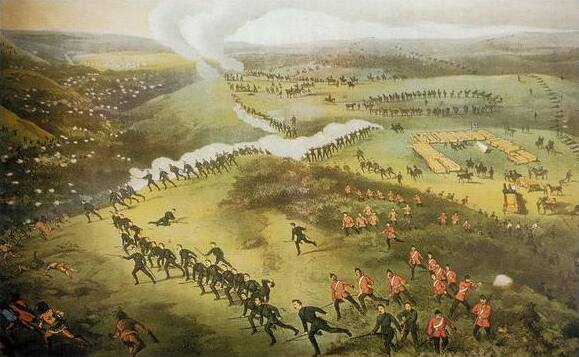
- Contemporary lithograph from The Canadian Pictorial and Illustrated War News.
Date	May 2, 1885
Location	Near Battleford, Saskatchewan District, NWT, Canada
Result	Cree–Assiniboine victory

Belligerents
Cree; Assiniboine	Canada

Commanders and leaders
Poundmaker; Fine Day	William Dillon Otter

Strength
50 to 250	350

Casualties and losses
5 dead; 3 wounded	8 dead; 14 wounded

National Historic Site of Canada
- Official name: Battle of Cut Knife Hill National Historic Site of Canada
- Designated: 1923

The District of Saskatchewan in 1885 (within the black diamonds) included the central section of Saskatchewan and extended into Alberta and Manitoba.

The Battle of Cut Knife, fought on May 2, 1885, during the North-West Rebellion, occurred when elements of North-West Mounted Police, Canadian militia, and Canadian regulars attacked a Cree and Assiniboine teepee settlement near Battleford in the North-West Territories' District of Saskatchewan. First Nations fighters forced the Canadian forces to retreat, with losses on both sides.

== Background ==
In the spring of 1885, Louis Riel, supported by many Métis living in the District of Saskatchewan, declared a provisional government, taking control of the area around Batoche. Riel was in contact with Cree and Assiniboine bands and other First Nations groups in Saskatchewan and Alberta. The Canadian government was concerned that the resistance would spread to First Nations across the North-West Territories.

The Government of Canada quickly made preparations to send troops to crush the resistance.

Bands of Cree, assembled under the leadership of Poundmaker, went to Battleford. The purpose of the visit was to lobby the Indian agent there, Mr. Rae, for better supplies (many members of the band were starving) and to discuss the political situation. The people of Battleford and some of the settlers in the surrounding area, hearing reports of large numbers of Cree and Assiniboine leaving reserves and making their way to Battleford, feared for their safety. On the night of March 30, 1885, townspeople abandoned the town and gathered for safety at North-West Mounted Police Fort Battleford. When Poundmaker and his party reached the town, Rae refused to come out of the fort to meet with them. He kept them waiting for two days. Poundmaker's people meanwhile suffered from hunger, having been refused supplies by Rae.

The abandoned homes and businesses were looted about this time. The identity of the looters is disputed. Some reports claimed Poundmaker's people were responsible, but one observer alleged that most of the looting had already been done by whites. Oral history accounts claim that the looting was done by Nakoda people, and that Poundmaker did his best to stop it. Either way, Poundmaker's people left the next day.

Meanwhile, bands of Assiniboine living south of Battleford heard about the Métis rebellion. A few of them killed a local farmer who had treated them harshly, and shot their Indian agent for beating a teenage girl. They then went north to Battleford to meet up with Poundmaker. A number of homes and businesses in Battleford were then looted and burned. There is some controversy as to who was responsible and as to the extent of the destruction.

The Canadian government sent Major-General Frederick Middleton to Saskatchewan to organize the suppression of the Métis rebellion. The small police force at Fort Battleford, suddenly responsible for the safety of nearly 500 civilians, and under incipient attack by Native insurgents who were freely moving around outside the fort, called on him for reinforcements and hastily set about forming a home guard to garrison the post.

Middleton detached a column under the leadership of Lieutenant-Colonel William Otter to relieve Battleford.

Otter's column consisted of some 763 men from the 2nd Battalion, "Queen's Own Rifles of Canada", 'B' Battery, Regiment of Canadian Artillery, 'C' Company of the Infantry School Corps, a party of sharpshooters from the 1st Battalion Governor General's Foot Guards, a small party of North-West Mounted Police under the command of Percy Neale, and assorted teamsters. The column travelled by rail to Swift Current, then began to march to Battleford on April 13,

Arriving on April 24, they found hundreds of civilians, white and Métis, crammed into Fort Battleford. Poundmaker's followers were absent from the immediate scene but it was thought that Poundmaker and many insurgents were camped on his reserve 45 km northwest of Battleford.

Overjoyed at Otter's arrival, the townspeople and settlers wanted revenge on the Indians for the losses in lives and material that they had suffered. Many of Otter's troops, inexperienced militiamen, were angry that they had "missed out on a fight".

Despite orders from General Middleton to stay in Battleford, Otter wired the Lieutenant-Governor of the Northwest Territories (who was also the Indian Commissioner), Edgar Dewdney, for permission to "punish Poundmaker." Permission was granted. Leaving a garrison in Battleford, Otter led a flying column of 392 men to attack the Cree and Assiniboine at Cut Knife Hill.

His force was made up of 75 North-West Mounted Police (cavalry), several small units of Canadian army regulars, and various volunteers and militia. He carried with him two 7-pounder field rifles and a Gatling gun. He set out on the afternoon of May 1. His plan was to march until dusk, rest until the moon rose, then continue on to attack the Cree and Assiniboine early in the morning, while they were asleep.

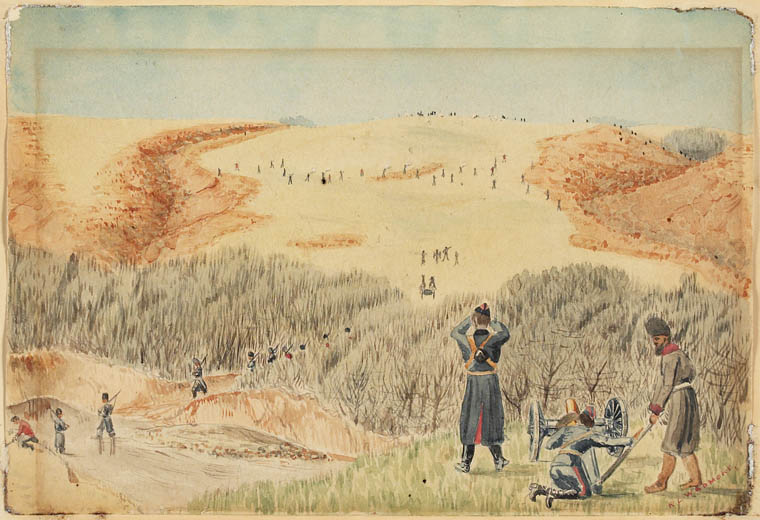
Battle of Cut Knife Creek

Meanwhile, the Cree were encamped on their reserve west of Battleford, on Cut Knife Creek. They had been joined by various other bands, including Assiniboine. Knowing there were thousands of Canadian soldiers in the area to fight the Métis' rebellion, they organized to protect themselves.

As was Cree custom, the war chief Fine Day replaced Poundmaker (the 'political chief') as leader until the fighting was over. He ordered the entire encampment to move across Cut Knife Creek to the west side. Behind the camp was Cut Knife Hill, and on both sides of it were ravines filled with bushes and trees. Altogether, the encampment contained nine bands of Cree and three of Assiniboine, numbering some 1500 men, women, and children.

== Battle ==
Just after dawn on May 2, Otter's column arrived. Otter had expected that the camp would be in the prairie on the east side of Cut Knife Creek. He had not anticipated that he would have to ford the creek. After his leading soldiers crossed the creek, they had to wade through a marsh before they reached the encampment. An old Cree man named Jacob with Long Hair woke up when he heard the sound of the soldiers crossing the creek, and he began to alert the fighters in the camp.

Colonel Otter set up two cannons and a Gatling gun, and they started firing on the sleeping camp. In the first few minutes, there was total confusion. The gunfire put holes in lodges and destroyed the camp. Women and children ran for the safety of the ravines. A group of Assiniboine warriors charged Otter's men to stop them from killing the women and children. The other warriors moved into the ravines, and Fine Day went to the top of Cut Knife Hill to direct the Cree counterattack.

The defenders fought in small groups. One group would run forward, attack the soldiers, then rush back into a ravine before the soldiers could shoot back at them. As soon as the soldiers tried to attack the Natives on one side, fighters on the other side would rush out of the other ravine and attack them from behind. Meantime, other fighters guarded the women and children by taking on the soldiers at the front tip of the column.

Otter could not direct the attack because he had little idea where the camp's defenders were nor of their numbers. Robert Jefferson, an eyewitness, reported that "not more than 50 [Natives] altogether, had taken part in the battle. This was understandable since few were armed." Douglas Light's research indicates some 243 Cree and Assiniboine men were present, and notes that a number of young boys also took part in the fight.

Otter formed his soldiers into a wedge. Two lines of soldiers and police faced the two ravines. Volunteers and militia guarded the rear, facing the marsh.

As the battle continued, Fine Day employed a flanking manoeuvre, whereby his fighters began to move along the two ravines, getting closer and closer to the soldiers. The fighters shot from behind trees and bushes, so that Otter's men seldom saw anyone to shoot at.

Eventually, the camp's defenders had almost encircled Otter's soldiers, and they were bogged down, with ravines on each side and the way out made difficult by the marsh. After six hours of fighting, Otter decided to order a withdrawal.

As the soldiers crossed the marsh, some of Poundmaker's fighters mounted their horses to go in pursuit. Poundmaker asked them to let Otter's men leave. They respected Poundmaker and allowed Otter to retreat to Battleford without attack. Some historians believe only Poundmaker's actions prevented an outright slaughter of Otter's troops.

Note: The Encyclopedia of Saskatchewan describes the terrain and initial encounter somewhat differently.

== Aftermath ==
Poundmaker and his people did not stay in the area but began to move away before the soldiers could recover and resume the attack. When Poundmaker heard of the Metis defeat at Batoche, he travelled to Battleford to give himself up.

== Conclusion ==
The Battle of Cut Knife was the Natives' most successful battle during the North-West Rebellion. They had the advantage of being on their own territory, but also several disadvantages: they were outnumbered, attacked by surprise, and short on ammunition. Fourteen of Otter's soldiers were wounded, and eight killed, including one abandoned to be mutilated by native women; three natives were wounded and five killed, including a Nez Perce who had come north from the United States some years earlier.

The battle instilled in some of Otter's men a respect for their enemy. Otter had expected Poundmaker's people to be caught off-guard and demoralized and to surrender quickly. But that had not happened.

However, despite suffering their greatest reverse during the campaign, sheer weight of numbers and better supplies favoured the North-West Field Force. In just a few weeks, the starving Cree went to Battleford to make peace with Major-General Middleton. Fine Day, the Cree war chief who had directed the battle, escaped to the United States. Poundmaker was arrested and jailed for seven months. Lieutenant-Colonel William Otter survived the battle and remained a prominent figure in the military, commanding The Royal Canadian Regiment in the Boer War, and acting as Director of Internment Camps in World War I.

Many people have compared this battle to the Battle of the Little Bighorn. There are some major similarities: in both cases, an army officer disobeyed orders; both tried to catch a native camp by surprise; both Custer and Otter badly misjudged the terrain and had to slow down their attacks; and both ended up being surrounded by warriors and had no idea where to charge. Otter, at least, knew when to retreat (and was allowed to do so), while Custer kept fighting and suffered hundreds of casualties. Of course, the battles were very different in their outcome. Whereas Custer himself was killed along with a third of his soldiers, Otter and most of his soldiers survived their battle and emerged with a new respect for native warriors.

== Legacy ==
"Cut Knife Battlefield. Named after Chief Cut Knife of the Sarcee in an historic battle with the Cree. On May 2, 1885, Lt. Col. W.D. Otter led 325 troops composed of North-West Mounted Police, "B" Battery, "C" Company, Foot Guards, Queen's Own and Battleford Rifles, against the Cree and Assiniboine under Poundmaker and Fine Day. After an engagement of six hours, the troops retreated to Battleford."

— National Historic Sites and Monuments Board

The site of the battle was designated a National Historic Site of Canada in 1923.

A bronze statue at Cartier Square Drill Hall in Ottawa, Ontario is dedicated to William B. Osgoode and John Rogers, members of the local Guards Company of Sharp-Shooters who were killed during the Battle of Cutknife Hill.

In the spring of 2008, Tourism, Parks, Culture and Sport Minister Christine Tell proclaimed in Duck Lake, that "the 125th commemoration, in 2010, of the 1885 Northwest Resistance is an excellent opportunity to tell the story of the prairie Métis and First Nations peoples' struggle with Government forces and how it has shaped Canada today."

At Cut Knife is the world's largest tomahawk, the Poundmaker Historical Centre and the Big Bear monument. There is also now, correctly located, a cairn erected by the Historic Sites and Monuments Board of Canada upon Cut Knife Hill overlooking the Poundmaker Battle site and Battle River valley.

A government announcement in early May 2019 stated that the Chief Poundmaker, who had been convicted of treason-felony, would be exonerated by Prime Minister Justin Trudeau and that a formal apology would be made on 23 May 2019.

== See also ==
- Battle of Frenchman's Butte
- North-West Rebellion
