= Waldheim station =

Railway station in Saskatchewan, Canada

Waldheim
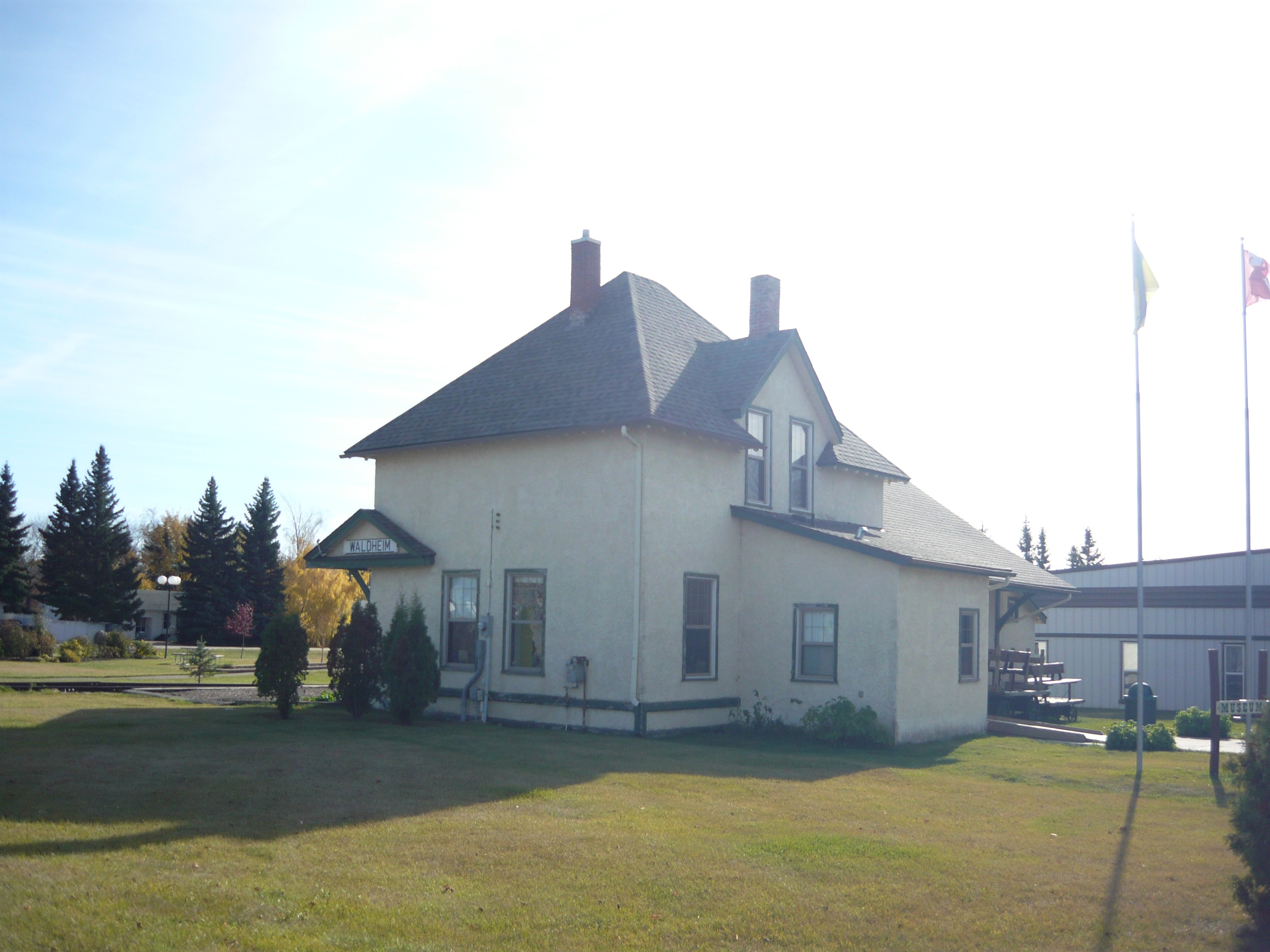
- Station Building (Now Library/Museum)

General information
- Location: 4002 Central Avenue; Waldheim, Saskatchewan
- Coordinates: 52.620762°N 106.655374°W
- Line: Canadian National Railway

History
- Opened: 1912
- Closed: 1976

Former services
Preceding station	Canadian National Railway	Following station
Hepburn toward Saskatoon	Saskatoon – Carlton	Laird toward Carlton
Location

The Waldheim station is a former railway station in Waldheim, Saskatchewan. It was built by the Canadian Northern Railway. The 1 1/2-storey, stucco-clad, wood-frame building was built as a third class station, with the waiting, ticketing and cargo area on the main floor and the private living area for the station agent split between the main and second floor. The building served as a railway station from 1912 until 1976; it is now used as a library and museum. The building was designated a Municipal Heritage Property in 1983.
