= Tipamahto Aski 95A =

Coordinates: 52°52′02″N 106°28′34″W

- Indian reserve
- Tipamahto Aski Indian Reserve No. 95A
- Location in Saskatchewan
- First Nation: One Arrow
- Country: Canada
- Province: Saskatchewan

Area
  - Total: 129 ha (320 acres)

Tipamahto Aski 95A is an Indian reserve of the One Arrow First Nation in Saskatchewan. It is 15 kilometres northwest of Duck Lake.
