= Rural Municipality of Laird No. 404 =

Rural municipality in Saskatchewan, Canada

Laird No. 404
- Rural municipality
- Rural Municipality of Laird No. 404
- Location of the RM of Laird No. 404 in Saskatchewan
- Coordinates: 52.598°N 106.773°W
- Country: Canada
- Province: Saskatchewan
- Census division: 15
- SARM division: 5
- Formed: December 12, 1910

Government
  - Reeve: Terry Knippel
  - Governing body: RM of Laird No. 404 Council
  - Administrator: Bertha Buhler
  - Office location: Waldheim

Area (2016)
  - Land: 729.98 km^{2} (281.85 sq mi)

Population (2016)
  - Total: 1,387
  - Density: 1.9/km^{2} (4.9/sq mi)
- Time zone: CST
  - Summer (DST): CST
- Area codes: 306 and 639

The Rural Municipality of Laird No. 404 (2016 population: 1,387) is a rural municipality (RM) in the Canadian province of Saskatchewan within Census Division No. 15 and SARM Division No. 5.

== History ==
The RM of Laird No. 404 incorporated as a rural municipality on December 12, 1910.

== Demographics ==
Population history (1981–2016)
Year	Pop.	±%
1981	1,164	—
1986	1,214	+4.3%
1991	1,102	−9.2%
1996	1,070	−2.9%
2001	1,154	+7.9%
2006	1,136	−1.6%
2011	1,240	+9.2%
2016	1,387	+11.9%
Source: Statistics Canada via Saskatchewan Bureau of Statistics

In the 2021 Census of Population conducted by Statistics Canada, the RM of Laird No. 404 had a population of 1,304 living in 396 of its 428 total private dwellings, a change of −6% from its 2016 population of 1,387. With a land area of 725.42 km^{2} (280.09 sq mi), it had a population density of 1.8/km^{2} (4.7/sq mi) in 2021.

In the 2016 Census of Population, the RM of Laird No. 404 recorded a population of 1,387 living in 400 of its 415 total private dwellings, a 11.9% change from its 2011 population of 1,240. With a land area of 729.98 km^{2} (281.85 sq mi), it had a population density of 1.9/km^{2} (4.9/sq mi) in 2016.

== Geography ==
=== Communities and localities ===
The following urban municipalities are surrounded by the RM.

Towns

- Hepburn
- Waldheim

Villages

- Laird

The following unincorporated communities are within the RM.

Localities

- Greenfeld
- Mennon

== Attractions ==
- Fort Carlton
- Hepburn Museum of Wheat
- Waldheim Regional Park
- Shekinah Retreat Centre

== Government ==
The RM of Laird No. 404 is governed by an elected municipal council and an appointed administrator that meets on the second Thursday of every month. The reeve of the RM is Terry Knippel while its administrator is Bertha Buhler. The RM's office is located in Waldheim.

== Transportation ==
- Saskatchewan Highway 12
- Saskatchewan Highway 312
- Saskatchewan Highway 375

== See also ==
- List of rural municipalities in Saskatchewan
