= Laird, Saskatchewan =

Village in Saskatchewan, Canada

Laird
- Village
- Village of Laird
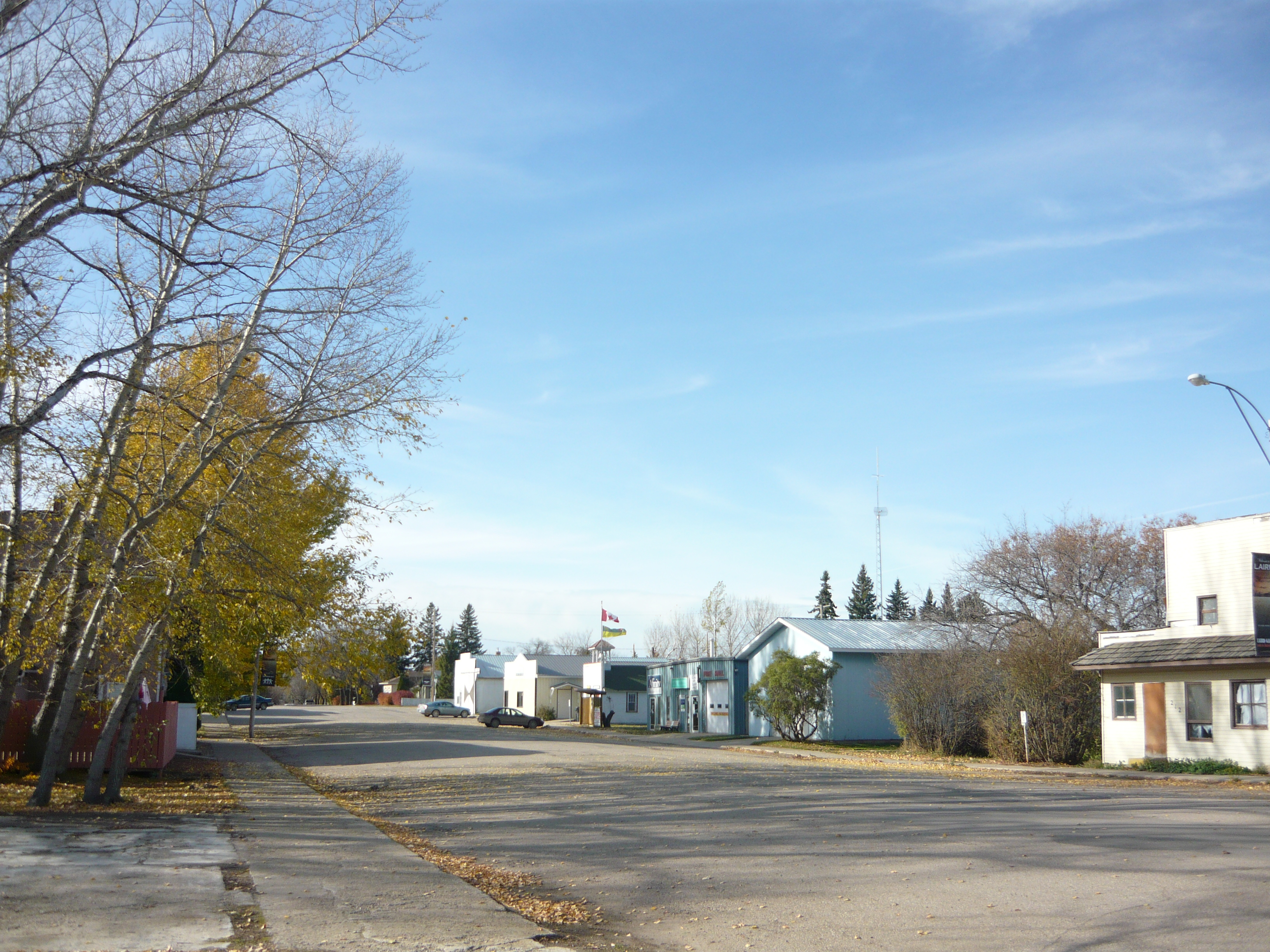
- Main Street, Laird
- Motto: "The community that pulls together"
- Location of Laird Laird (Canada)
- Coordinates: 52°42′53″N 106°35′23″W
- Country: Canada
- Province: Saskatchewan
- Region: Central
- Census division: 15
- Rural municipality: Laird No. 404

Government
  - Type: Municipal
  - Governing body: Laird Village Council
  - Mayor: Kirk Walters

Area
  - Total: 1.29 km^{2} (0.50 sq mi)

Population (2016)
  - Total: 267
  - Density: 207.6/km^{2} (538/sq mi)
- Time zone: UTC-6 (CST)
- Postal code: S0K 2H0
- Area code: 306
- Highways: Highway 312
- Railways: (Pulled)

Laird (2016 population: 267) is a village in the Canadian province of Saskatchewan within the Rural Municipality of Laird No. 404 and Census Division No. 15. The village is named after David Laird, Lieutenant Governor of the Northwest Territories.

== Demographics ==
Population history (1981–2016)
Year	Pop.	±%
1981	233	—
1986	266	+14.2%
1991	221	−16.9%
1996	235	+6.3%
2001	236	+0.4%
2006	207	−12.3%
2011	287	+38.6%
2016	267	−7.0%
Source: Statistics Canada via Saskatchewan Bureau of Statistics

In the 2021 Census of Population conducted by Statistics Canada, Laird had a population of 265 living in 115 of its 121 total private dwellings, a change of −0.7% from its 2016 population of 267. With a land area of 1.23 km^{2} (0.47 sq mi), it had a population density of 215.4/km^{2} (558.0/sq mi) in 2021.

In the 2016 Census of Population, the Village of Laird recorded a population of 267 living in 116 of its 118 total private dwellings, a −7.5% change from its 2011 population of 287. With a land area of 1.29 km^{2} (0.50 sq mi), it had a population density of 207.0/km^{2} (536.1/sq mi) in 2016.

== See also ==
- List of communities in Saskatchewan
- List of villages in Saskatchewan
