= Desmond Morton (historian) =

Canadian historian (1937–2019)

Desmond Morton OC CD FRSC
- Morton c. 1955

5th Principal of Erindale College, Toronto
- In office 1986–1995
- Preceded by: Paul W. Fox
- Succeeded by: Roger L. Beck (acting)

Personal details
- Born: Desmond Dillon Paul Morton; September 10, 1937 Calgary, Alberta, Canada
- Died: September 4, 2019 (aged 81) Montreal, Quebec, Canada
- Party: New Democratic Party
- Spouses: Janet Smith (m. 1967; died 1990); Gael Eakin (m. 1999)

Academic background
- Education: Royal Military College of Canada; Keble College, Oxford; London School of Economics
- Thesis: Authority and Policy in the Canadian Militia, 1868–1904 (1968)
- Doctoral advisor: Kenneth Bourne

Academic work
- Discipline: History
- Sub-discipline: Canadian history; military history; political history
- Institutions: Erindale College, Toronto; McGill University
- Military career
- Service: Canadian Army
- Service years: 1954–1964
- Rank: Captain / Honorary Colonel

Desmond Dillon Paul Morton OC CD FRSC (September 10, 1937 – September 4, 2019) was a Canadian historian and political advisor who specialized in the history of the Canadian military, as well as the history of Canadian political and industrial relations.

== Life and career ==
Born on September 10, 1937, in Calgary, Alberta, Morton was the son of a Brigadier General, and the grandson of General Sir William Dillon Otter. A Rhodes Scholar at Keble College, Oxford, Morton graduated from the Collège militaire royal de St-Jean, the Royal Military College of Canada, and the London School of Economics. He received his doctorate from the University of London. He spent ten years in the Canadian Army (1954–1964 retiring as a Captain) prior to beginning his teaching career. He was named Honorary Colonel of 8 Wing of the Canadian Air Force at CFB Trenton in 2002. He received the Canadian Forces' Decoration in 2004 for 12 years total military service.

Morton was the Hiram Mills Professor of History at McGill University, as well as the founding director of the McGill Institute for the Study of Canada, established in 1994, in Montreal, Quebec. Following his retirement, he continued to serve at McGill as a professor emeritus. Prior to that, he was Principal of Erindale College, University of Toronto, from 1986 to 1994. He served as president of the Canadian Historical Association from 1978–1979.

Before beginning his teaching career, Morton served as an advisor to Tommy Douglas of the New Democratic Party. From 1964 to 1966, he served as assistant secretary of the Ontario New Democratic Party. After the success of the famous 1964 NDP Riverdale by-election, Morton wrote and published The Riverdale Story, which detailed how the party's organizing and canvassing changed the way campaigns in Canada are run. In the 1970s, he worked with David Lewis, Stephen Lewis, and other party leaders to oppose The Waffle, a left-wing faction within the NDP. In the 1980s, he informally advised Brian Mulroney of the Progressive Conservatives.

Morton was the author of over thirty-five books on Canada, including the popular A Short History of Canada. In 1994, he won the C.P. Stacey Prize for his history of Canadian soldiers during the First World War, When Your Number's Up. He wrote prolifically about the First World War, considering it of great importance in Canadian history. He once wrote: "For Canadians, Vimy Ridge was a nation-building experience. For some, then and later, it symbolized the fact that the Great War was also Canada's war of independence".

In 1996, he was appointed an Officer of the Order of Canada. Morton was elected a fellow of the Royal Society of Canada in 1985.

Morton's widow Gael Eakin, to whom he was married for 20 years, announced that he died on September 4, 2019, six days short of his 82nd birthday.

== Published works ==
- "French Canada and the Canadian militia, 1868–1914", Histoire Sociale/Social History 3 (June 1969): 32–50, ISSN 0018-2257
- "Des Canadiens Errants: French Canadian Troops in the North-West Campaign of 1885," Journal of Canadian Studies 5, no. 3 (Aug. 1970): 28–39
- "Aid to the Civil Power: The Canadian Militia in Support of Social Order, 1867–1914," Canadian Historical Review 52, no. 4 (Dec. 1970): 407–25.
- Ministers and Generals: Politics and the Canadian Militia, 1868–1904, ISBN 0-8020-5228-2, (1970)
- The Last War Drum: The North West Campaign of 1885 (1972)
- with R.H. Roy, eds., Telegrams of the North-West Campaign of 1885 (Toronto: Champlain Society, 1972).
- "The Supreme Penalty: Canadian Deaths by Firing Squad in the First World War," Queen’s Quarterly, 79, no. 2 (Autumn 1972): 345–52
- Mayor Howland: The Citizens' Candidate (1973)
- The Canadian General Sir William Otter (1974)
- NDP The Dream of Power (1974)
- The Queen Versus Louis Riel, ISBN 0-8020-6232-6, (1974)
- Critical Years 1857–1873 (1977)
- "Kicking and Complaining: Demobilization Riots in the Canadian Expeditionary Force, 1918–1919," Canadian Historical Review 61, no. 3 (Sept. 1980): 334–60
- Rebellions in Canada, ISBN 0-531-00449-X (1980)
- The Supreme Penalty: Canadian Deaths by Firing Squad in the First World War (1980)
- Canada and War: A Military and Political History, ISBN 0-409-85240-6, (1981)
- Labour in Canada (1982)
- A Peculiar Kind of Politics: Canada's Overseas Ministry in the First World War, ISBN 0-8020-5586-9, (1982)
- Years of Conflict: 1911–1921 (1983)
- New France and War, ISBN 0-531-04804-7, (1984)
- Working People, ISBN 0-88879-040-6, (1980) (rev. 1984, 1990, 2003)
- The New Democrats 1961–1986: The Politics of Change (1986)
- Winning the Second Battle: Canadian Veterans and the Return to Civilian Life, 1915–30, ISBN 0-8020-6634-8, (1987) (with Glenn T. Wright)
- Towards Tomorrow: Canada in a Changing World History, ISBN 0-7747-1281-3, (1988)
- Marching to Armageddon: Canadians and the Great War 1914–1919, ISBN 0-88619-211-0, (1989) (2nd Ed 1992) (With J. L. Granatstein)
- A Military History of Canada, ISBN 0-7710-6515-9, (1992) (2nd Ed. 1999)
- Morgentaler vs Borowski, ISBN 0-7710-6513-2, (1992)
- Silent Battle: Canadian Prisoners of War in Germany, 1914–1919, ISBN 1-895555-17-5, (1992)
- When Your Number's Up: The Canadian Soldier in the First World War, ISBN 0-394-22388-8, (1994)
- Shaping a Nation: A Short History of Canada's Constitution, ISBN 1-895642-10-8, (1996)
- The United Nations: Its History and the Canadians Who Shaped It, ISBN 1-55074-222-1, (1995)
- Our Canada: The Heritage of Her People 0-8886-6643-8, (1996)
- Victory 1945: Canadians from War to Peace, ISBN 0-00-255069-5, (1996) (with J. L. Granatstein)
- Wheels: The Car in Canada, ISBN 1-895642-03-5, (1998)
- Who Speaks for Canada?, ISBN 0-7710-6502-7, (1998) (2nd Ed. 2001) (with Morton Weinfeld)
- Working People: An Illustrated History of the Canadian Labour Movement (1998)
- Canada: A Millennium Portrait, ISBN 0-88866-647-0, (1999)
- Understanding Canadian Defence (2000)
- A Short History of Canada, ISBN 0-7710-6509-4,(2001)
- Bloody Victory: Canadians and the D-Day Campaign 1944, ISBN 1-895555-56-6, (2002)
- They Were So Young: Montrealers Remember WWII (2002)
- Canada and the Two World Wars, ISBN 1-55263-509-0, (2003) (with J.L. Granatstein)
- Understanding Canadian Defence (2003)
- Fight or Pay, ISBN 0-7748-1108-0, (2004)
- The Mystery of Frankenberg's Canadian Airman, ISBN 1-55028-884-9, (2005)
- Billet Pour le Front (Ticket for the Front), ISBN 2-922865-40-1, (2005) (French)
- "Is History Another Word for Experience? Morton's Confessions," The Canadian Historical Review Volume 92, Number 4, December 2011 in Project MUSE
