= Greenfeld, Saskatchewan =

Community in Saskatchewan, Canada

Greenfeld
- Location of Greenfeld in Saskatchewan Greenfeld (Canada)
- Coordinates: 52°26′N 106°38′W
- Country: Canada
- Province: Saskatchewan
- Rural municipality: Laird No. 404
- Post office Founded: N/A
- Post office Founded: N/A

Area
  - Total: 1.29 km^{2} (0.50 sq mi)

Population (2001)
  - Total: 236
  - Density: 183.5/km^{2} (475/sq mi)
- Time zone: CST
- Postal code: S0K 2H0
- Area code: 306
- Highways: Highway

Greenfeld is a hamlet in the Canadian province of Saskatchewan. It is located in the Rural Municipality of Laird No. 404.

== See also ==
- List of communities in Saskatchewan
- List of hamlets in Saskatchewan
