= Rural Municipality of Fish Creek No. 402 =

Rural municipality in Saskatchewan, Canada

Fish Creek No. 402
- Rural municipality
- Rural Municipality of Fish Creek No. 402
- Location of the RM of Fish Creek No. 402 in Saskatchewan
- Coordinates: 52.610°N 106.007°W
- Country: Canada
- Province: Saskatchewan
- Census division: 15
- SARM division: 5
- Formed: January 1, 1913

Government
  - Reeve: Brian Domotor
  - Governing body: RM of Fish Creek No. 402 Council
  - Administrator: Gartner Lois
  - Office location: Wakaw

Area (2016)
  - Land: 597.9 km^{2} (230.9 sq mi)

Population (2016)
  - Total: 345
  - Density: 0.6/km^{2} (1.6/sq mi)
- Time zone: CST
  - Summer (DST): CST
- Area codes: 306 and 639

The Rural Municipality of Fish Creek No. 402 (2016 population: 345) is a rural municipality (RM) in the Canadian province of Saskatchewan within Census Division No. 15 and SARM Division No. 5.

== History ==
The RM of Fish Creek No. 402 incorporated as a rural municipality on January 1, 1913.

== Geography ==
=== Communities and localities ===
The following urban municipalities are surrounded by the RM.

Villages

- Alvena

The following unincorporated communities are within the RM.

Localities

- Carpenter
- Fish Creek
- Sokal

== Demographics ==
Population history (1981–2016)
Year	Pop.	±%
1981	510	—
1986	480	−5.9%
1991	434	−9.6%
1996	380	−12.4%
2001	382	+0.5%
2006	307	−19.6%
2011	304	−1.0%
2016	345	+13.5%
Source: Statistics Canada via Saskatchewan Bureau of Statistics

In the 2021 Census of Population conducted by Statistics Canada, the RM of Fish Creek No. 402 had a population of 364 living in 137 of its 176 total private dwellings, a change of 5.5% from its 2016 population of 345. With a land area of 583.95 km^{2} (225.46 sq mi), it had a population density of 0.6/km^{2} (1.6/sq mi) in 2021.

In the 2016 Census of Population, the RM of Fish Creek No. 402 recorded a population of 345 living in 144 of its 167 total private dwellings, a 13.5% change from its 2011 population of 304. With a land area of 597.9 km^{2} (230.9 sq mi), it had a population density of 0.6/km^{2} (1.5/sq mi) in 2016.

== Attractions ==
- Fish Creek (Saskatchewan)
- Battle of Fish Creek
- Seager Wheeler Farm
- Wakaw Heritage Museum & Diefenbaker Law Office
- Our Lady of Lourdes Shrine
- Duck Lake Regional Interpretive Center
- Batoche National Historic Site
- Wakaw Lake Regional Park

== Government ==
The RM of Fish Creek No. 402 is governed by an elected municipal council and an appointed administrator that meets on the first Tuesday of every month. The reeve of the RM is Brian Domotor while its administrator is Gartner Lois. The RM's office is located in Wakaw.

== Transportation ==
- Saskatchewan Highway 2
- Saskatchewan Highway 41
- Saskatchewan Highway 312

== See also ==
- List of rural municipalities in Saskatchewan
