= One Arrow 95-1D =

Indian reserve in Saskatchewan, Canada

Coordinates: 52°48′08″N 106°04′45″W

- Indian reserve
- One Arrow Indian Reserve No. 95-1D
- Location in Saskatchewan
- First Nation: One Arrow
- Country: Canada
- Province: Saskatchewan

Area
  - Total: 193 ha (480 acres)

Population (2016)
  - Total: 0
  - Density: 0.0/km^{2} (0.0/sq mi)

One Arrow 95-1D is an Indian reserve of the One Arrow First Nation in Saskatchewan. It is about 11 kilometres (6.8 mi) east of Duck Lake. In the 2016 Canadian Census, it recorded a population of 0 living in 1 of its 1 total private dwellings.

== See also ==
- List of Indian reserves in Saskatchewan
