= Sounding Sky Reserve =

Indian reserve in Saskatchewan, Canada

Coordinates: 52°07′33″N 106°41′40″W

- Indian reserve
- Sounding Sky Indian Reserve
- Location in Saskatchewan
- First Nation: One Arrow
- Country: Canada
- Province: Saskatchewan

Area
  - Total: 0.1 ha (0.25 acres)

The Sounding Sky Reserve is an Indian reserve of the One Arrow First Nation in Saskatchewan. An urban reserve, it is in the city of Saskatoon.

== See also ==
- List of Indian reserves in Saskatchewan
