= John B. Boucher =

Canadian Métis leader

- Born: June 27, 1938
- Died: February 3, 2010 (aged 71); St. Louis, Saskatchewan, Canada
- Occupations: Metis leader and elder, Order of Canada recipient

John B. Boucher was a Canadian Métis leader. He was active in Métis politics since the 1960s. He sat on the Aboriginal Advisory Board for the RCMP and was a member of the Senate of the Métis Nation—Saskatchewan as well as a member of the Métis National Council. He received the Order of Canada in 2002.

During Nelson Mandela's visit to Canada on September 24, 1998 Senator Boucher tied a ceinture fléchée around Mandela's waist which President Mandela later wore during his address to the House of Commons of Canada.

== See also ==
- St. Louis, Saskatchewan
