= Gabriel Bridge =

Bridge in Saskatchewan, Canada

Coordinates: 52.6689175°N 106.1254758°W

Gabriel Bridge (between Wakaw and Rosthern in Saskatchewan, Canada) is a steel truss bridge named after Gabriel Dumont. Gabriel Bridge replaced the Gabriel Ferry Crossing in 1969.

Gabriel Dumont operated a ferry on the South Saskatchewan River (in the same area as the bridge) from the early 1870s to 1883. According to Dumont's 1878 licence, the ferry was a scow measuring 7.6m (23 feet) by 4m (12 feet). Ferry service continued near Gabriel's crossing until the completion of Gabriel's Bridge on Highway 312 in 1969.

== See also ==
- List of crossings of the South Saskatchewan River
