= One Arrow 95 =

Indian reserve in Saskatchewan, Canada

Coordinates: 52°44′29″N 106°02′09″W

- Indian reserve
- One Arrow Indian Reserve No. 95
- Location in Saskatchewan
- First Nation: One Arrow
- Country: Canada
- Province: Saskatchewan

Area
  - Total: 5,435 ha (13,430 acres)

Population (2016)
  - Total: 680
  - Density: 13/km^{2} (32/sq mi)
- Community Well-Being Index: 49

One Arrow 95 is an Indian reserve of the One Arrow First Nation in Saskatchewan. It is about 53 kilometres (33 mi) south-west of Prince Albert. In the 2016 Canadian Census, it recorded a population of 680 living in 163 of its 168 total private dwellings. In the same year, its Community Well-Being index was calculated at 49 of 100, compared to 58.4 for the average First Nations community and 77.5 for the average non-Indigenous community.

== See also ==
- List of Indian reserves in Saskatchewan
