= Alvena =

Village in Saskatchewan, Canada

- Village
- Village of Alvena
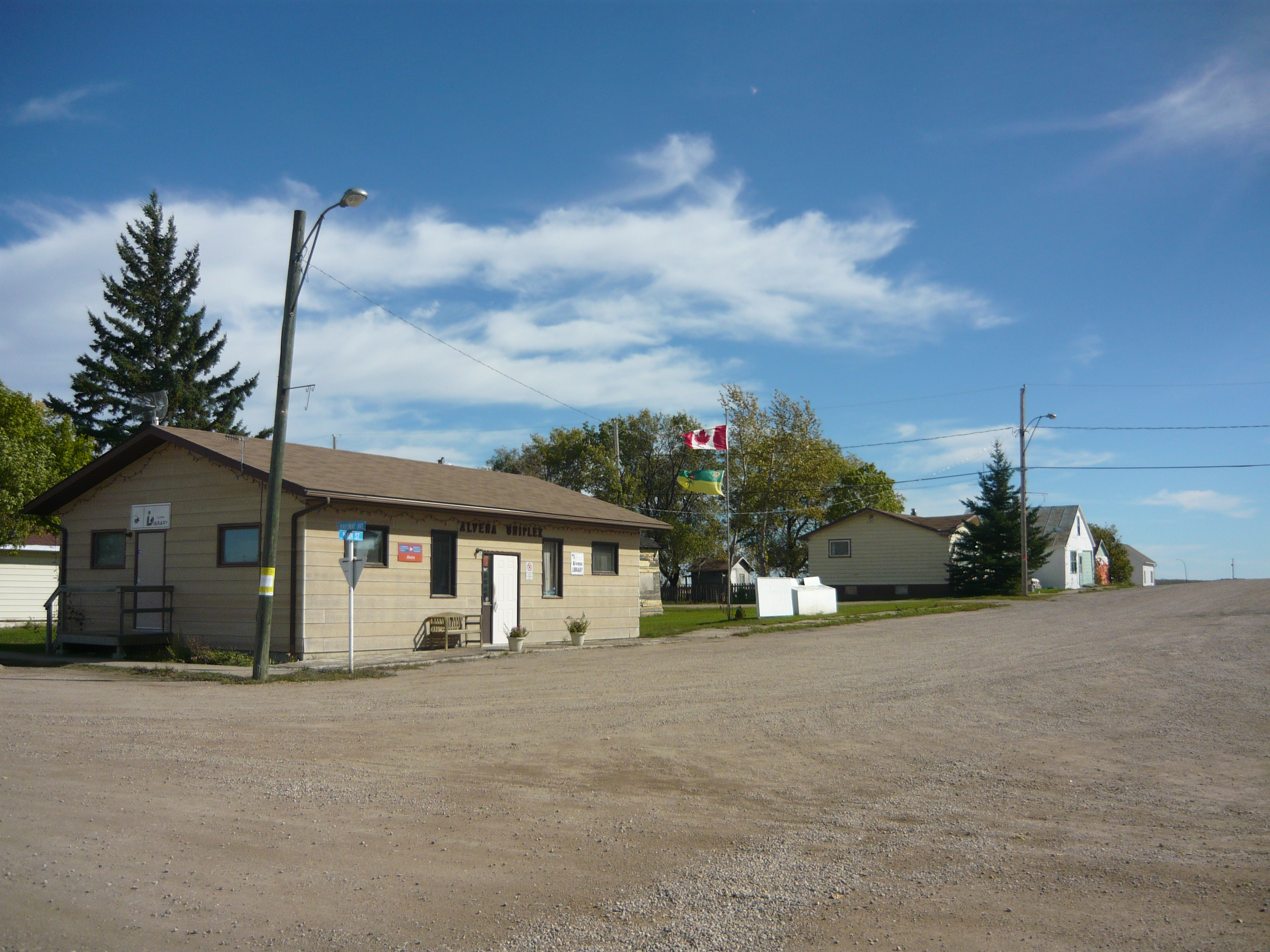
- Main Street Alvena

- Location of Alvena Alvena (Canada)
- Coordinates: 52.51667°N 106.016667°W
- Country: Canada
- Province: Saskatchewan
- Region: Central
- Census division: 15
- Rural Municipality: Fish Creek
- Established (Post Office): 1887-10-01
- Incorporate (Village): 1936

Population (2006)
  - Total: 55
  - Density: 128/km^{2} (330/sq mi)
- Time zone: CST
- Area code: 306

Alvena (2016 population: 60) is a village in the Canadian province of Saskatchewan within the Rural Municipality of Fish Creek No. 402 and Census Division No. 15. It is approximately 60 kilometres (37 mi) northeast of Saskatoon.

== History ==
Many early settlers to Alvena were of Ukrainian descent. Many were peasant farmers in the Austro-Hungarian Empire. Others were from Poland and they erected Roman Catholic Churches in the area. Earlier settlers along the South Saskatchewan River were Métis. Many of these families were involved in the April 24, 1885 Battle of Fish Creek which occurred in Tourond's Coulee, a few miles west of what later became Alvena. Alvena incorporated as a village on July 1, 1936.

== Demographics ==
Population history (1981–2016)
Year	Pop.	±%
1981	94	—
1986	75	−20.2%
1991	79	+5.3%
1996	79	+0.0%
2001	86	+8.9%
2006	55	−36.0%
2011	55	+0.0%
2016	60	+9.1%
Source: Statistics Canada via Saskatchewan Bureau of Statistics

In the 2021 Census of Population conducted by Statistics Canada, Alvena had a population of 75 living in 34 of its 52 total private dwellings, a change of 25% from its 2016 population of 60. With a land area of 0.43 km^{2} (0.17 sq mi), it had a population density of 174.4/km^{2} (451.7/sq mi) in 2021.

In the 2016 Census of Population, the Village of Alvena recorded a population of 60 living in 32 of its 46 total private dwellings, a 8.3% change from its 2011 population of 55. With a land area of 0.43 km^{2} (0.17 sq mi), it had a population density of 139.5/km^{2} (361.4/sq mi) in 2016.

== Notable people ==
- Edward Bayda – former Chief Justice of Saskatchewan
- Ed Tchorzewski - former Saskatchewan Minister of Finance, and President of the New Democratic Party

== See also ==
- List of communities in Saskatchewan
- List of villages in Saskatchewan
