= William Dillon Otter =

Canadian general (1843–1929)

General Sir William Dillon Otter KCB CVO VD
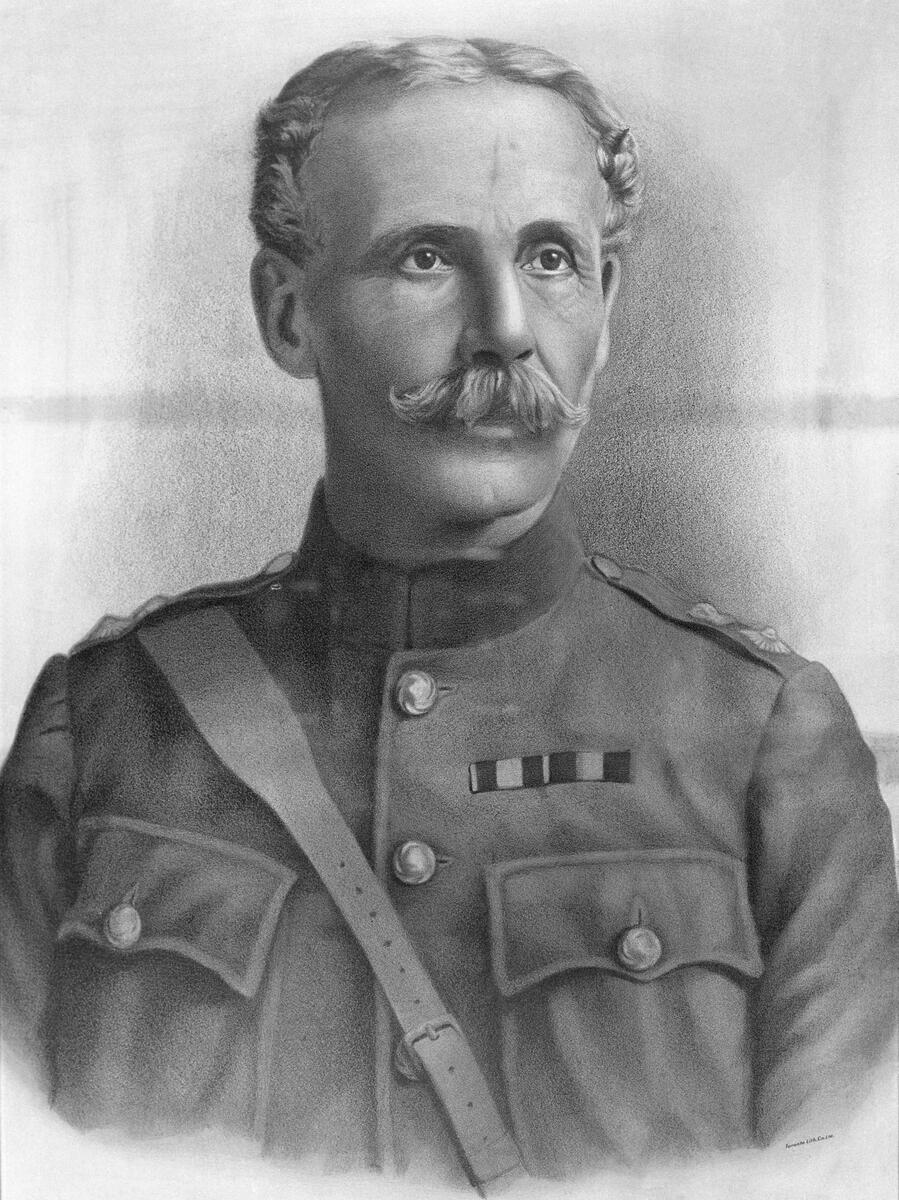
- William Dillon Otter in 1900
- Born: December 3, 1843; The Corners, Canada West
- Died: May 5, 1929 (aged 85); Toronto, Ontario
- Military career
- Allegiance: Canada
- Branch: Canadian Militia
- Service years: 1866–1902
- Rank: General
- Commands: Chief of the General Staff; Royal Canadian Regiment of Infantry
- Conflicts: Fenian Raids: Battle of Ridgeway; North-West Rebellion: Battle of Cut Knife; Second Boer War: Battle of Paardeberg; Battle of Driefontein
- Awards: Knight Commander of the Order of the Bath; Commander of the Royal Victorian Order; Volunteer Officers' Decoration

General Sir William Dillon Otter KCB CVO VD (December 3, 1843 – May 6, 1929) was a professional Canadian soldier who became the first Canadian-born Chief of the General Staff, the head of the Canadian Militia. He led troops in the suppression of the 1885 rebellion.

== Military career ==
Otter was born near Clinton, Canada West. His parents were Anna Louisa, née de la Hooke (1824–1907) and Alfred William Otter (1815–1866), both English immigrants who married in Ontario on 15 September 1842. He began his military career in the Non-Permanent Active Militia in Toronto in 1864. Captain William Otter was Adjutant of the Queen's Own Rifles of Toronto in 1866. He first saw combat with them at the Battle of Ridgeway during the Fenian Raids.

He joined the Permanent Force as an infantry officer when Canada established its own professional infantry unit in 1883. On May 2, 1885, he led a Canadian force of more than 300 in the Battle of Cut Knife against a Cree and Assiniboine camp defended by Poundmaker and Fine-Day. Otter's tactics were ineffective against the defending warriors.

He was appointed as the first commanding officer of the Royal Canadian Regiment of Infantry in 1893.

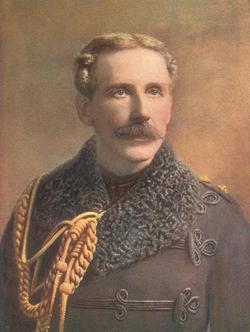
Lieutenant Colonel William Dillon Otter

During the Second Boer War, Otter, by then a lieutenant colonel, commanded the 2nd (Special Service) Battalion of The Royal Canadian Regiment of Infantry in South Africa. Otter played an important part in the Battle of Paardeberg.

He became the first Canadian-born officer to command Canada's military in 1908, and retired in 1910 as a major general. In 1922 he was the second Canadian, after Sir Arthur Currie, to be appointed a full general. Otter had the reputation of being something of a martinet – due mainly to his desire that the young Canadian Army should not show up badly when compared to British troops.

He wrote The Guide: A Manual for the Canadian Militia (Infantry) Embracing the Interior Economy, Duties, Discipline, Drills and Parades, Dress, Books, and Correspondence of a Battalion with Regulations for Marches, Transport & Encampment, Also Forms & Bugle Calls in 1914, which includes sections on discipline, courts martial, offences, complaints, and defaulters.

During the First World War he came out of retirement to command operations for the internment of enemy nationals resident in Canada.

Otter headed the Otter Commission. The Otter Commission was tasked to establish links of perpetuation from the units of Canadian Expeditionary Force back to the institutionally separate units of the Canadian Militia in the years following the First World War. This establishment of perpetuation, based primarily on geographical connections through original recruiting areas of the CEF infantry battalions and CEF mounted regiments, provided a basis by which the achievements and battle honours of the CEF units transferred back to the units of the standing Militia. Without this work of the Otter Commission the CEF and its achievements would have had no continuance with existing units of the Canadian Army today.

General Sir William Otter died on 6 May 1929.

== Freemason ==
Otter was initiated into the Ionic Lodge of Freemasonry in Toronto in February 1869. He became Worshipful Master in 1873.

== Legacy ==
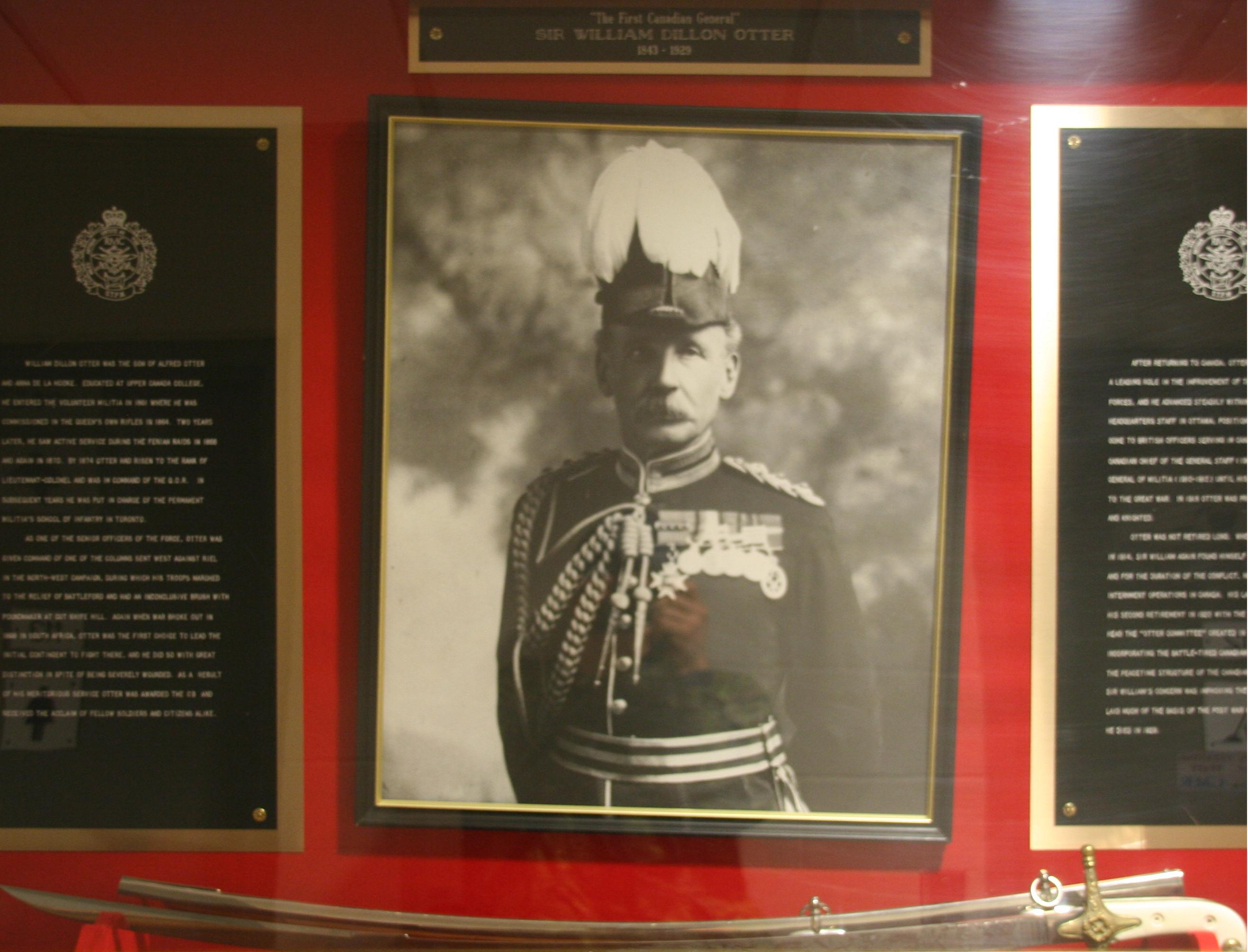
William Dillon Otter sword at Royal Military College of Canada

Otter Squadron, composed of University Training Plan Non Commissioned Member (UTPNCM) Officer Cadets, at the Royal Military College of Canada in Kingston, Ontario, was named in his honour and the Cadet Squadron Leader of Otter Squadron is permitted to carry his sword on graduation parade.

== Family connections ==
In October 1895 he married Marian Porter, daughter of James Porter & Agnes Dryden. They had three sons and one daughter. Otter was the grandfather of Canadian Military historian Desmond Morton.

== Honours ==
Coat of arms of William Dillon Otter
Crest A crescent Or. Escutcheon Or on a bend Gules three crescents of the first. Motto Crescit Eundo

Ribbon bar:

- Order of the Bath - Knight Commander
- Royal Victorian Order - Commander
- Canada General Service Medal - Bars for 1866 and 1870
- North West Canada Medal - Bar for Saskatchewan
- Queen's South Africa Medal - Bars for Johannesburg, Paardeberg, Driefontein, and Cape Colony
- King Edward VII Coronation Medal
- Volunteer Officers' Decoration

Military offices
Preceded by Sir Percy Lake	Chief of the General Staff (Canada); 1908–1910	Succeeded by Sir Colin Mackenzie
