= Fine-Day =

Cree war chief

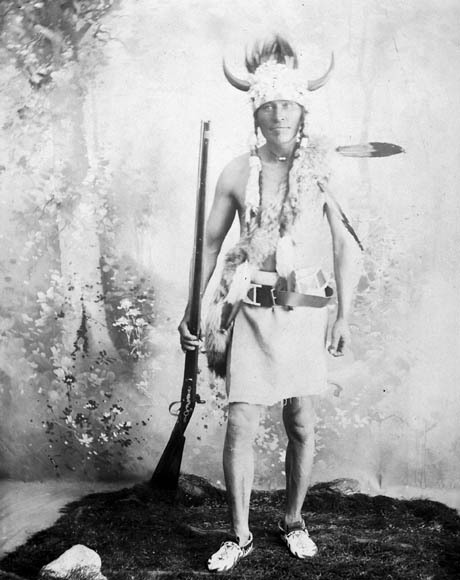
Kamiokisihkwew in 1896

Fine Day or kâ-miyokîsihkwêw (c. 1856 – c. 1942) was a Cree war chief of the River People band of Plains Cree. He participated in the North-West Rebellion of 1885. During the Battle of Cut Knife, he acted as the Battle Chief, taking control of the war fighting parties from the political chief, Poundmaker. When Fine Day's men gained the upper hand and started to pursue the retreating Canadian soldiers, he was restrained by Poundmaker from doing so.

Described by a contemporary as "brave in all things," he was a skilled warrior, hunter, trapper and (in later life) a shaman.

Fine Day's memories of the North-West Rebellion were published by the Canadian North-West Historical Society in 1926.

David G. Mandelbaum, in the introduction to his extensive study of the Plains Cree, cites Fine Day as his principal informant.
