= Hiram Mills =

Major Hiram Mills (c. 1796–1882) was an American-born philanthropist.

Originally from Virginia, Mills moved to Montreal at the outbreak of the American Civil War in 1861. Mills inherited a substantial sum from his father, who had been a plantation owner, but generally declined to discuss his previous career and asked that no obituary be published for him.

Mills was a generous, but eccentric, philanthropist. The Irish Canadian newspaper reported that he had been a board member of every Protestant charity in Montreal, and in 1879 he helped finance the establishment of a new hospital in the western end of the city. At one point, Mills offered $20,000 to the city to purchase bread for the poor, but attached so many conditions to the bequest that it was refused.

Mills joined a Southern Masonic Lodge in 1819 and, upon his death in 1882, it was reported that he had been amongst the oldest, if not the oldest, Freemason in Canada.

Mills bequeathed $43,000 to McGill College (now McGill University) to establish a gold medal, a scholarship, and an endowed chair in classics. Mills left a further $30,000 to the Western Hospital and $20,000 to the Anglican church, but left no provision for his widow. McGill College and the Anglican synod established a pension of $450 per annum for Mrs. Mills.

Mills is interred in a mausoleum at Mount Royal Cemetery.
