= Frederick Middleton =

British Army general (1825–1898)

Lieutenant-General Sir Frederick Middleton KCMG CB
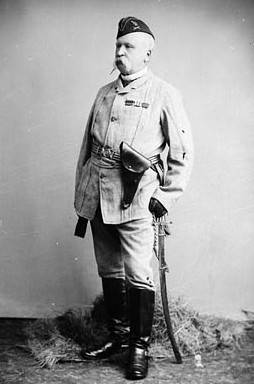
- Born: 4 November 1825; Belfast, Ireland
- Died: 25 January 1898 (aged 72); London, England
- Burial place: Yateley, Hampshire
- Military career
- Allegiance: United Kingdom; Canada
- Branch: British Army; Canadian Militia
- Service years: 1845–1890
- Rank: Lieutenant-General
- Commands: Royal Military College, Sandhurst; General Officer Commanding the Canadian Militia
- Conflicts: New Zealand Wars; Indian Mutiny; North-West Rebellion
- Awards: Knight Commander of the Order of St Michael and St George; Companion of the Order of the Bath

Lieutenant-General Sir Frederick Dobson Middleton (4 November 1825 – 25 January 1898) was a British general noted for his service throughout the Empire and particularly in the North-West Rebellion in Canada.

== Imperial military career ==
Middleton was born in London, the third son of Major General Charles Middleton and Fanny Wheatley. Educated at Maidstone Grammar School and the Royal Military College, Sandhurst, Middleton was commissioned into the 58th Regiment of Foot in 1842.

He served in the New Zealand Wars, and in 1845 he was mentioned in dispatches for his part in the capture of the stronghold of Māori chief Te Ruki Kawiti.

In 1848 he transferred to the 96th Regiment of Foot in India and took part in the suppression of the Indian Mutiny in which campaign he was recommended for, but not awarded, the Victoria Cross. He went on to be Commandant of the Royal Military College, Sandhurst, in 1879.

== Canadian military career ==
He was appointed General Officer Commanding the Militia of Canada in 1884. He commanded the main counter-insurgency force when in 1885 a group of Métis launched the North-West Rebellion. His force was victorious in the Battle of Batoche, which ended the rebellion.

Middleton happened to be on the Prairies when the rebellion broke out. He had travelled from Ottawa to Winnipeg to evaluate Military District 10, which covered the Prairies, as the officer in charge of District 10 had just been dismissed on the account of his alcoholism. This was the same day as the Battle of Duck Lake, the first fighting in the Rebellion. Métis fighters defeated a force of the North-West Mounted Police there.

Though Middleton was elderly and generally cautious, his response to the news of Duck Lake was swift. That same day, he departed Winnipeg on a train bound for Qu'Appelle with a company of Manitoba militia.

The major difficulty for Middleton was mobilizing the militia forces of Ontario and Quebec. They had to travel on the only-partially-completed Canadian Pacific Railway. This required the men to march through snow and the rocks of northern Ontario to reach Winnipeg, the headquarters of the government forces.

Canadian historian Desmond Morton described Middleton as an experienced soldier who "mixed common sense and pomposity in equal measure". His plan was to take Batoche, the capital of the Métis exovedate (council) and thus end the rebellion. As the rebellion had shaken international confidence in the credit-worthiness of Canada, Middleton was under pressure from Prime Minister Sir John A. Macdonald, to end the rebellion as soon as possible.

The militiamen arriving in Winnipeg were mostly untrained, and Middleton worked to train them as they marched toward Batoche.

On 6 April 1885, Middleton and his troops set off from Qu'Appelle to march to Batoche. On 23 April, Métis and Cree fighters under Gabriel Dumont ambushed the troops at Fish Creek, temporarily stopping the advance.

Despite Middeton's orders, Colonel William Dillon Otter after reaching Battleford set out to do battle with the Cree, and was defeated by Chief Poundmaker at the Battle of Cut Knife Hill; only the latter's unwillingness to have his warriors take advantage of the rout saved the troops from being annihilated. Middleton planned to advance on Batoche with river steamers owned by the Hudson's Bay Company bringing up supplies along Swift Current Creek, Red Deer River and South Saskatchewan River, As steamers were not available at first, Middleton chose to wait. Despite their own panic at Fish Creek, many of the militiamen came to curse "Old Fred" as too timid, but Middleton had sound reasons for not wishing to advance without a means of resupply. Middleton knew that the Métis and the Cree were expert horsemen and believed they would ambush any supply wagons, which is why he preferred to bring up supplies and reinforcements via the river.

On 23 April, the steamer Northcote left from Swift Current, arriving at Fish Creek on 5 May, after the battle. With his resupply in place, on 5 May Middleton set off for Batoche., with the steamboat following on the river. On 9 May, the Northcote was stopped by a cable that Dumont had laid across the river outside of Batoche, and its U.S. captain turned back when the boat came under fire. The Northcote acted as a diversion to draw out the Métis, and at the same time, the Middleton's column arrived at Batoche. Seeing his troops beginning to panic again, Middleton ordered his wagons to be drawn into a circle to form a strong defensive position. On 11 May, Middleton observed that the outnumbered Métis and Cree had to rush from position to position in defence of Batoche, and on the morning of 12 May, Middleton ordered his artillery to open fire on his opponents to pin them down while his infantry advanced. Nothing had happened as infantry claimed not to hear the fire of the artillery; after accusing his men of cowardice, Middleton attacked again in the afternoon and with a battalion, commanded by Conservative MP Colonel Arthur Williams, leading the attack. Inspired by the example of Williams's battalion, other battalions charged forward. Shouting enthusiastically, the troops raced down from the hill, and the disheartened Métis and Cree fighters were either killed or fleeing.

Morton described Middleton as cautious, but a highly professional officer who was a better tactician than Dumont. He had brought the war to a swift conclusion in a manner that was much less bloody than it could have been. For his service in the war, Middleton was knighted by Queen Victoria in 1885. He also received the thanks of the Parliament of Canada and the sum of $20,000.

He resigned as head of the militia in 1890 when a select committee report of the House of Commons criticized him for the misappropriation of furs from a Scotch-Indian Charles Bremner and his Cree wife Emily Bremner, during the rebellion. There were also other criticisms of Middleton's command during the rebellion, such as his hesitancy to unleash the Canadian Militia troops to assault the Métis positions at Batoche, and unfair treatment and poor maintenance accorded the troops under his command. Returning to England, he was made Master of the Jewel Office.

== Family ==
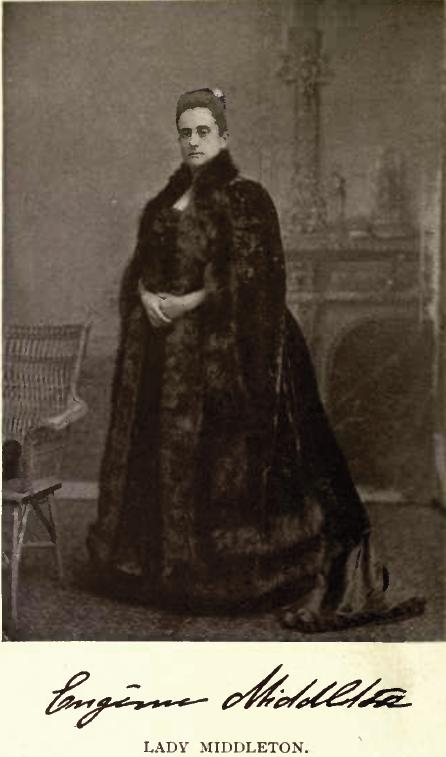
Lady Marie Cecile Eugenie Middleton

Frederick Dobson Middleton married, as his first wife, Mary Emily Hassall.

He married in February 1870 as his second wife, Marie Cecile Eugénie Doucet, daughter of Theodore Doucet, N.P., of Montreal. She was born in Montreal in 1846, and was educated at the Convent of the Sacred Heart, Sault-au-Récollet. The couple had two sons and a daughter. She died at Yateley, Hampshire, England, 1 November 1899.

== Bibliography ==
- Morton, Desmond (1999). A Military History of Canada. McClelland & Stewart. ISBN 978-0-7710-6514-9.

Military offices
Preceded by Richard Luard	General Officer Commanding the Militia of Canada; 1884–1890	Succeeded by Lord Treowen
