= One Arrow 95-1A =

Indian reserve in Saskatchewan, Canada

Coordinates: 52°40′22″N 106°06′44″W

- Indian reserve
- One Arrow Indian Reserve No. 95-1A
- Location in Saskatchewan
- First Nation: One Arrow
- Country: Canada
- Province: Saskatchewan

Area
  - Total: 109 ha (270 acres)

Population (2016)
  - Total: 10
  - Density: 9.2/km^{2} (24/sq mi)

One Arrow 95-1A is an Indian reserve of the One Arrow First Nation in Saskatchewan. It is about 27 kilometres (17 mi) north-east of Hague. In the 2016 Canadian Census, it recorded a population of 10 living in 2 of its 2 total private dwellings.

== See also ==
- List of Indian reserves in Saskatchewan
