= Fish Creek (Saskatchewan) =

River in Saskatchewan, Canada

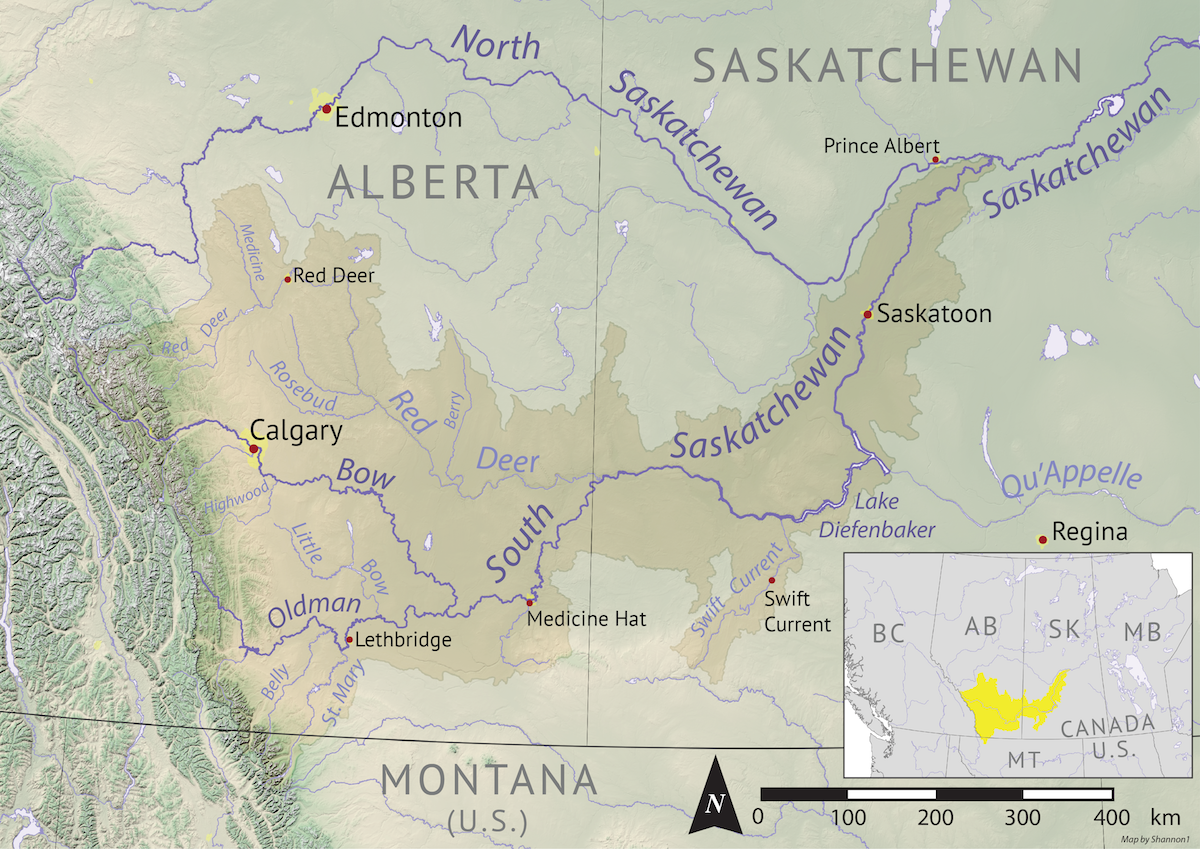
- The South Saskatchewan River drainage basin

- Location of the mouth in Saskatchewan Fish Creek (Saskatchewan) (Canada)

Location
- Country: Canada
- Province: Saskatchewan

Physical characteristics
- Source
  - location: RM of Aberdeen No. 373
  - coordinates: 52.3228°N 106.2661°W
- Mouth: South Saskatchewan River
  - location: RM of Fish Creek No. 402
  - coordinates: 52.5552°N 106.1756°W

Basin features
- River system: Saskatchewan River drainage basin

Fish Creek is a tributary of the South Saskatchewan River in the Canadian province of Saskatchewan, north-east of Saskatoon. From its source near Aberdeen it flows north-east until it turns north to enter the South Saskatchewan River.

It is notable as the site of the Battle of Tourond's Coulee/Fish Creek during the North-West Rebellion of 1885 between General Frederick Middleton of the Canadian Militia and Gabriel Dumont, adjutant general of the Metis Provisional Government of Saskatchewan. The area is part of the aspen parkland biome.

Fish Creek was the southern border of the Southbranch Settlement of French Métis who settled in the Saskatchewan Valley region in the mid to late 19th century. They knew it as Tourond's Coulee (French: Coulée des Tourond). Dumont chose to fight the battle at this natural border region as a defensive action with his outnumbered forces as the Canadian troops drove north. Dumont had less than sixty Métis, and this small force held off the Canadian troops for a day. The fighting took place on April 24, 1885.

The battle proved to be a success for the Métis forces in that they bloodied Middleton's nose and stalled the Canadian advance on Batoche, Saskatchewan; capital of Louis Riel's provisional government, for another two weeks.

Fish Creek also gives its name to a Saskatchewan Rural Municipality of Fish Creek No. 402 which encompasses the area today.

== See also ==
- List of rivers of Saskatchewan
