= Battle of Fish Creek =

1885 battle of the North-West Rebellion in Canada

Battle of Fish Creek Bataille de la Coulée des Tourond (French)
- Part of the North-West Rebellion
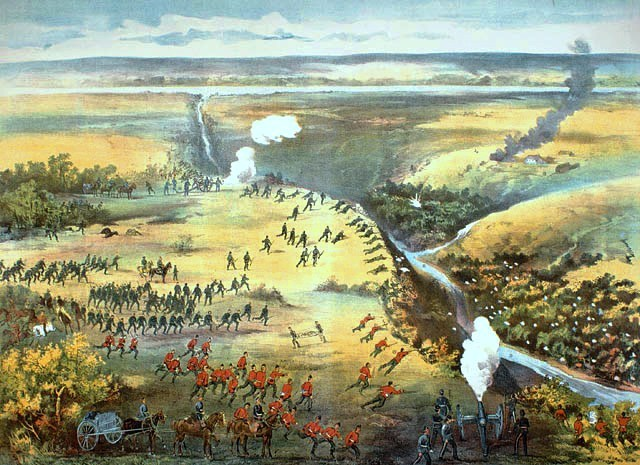
- Contemporary lithograph of the Battle of Fish Creek
Date	24 April 1885
Location	52°32′22.97″N 106°9′21.47″W; Fish Creek, Saskatchewan
Result	Metis victory; government advance temporarily halted.

Belligerents
Metis, Cree, Teton Sioux rebels	Canada

Commanders and leaders
Gabriel Dumont	Frederick Middleton

Strength
280	900

Casualties and losses
11 Métis & Dakota dead 18 wounded	11 dead 40 wounded

National Historic Site of Canada
- Official name: Battle of Tourond's Coulee / Fish Creek National Historic Site of Canada
- Designated: 1923

The District of Saskatchewan in 1885 (within the black diamonds) included the central section of Saskatchewan and extended into Alberta and Manitoba.
The Métis conflict area is circled in black.

The Battle of Fish Creek (also known as the Battle of Tourond's Coulée), fought April 24, 1885 at Fish Creek, Saskatchewan, was a major Métis victory over the Canadian forces attempting to quell Louis Riel's North-West Rebellion. Although the reversal was not decisive enough to alter the ultimate outcome of the conflict, it was convincing enough to persuade Major General Frederick Middleton to temporarily halt his advance on Batoche, where the Métis would later make their final stand.

== Battle ==
Middleton, having led his Field Force out from Qu'Appelle on April 10, was advancing upstream from Clarke's Crossing along the South Saskatchewan River when scouts discovered an apparent ambush by Gabriel Dumont's Métis / Dakota force at Fish Creek, about 17 kilometres (11 mi) south of Batoche. Fish Creek was Métis land.

Upon learning that Middleton was marching toward Batoche, Dumont suggested to Riel the use of guerrilla warfare, by blowing up train tracks to slow their progress. Riel countered that guerrilla tactics were "too much like Indian warfare". Dumont also proposed to attack them by surprise at night, but after he learned that Middleton's scouts were already on the lookout, he had to scrap the idea.

On April 23, as the militia began advancing from Clarke's Crossing, 90 kilometres (56 mi) south of Batoche, Dumont took 200 men and rode out from Batoche toward Tourond's Coulée. Louis Riel accompanied them. When a (false) report arrived that the North-West Mounted Police were advancing on Batoche, Riel returned there with 50 men. Dumont stationed most of his men in the coulée, where they set to work digging rifle pits. Meanwhile, Middleton had arrived at a point about 10 kilometres (6.2 mi) south of Fish Creek, and set up camp. Dumont took a party of twenty horsemen forward of the coulée. Their task was to seal the exit when the ambush was sprung, like a buffalo pound. However, an inexperienced Métis soldier had forgotten Dumont's specific demand to stay away from the road as it could give the location of the Métis away. The next day, the militia were about to attempt to cross the coulée. A scout spotted the tracks of the inexperienced Métis soldier and began to follow them. The scout was coming close to Dumont and his men, and Dumont stealthily attempted to catch him. Before Dumont could catch the scout, the Métis and Canadian Militia had come into contact with each other, and it was then that the concealed Métis in the rifle pits attempted to ambush the militia. Dumont, under pressure, shot the militia's scout and returned to his men in the poplar bluff rifle pits to fight the rest of the Canadian militia.

The Métis pounded Middleton's men with one devastating fusillade before withdrawing into cover and restricting themselves to sniper fire in order to conserve ammunition. Their position was strategically selected and enabled a simple and effective strategy of defence.

Since the Métis were positioned in the coulée, they were restricted to shooting up towards the Canadian Militia, and many of the wounds were mainly in the upper body and head area.

With half of his force on the opposite side of the river, Middleton was unable to bring his full numbers to bear. One of his artillery batteries opened fire on the Métis to little effect, although well-fired cannonades did succeed in driving away Dumont's Cree allies before their weight could be added to the battle.

Many of Dumont's men were fleeing the battle. Dumont stopped as many men as he could from leaving and convinced them to keep fighting. Dumont's numbers were decreasing vastly, as he had 47 of the 130 men that he began fighting with. Dumont very outnumbered, but was able to keep the Métis casualties to a minimum.

Strung out along the coulée's edge, silhouetted against the sky, the militia fired a vast amount of ammunition at the resistance, succeeding mostly in showering tree branches across the ravine, but when the artillerymen pushed their guns to the coulée's edge to try to fire down at the concealed Métis, they suffered heavy casualties. The only targets the militia could clearly see were the Métis' tethered horses: they killed about 55 of them.

General Middleton attempted to place himself in full view of the resistance. However, a bullet tore through his fur hat, and his two aides-de-camp were both wounded by his side. The frustrated Canadians, their casualties mounting, undertook several fruitless rushes into the ravine. A few infantry regulars under Middleton's command made one charge. Another, larger one was carried out by the 90th "Winnipeg" Battalion of Rifles. This latter advance was parried by the Métis' use of improvised barricades within the coulée. These uncoordinated advances accomplished nothing but more Canadian casualties. Middleton in a statement later on said: "[Métis] plans were well arranged beforehand and had my scouts not been well to the front we should have been attacked in the ravine and probably wiped out".

With night coming on, Middleton, distressed by the casualties he was taking, opted for retreat. At the battle's end, both sides had withdrawn from the battlefield but the Métis had inflicted greater casualties and had delayed Middleton's march on the Métis' headquarters at Batoche. Weeks later, after news reached him of the Cree victory over Colonel William Dillon Otter – to whom had been issued a Gatling gun – at Cut Knife, Middleton arrived at Batoche.

== Maps ==
- Military Battlefield Map of Fish Creek
- Military Map of Fish Creek view 1
- Military Map of Fish Creek view 2
- Military Map of Fish Creek Rifle Pits

== Legacy ==
North West Rebellion - Fish Creek - While General Middleton was moving to capture Batoche his forces were attacked on the 24th April, 1885, by the Half-breeds under Gabriel Dumont from concealed rifle pits near the mouth of Fish Creek. The rebels were defeated and driven from the field. Erected 1933.

— National Historic Sites and Monuments Board

The site of the battle was designated a National Historic Site of Canada in 1923.

In the spring of 2008, Tourism, Parks, Culture and Sport Minister Christine Tell proclaimed in Duck Lake, that "the 125th commemoration, in 2010, of the 1885 Northwest Resistance is an excellent opportunity to tell the story of the prairie Métis and First Nations peoples' struggle with Government forces and how it has shaped Canada today."

The Battle of Fish Creek National Historic Site, now named Tourond's Coulée / Fish Creek National Historic Site, preserves the battlefield of April 24, 1885 at la coulée des Tourond , and the story of Madame Tourond's home. The National Historic site of Middleton's camp and graveyard is across the Fish Creek water body and is north west of the theatre of battle which occurred in the creek valley west of the Tourond farmhouse site.

== See also ==
- List of battles won by indigenous peoples of the Americas
