= St. Isidore-de-Bellevue, Saskatchewan =

St. Isidore-de-Bellevue
- Organized Hamlet
- Location within Saskatchewan
- Coordinates: 52°47′2″N 105°55′8″W
- Country: Canada
- Province: Saskatchewan
- Rural Municipality: St. Louis No. 431
- Post office Founded as Garonne, Saskatchewan NWT: 1897-10-01
- Post office Founded as St. Isidore de Bellevue: 1927-08-01

Area
  - Total: 0.19 km^{2} (0.073 sq mi)

Population (2011)
  - Total: 111
  - Density: 578.7/km^{2} (1,499/sq mi)
- Time zone: UTC-6 (CST)

St. Isidore-de-Bellevue is a francophone Métis community in Saskatchewan, Canada, northeast of Saskatoon in the rural municipality of St. Louis No. 431, Saskatchewan.

The hamlet was named Bellevue because of the beautiful view from atop Minnitinas Hill. Today the hamlet consists of a garage, school, church, restaurant, pea cleaning/splitting plant, post office, insurance broker, francophone school, bank, old age home, archive facility, cultural centre and more.

== Demographics ==
In the 2021 Census of Population conducted by Statistics Canada, St. Isidore-de-Bellevue had a population of 154 living in 50 of its 51 total private dwellings, a change of 1.3% from its 2016 population of 152. With a land area of 0.22 km^{2} (0.085 sq mi), it had a population density of 700.0/km^{2} (1,813.0/sq mi) in 2021.
