= Batoche =

National historic site in Saskatchewan, Canada

- National Historic Site
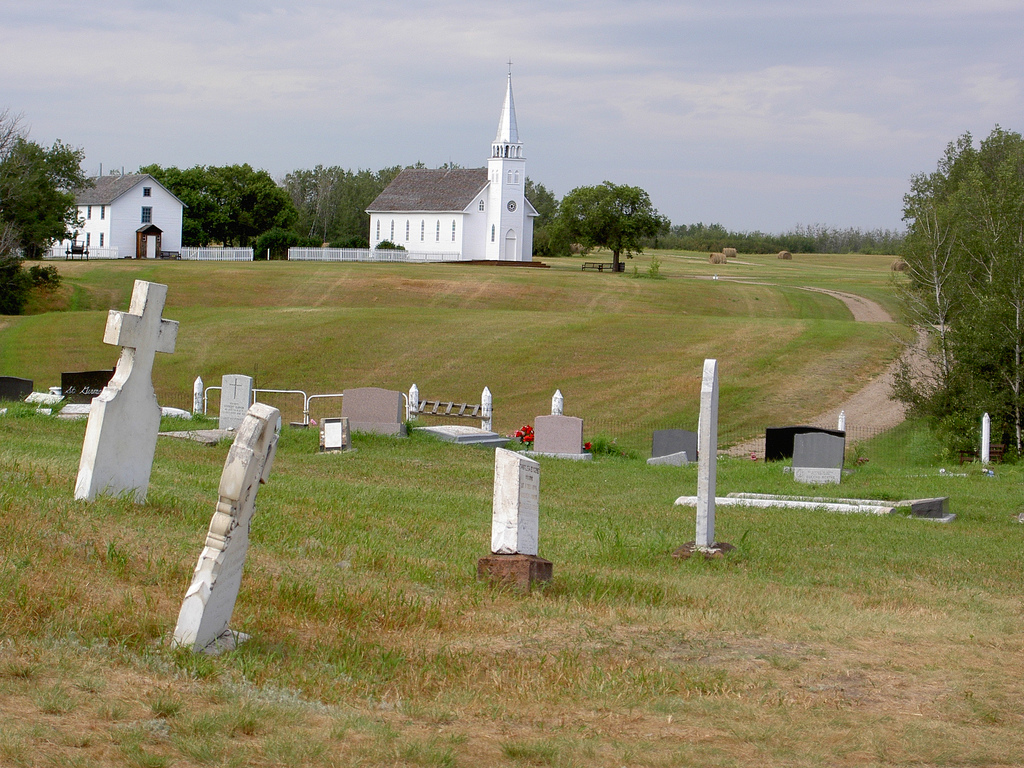
- Church, rectory and cemetery of Saint Antoine de Padoue in Batoche

- Location within Saskatchewan Location within Canada
- Coordinates: 52.755°N 106.116°W
- Country: Canada
- Province: Saskatchewan
- Region: Southcentral Saskatchewan
- Census division: 15
- Rural Municipality: St. Louis No. 431
- Established: 1872
- Incorporated (village): 1885
- Designation (National Historic Site): 1923

Government
  - administrator: Louise Hodgson
  - Governing body: St. Louis No. 431
- Time zone: CST
- Postal code: S0J 1E0
- Area code: 306
- Highways: Highway 225
- Waterways: South Saskatchewan River

National Historic Site of Canada
- Official name: Batoche National Historic Site of Canada
- Designated: 1923

Batoche, which lies between Prince Albert and Saskatoon in the Canadian province of Saskatchewan, was the site of the historic Battle of Batoche during the North-West Rebellion of 1885. The battle resulted in the defeat of Louis Riel and his Métis forces by Major General Frederick Middleton and his Northwest Field Force. Batoche was then a small village of some 500 residents. The site has since become depopulated and now has few residents. The 1885 church building and a few other historic buildings have been preserved, and the site is a National Historic Site.

== History ==
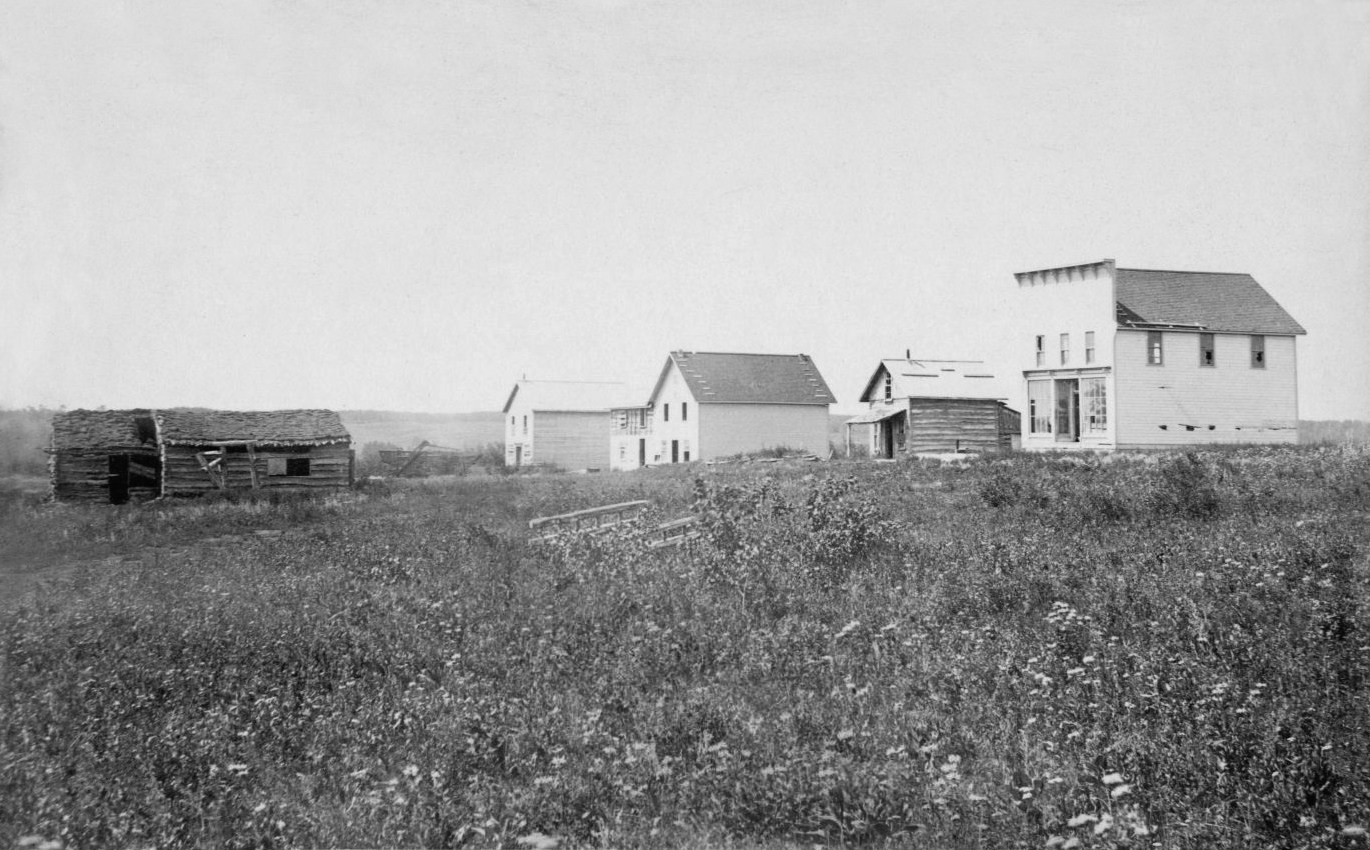
Batoche in 1885

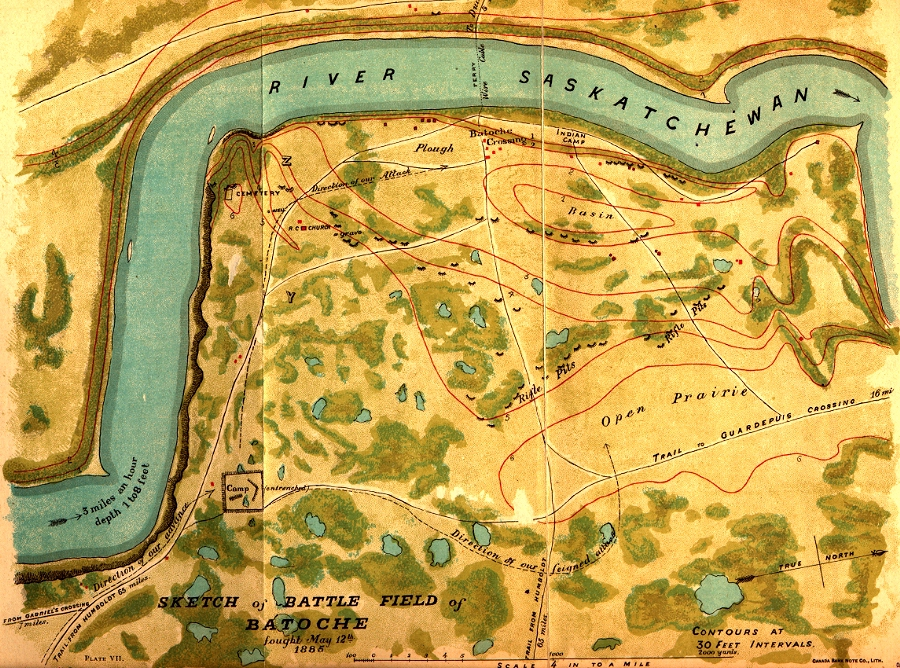
Batoche battlefield map 1885

The Métis settlement of Batoche (named after Xavier Letendre dit Batoche) was established in 1872. By 1885 it numbered 500 people. The Métis of the area settled on river lots, and the community contained several stores as well as the Roman Catholic Church of St. Antoine de Padoue at the time of the Rebellion. Batoche was the de facto capital of Riel's Provisional Government of Saskatchewan.

Batoche is a Southbranch Settlement. It is situated mainly along the east bank of the South Saskatchewan River between St. Laurent and Fish Creek. This area is part of the aspen parkland biome.

This community consisted mostly of Francophones and Roman Catholics.

== Batoche National Historic Site ==
Batoche was declared a National Historic Site in 1923. The visitor centre features a multimedia presentation about the history of the community and its inhabitants. There are several restored buildings with costumed interpreters who depict the lifestyles of the Métis of Batoche between 1860 and 1900. The sites include a North-West Mounted Police encampment, a church and rectory complex, and a farm home. The sites are set at different locations around the community. The complex is open from mid-May through mid-September.

== In popular culture ==
- In 1989, Ralph D. Witten's short story "Batoche" was read on CBC Radio by Wendell Smith

== See also ==
- List of communities in Saskatchewan
- Bell of Batoche
- Gabriel Dumont
