= Division No. 16, Saskatchewan =

Census division in Canada

Coordinates: 52°27′42″N 107°23′35″W

Division No. 16
- Census division in Saskatchewan
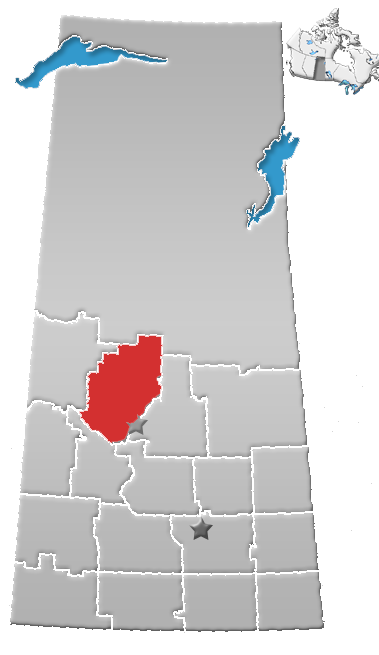
- Country: Canada
- Province: Saskatchewan

Area
  - Total: 21,828.49 km^{2} (8,428.03 sq mi)
- As of 2016

Population (2016)
  - Total: 37,999
  - Density: 1.7408/km^{2} (4.5086/sq mi)

Division No. 16 is one of eighteen census divisions in the province of Saskatchewan, Canada, as defined by Statistics Canada. It is located in the north-central part of the province. The most populous community in this division is North Battleford.

== Demographics ==
In the 2021 Census of Population conducted by Statistics Canada, Division No. 16 had a population of 37,993 living in 14,886 of its 19,000 total private dwellings, a change of −0% from its 2016 population of 37,999. With a land area of 21,607.42 km^{2} (8,342.67 sq mi), it had a population density of 1.8/km^{2} (4.6/sq mi) in 2021.

== Census subdivisions ==
The following census subdivisions (municipalities or municipal equivalents) are located within Saskatchewan's Division No. 16.

=== Cities ===
- North Battleford

=== Towns ===
- Big River
- Blaine Lake
- Hafford
- Radisson
- Shellbrook
- Spiritwood

=== Villages ===
- Borden
- Canwood
- Debden
- Denholm
- Krydor
- Leask
- Leoville
- Marcelin
- Maymont
- Medstead
- Parkside
- Richard
- Ruddell
- Shell Lake
- Speers

=== Resort villages ===
- Big Shell
- Echo Bay
- Pebble Baye

=== Rural municipalities ===
- RM No. 405 Great Bend
- RM No. 406 Mayfield
- RM No. 434 Blaine Lake
- RM No. 435 Redberry
- RM No. 436 Douglas
- RM No. 437 North Battleford
- RM No. 464 Leask
- RM No. 466 Meeting Lake
- RM No. 467 Round Hill
- RM No. 493 Shellbrook
- RM No. 494 Canwood
- RM No. 496 Spiritwood
- RM No. 497 Medstead
- RM No. 555 Big River

=== Crown colonies ===
- North Battleford Crown Colony

=== Unorganized areas ===
- Prince Albert National Park

=== Indian reserves ===
- Ahtahkakoop 104
- Big River 118
- Chitek Lake 191
- Little Red River 106D
- Lucky Man Reserve
- Mistawasis 103
- Muskeg Lake 102B
- Muskeg Lake 102D
- Muskeg Lake 102E
- Muskeg Lake 102F
- Muskeg Lake 102G
- Muskeg Lake 102
- Pelican Lake 191A
- Pelican Lake 191B
- Saulteaux 159A
- Sturgeon Lake 101
- Sweetgrass 113-L6
- Witchekan Lake 117
- Witchekan Lake 117D

== See also ==
- List of census divisions of Saskatchewan
- List of communities in Saskatchewan
