= Mönchengladbach (electoral district) =

Federal electoral district of Germany

108 Mönchengladbach
- Electoral district for the Bundestag
- Mönchengladbach in 2025
- State: North Rhine-Westphalia
- Population: 261,000 (2019)
- Electorate: 185,185 (2021)
- Major settlements: Mönchengladbach
- Area: 170.5 km^{2}

Current electoral district
- Created: 1949
- Party: CDU
- Member: Günter Krings
- Elected: 2002, 2005, 2009, 2013, 2017, 2021, 2025

Mönchengladbach is an electoral constituency (German: Wahlkreis) represented in the Bundestag. It elects one member via first-past-the-post voting. Under the current constituency numbering system, it is designated as constituency 108. It is located in western North Rhine-Westphalia, comprising the city of Mönchengladbach.

Mönchengladbach was created for the inaugural 1949 federal election. Since 2002, it has been represented by Günter Krings of the Christian Democratic Union (CDU).

== Geography ==
Mönchengladbach is located in western North Rhine-Westphalia. As of the 2021 federal election, it is coterminous with the independent city of Mönchengladbach.

== History ==
Mönchengladbach was created in 1949, then known as Rheydt – M.Gladbach – Viersen. It acquired its current name in the 1965 election. In the 1949 election, it was North Rhine-Westphalia constituency 23 in the numbering system. From 1953 through 1961, it was number 82. From 1965 through 1976, it was number 79. From 1980 through 1998, it was number 78. From 2002 through 2009, it was number 110. In the 2013 through 2021 elections, it was number 109. From the 2025 election, it has been number 108.

Originally, the constituency comprised the independent cities of Rheydt, Mönchengladbach, and Viersen. From 1965 through 1976, it comprised the independent cities of Mönchengladbach and Viersen. It acquired its current borders in the 1980 election.

Election	No.	Name	Borders
1949	23	Rheydt – M.Gladbach – Viersen	Rheydt city; Mönchengladbach city; Viersen city
1953	82	Rheydt – M.Gladbach – Viersen	Rheydt city; Mönchengladbach city; Viersen city
1957	82	Rheydt – M.Gladbach – Viersen	Rheydt city; Mönchengladbach city; Viersen city
1961	82	Rheydt – M.Gladbach – Viersen	Rheydt city; Mönchengladbach city; Viersen city
1965	79	Mönchengladbach	Mönchengladbach city; Viersen city
1969	79	Mönchengladbach	Mönchengladbach city; Viersen city
1972	79	Mönchengladbach	Mönchengladbach city; Viersen city
1976	79	Mönchengladbach	Mönchengladbach city; Viersen city
1980	78	Mönchengladbach	Mönchengladbach city
1983	78	Mönchengladbach	Mönchengladbach city
1987	78	Mönchengladbach	Mönchengladbach city
1990	78	Mönchengladbach	Mönchengladbach city
1994	78	Mönchengladbach	Mönchengladbach city
1998	78	Mönchengladbach	Mönchengladbach city
2002	110	Mönchengladbach	Mönchengladbach city
2005	110	Mönchengladbach	Mönchengladbach city
2009	110	Mönchengladbach	Mönchengladbach city
2013	109	Mönchengladbach	Mönchengladbach city
2017	109	Mönchengladbach	Mönchengladbach city
2021	109	Mönchengladbach	Mönchengladbach city
2025	108	Mönchengladbach	Mönchengladbach city

== Members ==
The constituency has been held by the Christian Democratic Union (CDU) during all but one Bundestag term since 1949. It was first represented by Hans Schmitz from 1949 to 1953, followed by Joseph Illerhaus from 1951 to 1969. Curt Becker served from 1969 to 1976, Wolfgang Feinendegen from 1976 to 1983, and Hans-Wilhelm Pesch from 1983 to 1998. Hildegard Wester of the Social Democratic Party (SPD) won the constituency in 1998 and served a single term. Günter Krings regained it for the CDU in 2002 and was re-elected in 2005, 2009, 2013, 2017, 2021, and 2025.

Election	Member	Party	%
1949	Hans Schmitz	CDU	37.4
1953	Joseph Illerhaus	CDU	66.4
1957	Joseph Illerhaus	CDU	65.6
1961	Joseph Illerhaus	CDU	56.7
1965	Joseph Illerhaus	CDU	57.9
1969	Curt Becker	CDU	55.5
1972	Curt Becker	CDU	51.1
1976	Wolfgang Feinendegen	CDU	54.3
1980	Wolfgang Feinendegen	CDU	48.6
1983	Hans-Wilhelm Pesch	CDU	54.5
1987	Hans-Wilhelm Pesch	CDU	49.5
1990	Hans-Wilhelm Pesch	CDU	46.9
1994	Hans-Wilhelm Pesch	CDU	45.1
1998	Hildegard Wester	SPD	47.7
2002	Günter Krings	CDU	43.6
2005	Günter Krings	CDU	47.9
2009	Günter Krings	CDU	45.6
2013	Günter Krings	CDU	50.8
2017	Günter Krings	CDU	44.3
2021	Günter Krings	CDU	35.6
2025	Günter Krings	CDU	36.4

== Election results ==
=== 2025 election ===
Federal election (2025): Mönchengladbach
Notes:	Blue background denotes the winner of the electorate vote. Pink background denotes a candidate elected from their party list. Yellow background denotes an electorate win by a list member, or other incumbent. A ✓ or ✗ denotes status of any incumbent, win or lose respectively.						
Party	Candidate	Votes	%	±%	Party votes	%	±%
CDU	✓ Günter Krings	50,331	36.4	▲0.8	42,525	30.6	▲2.1
SPD	Gülistan Yüksel	36,259	26.2	▼3.2	26,041	18.7	▼8.4
AfD	Michael Immel	25,280	18.3	▲10.5	25,125	18.1	▲10.6
Greens	Kathrin Henneberger	13,648	9.9	▼3.7	13,844	10.1	▼4.2
Left					13,206	9.5	▲5.7
BSW					6,399	4.6	
FDP	Dirk Hansen	4,555	3.3	▼5.3	6,324	4.5	▼7.5
PARTEI	Ulas Zabci	3,453	2.5	▲0.1	860	0.6	▼0.6
Volt	Martina Nolte	2,167	1.6		851	0.6	▲0.4
Tierschutzpartei					2,016	1.4	▼0.1
FW	Stephan Wilms	1,478	1.1	0.0	657	0.5	▼0.2
BD	Corina Bülow	917	0.7		270	0.2	
Values	Dominique Fietze	359	0.3		145	0.1	
dieBasis				▼1.4	313	0.2	▼0.8
Team Todenhöfer					228	0.2	▼0.5
PdF					205	0.1	▲0.1
MERA25					75	0.1	
MLPD					32	0.0	0.0
Pirates							▼0.4
Gesundheitsforschung							▼0.1
ÖDP							▼0.1
Humanists							▼0.1
Bündnis C							0.0
SGP						0.0	0.0
Informal votes		1,616			947		
Total valid votes		138,447			139,116		
Turnout		140,063	77.3	▲7.3			
CDU hold	Majority	14,071	10.2				

=== 2021 election ===
Federal election (2021): Mönchengladbach
Notes:	Blue background denotes the winner of the electorate vote. Pink background denotes a candidate elected from their party list. Yellow background denotes an electorate win by a list member, or other incumbent. A ✓ or ✗ denotes status of any incumbent, win or lose respectively.						
Party	Candidate	Votes	%	±%	Party votes	%	±%
CDU	✓ Günter Krings	45,550	35.6	▼8.7	36,555	28.5	▼7.3
SPD	Gülistan Yüksel	37,548	29.3	▲5.0	34,877	27.2	▲3.8
Greens	Kathrin Henneberger	17,302	13.5	▲7.5	18,166	14.1	▲7.9
FDP	Peter König	10,957	8.6	▲0.7	15,459	12.0	▼1.7
AfD	Peter Müller	9,915	7.7	▼1.4	9,641	7.5	▼1.9
Left					4,927	3.8	▼3.5
Tierschutzpartei					2,013	1.6	▲0.7
PARTEI	Maximilian Bergmann	3,105	2.4	▲0.9	1,562	1.2	▲0.2
dieBasis	Mona Aranea Guillén	1,821	1.4		1,343	1.0	
Team Todenhöfer					907	0.7	
FW	Annette Schrader-Schoutz	1,422	1.1		850	0.7	▲0.4
Pirates					467	0.4	▼0.1
Volt					310	0.2	
LIEBE					211	0.2	
NPD					190	0.1	▼0.1
Gesundheitsforschung					166	0.1	0.0
V-Partei3					122	0.1	▼0.1
LfK					119	0.1	
ÖDP					111	0.1	0.0
Humanists					109	0.1	0.0
DKP	Marcel Rommerskirchen	319	0.3		86	0.1	▼0.1
du.					74	0.1	
PdF					49	0.0	
Bündnis C					33	0.0	
MLPD					24	0.0	0.0
LKR					22	0.0	
SGP					12	0.0	0.0
Informal votes		1,707			1,241		
Total valid votes		127,939			128,405		
Turnout		129,646	70.0	▲0.7			
CDU hold	Majority	8,002	6.3	▼13.7			

=== 2017 election ===
Federal election (2017): Mönchengladbach
Notes:	Blue background denotes the winner of the electorate vote. Pink background denotes a candidate elected from their party list. Yellow background denotes an electorate win by a list member, or other incumbent. A ✓ or ✗ denotes status of any incumbent, win or lose respectively.						
Party	Candidate	Votes	%	±%	Party votes	%	±%
CDU	✓ Günter Krings	57,766	44.3	▼6.5	46,786	35.8	▼7.9
SPD	Gülistan Yüksel	31,766	24.4	▼4.8	30,547	23.3	▼4.8
AfD	Holger Heinz Hexgen	11,910	9.1	▲5.7	12,373	9.5	▲5.3
FDP	Stefan Dahlmanns	10,225	7.8	▲5.6	17,946	13.7	▲7.8
Left	Sebastian Merkens	8,921	6.8	▲0.6	9,627	7.4	▲0.9
Greens	Peter Walter	7,814	6.0	▼0.1	8,169	6.2	▲0.1
PARTEI	Sina Houben	1,956	1.5	▲0.8	1,280	1.0	▲0.4
Tierschutzpartei					1,100	0.8	
AD-DEMOKRATEN					613	0.5	
Pirates					582	0.4	▼2.1
NPD					350	0.3	▼0.8
FW					279	0.2	0.0
V-Partei³					243	0.2	
DiB					142	0.1	
BGE					130	0.1	
Volksabstimmung					126	0.1	▼0.1
Gesundheitsforschung					118	0.1	
DM					111	0.1	
ÖDP					110	0.1	0.0
Die Humanisten					91	0.1	
MLPD					85	0.1	0.0
Independent	Kai Michael Müller-Horn	85	0.1				
DKP					22	0.0	
SGP					6	0.0	0.0
Informal votes		1,563			1,170		
Total valid votes		130,443			130,836		
Turnout		132,006	69.3	▲3.1			
CDU hold	Majority	26,000	19.9	▼1.7			

=== 2013 election ===
Federal election (2013): Mönchengladbach
Notes:	Blue background denotes the winner of the electorate vote. Pink background denotes a candidate elected from their party list. Yellow background denotes an electorate win by a list member, or other incumbent. A ✓ or ✗ denotes status of any incumbent, win or lose respectively.						
Party	Candidate	Votes	%	±%	Party votes	%	±%
CDU	✓ Günter Krings	63,843	50.8	▲5.3	55,030	43.7	▲8.6
SPD	Gülistan Yüksel	36,665	29.2	▲1.5	35,447	28.1	▲3.7
Left	Bernhard Clasen	7,827	6.2	▼1.3	8,080	6.4	▼1.9
Greens	Gerhard Brenner	7,638	6.1	▼2.2	7,792	6.2	▼2.7
AfD	Hermann Behrendt	4,259	3.4		5,255	4.2	
FDP	Hans Joachim Stockschläger	2,847	2.3	▼7.2	7,414	5.9	▼12.2
Pirates					3,149	2.5	▲0.7
NPD	Manfred Frentzen	1,663	1.3	0.0	1,339	1.1	▲0.1
PARTEI	Ephraim Beckers	864	0.7		744	0.6	
FW					316	0.3	
PRO					310	0.2	
Volksabstimmung					199	0.2	▲0.1
Nichtwahler					179	0.1	
ÖDP					158	0.1	▲0.1
REP					145	0.1	▼0.1
BIG					124	0.1	
Party of Reason					123	0.1	
RRP					45	0.0	▼0.1
MLPD					30	0.0	0.0
PSG					23	0.0	0.0
BüSo					20	0.0	0.0
Die Rechte					20	0.0	
Informal votes		1,953			1,617		
Total valid votes		125,606			125,942		
Turnout		127,559	66.2	▲2.3			
CDU hold	Majority	27,178	21.6	▲3.7			

=== 2009 election ===
Federal election (2009): Mönchengladbach
Notes:	Blue background denotes the winner of the electorate vote. Pink background denotes a candidate elected from their party list. Yellow background denotes an electorate win by a list member, or other incumbent. A ✓ or ✗ denotes status of any incumbent, win or lose respectively.						
Party	Candidate	Votes	%	±%	Party votes	%	±%
CDU	✓ Günter Krings	55,784	45.6	▼2.3	43,020	35.0	▼4.0
SPD	Hermann-Josef Krichel-Mäurer	33,852	27.7	▼11.2	30,018	24.5	▼10.1
FDP	Hans Joachim Stockschläger	11,573	9.5	▲5.4	22,148	18.0	▲6.0
Greens	Gerd Brenner	10,162	8.3	▲4.5	10,876	8.9	▲2.6
Left	Bernhard Clasen	9,233	7.5	▲3.3	10,241	8.3	▲3.1
Pirates					2,191	1.8	
NPD	Manfred Frentzen	1,569	1.3	▲0.2	1,231	1.0	▲0.1
Tierschutzpartei					906	0.7	▲0.2
FAMILIE					526	0.4	0.0
RENTNER					526	0.4	
REP					301	0.2	0.0
Centre					259	0.2	0.0
Independent	Hans Günter Dennhoven	243	0.2				
RRP					196	0.2	
Volksabstimmung					104	0.1	0.0
ÖDP					84	0.1	
DVU					49	0.0	
MLPD					31	0.0	0.0
BüSo					20	0.0	0.0
PSG					19	0.0	0.0
Informal votes		1,774			1,444		
Total valid votes		122,416			122,746		
Turnout		124,190	63.9	▼8.6			
CDU hold	Majority	21,932	17.9	▲8.9			

=== 2005 election ===
Federal election (2005): Mönchengladbach
Notes:	Blue background denotes the winner of the electorate vote. Pink background denotes a candidate elected from their party list. Yellow background denotes an electorate win by a list member, or other incumbent. A ✓ or ✗ denotes status of any incumbent, win or lose respectively.						
Party	Candidate	Votes	%	±%	Party votes	%	±%
CDU	✓ Günter Krings	66,715	47.9	▲4.3	54,439	39.0	▼1.8
SPD	Hildegard Wester	54,170	38.9	▼3.5	48,167	34.5	▼3.5
Left	Bernhard Clason	5,870	4.2	▲3.3	7,337	5.3	▲4.1
FDP	Thomas Deicke	5,711	4.1	▼3.3	16,819	12.1	▲2.1
Greens	Peter Walter	5,308	3.8	▼1.1	8,715	6.2	▼1.5
NPD	Andreas Koroschetz	1,550	1.1		1,237	0.9	▲0.7
Tierschutzpartei					804	0.6	▲0.2
Familie					623	0.4	▲0.2
GRAUEN					602	0.4	▲0.2
REP					328	0.2	▼0.1
PBC					134	0.1	
From Now on... Democracy Through Referendum					115	0.1	
Socialist Equality Party					59	0.0	
Centre					56	0.0	
MLPD					40	0.0	
BüSo					24	0.0	
Informal votes		2,170			1,995		
Total valid votes		139,324			139,499		
Turnout		141,494	72.5	▼1.8			
CDU hold	Majority	12,545	9				
