= Peche =

Pêche is French for "fishing" or "peach".

Peche or Pêche may refer to:

== Places ==
- Peche Island, an uninhabited Canadian river island, located at the northern end of the Detroit River
- Peche River, a river located in Afghanistan
- La Pêche, Quebec, a municipality along both sides of the Gatineau River, Canada
- La Pêche Lake, a lake in western Quebec, Canada
- La Pêche River, a river in western Quebec which flows from La Pêche Lake (Lac La Pêche)
- Lac La Peche, a community in Saskatchewan, Canada
- Lac la Pêche, a lake in Saskatchewan

== People ==
- Matthieu Péché (born 1987), French slalom canoeist
- Robert Peche, a medieval Bishop of Coventry from 1121 to 1128
- Richard Peche, a medieval Bishop of Coventry, probably the son of Robert Peche
- John Peche, a Lord Warden of the Cinque Ports from 1323 to 1325
- Peche Di, a transgender model, dancer, actress, videographer, and modeling agent
- Therese Peche (1806–1882), German-born Austrian stage actress

== See also ==
- Pech (disambiguation)
