= Emerald Lake (Saskatchewan) =

Lake in Saskatchewan, Canada

- Ruxee Lake
- Location in Saskatchewan Emerald Lake (Canada)
- Location: RM of Leask No. 464, Saskatchewan
- Coordinates: 53.1834°N 106.9672°W
- Part of: Saskatchewan River drainage basin
- Primary inflows: Mistawasis Creek and natural springs
- River sources: Thickwood Hills
- Primary outflows: Mistawasis Creek
- Basin countries: Canada
- Surface area: 92.6 ha (229 acres)
- Max. depth: 14.03 m (46.0 ft)
- Shore length^{1}: 4.7 km (2.9 mi)
- Surface elevation: 549 m (1,801 ft)
- ^{1} Shore length is not a well-defined measure.

Emerald Lake is a lake in the Canadian province of Saskatchewan. It was originally named Ruxee Lake but was renamed 'Emerald Lake' for its clean, spring-fed water. The lake is in the Rural Municipality of Leask No. 464 in a forest of pine, aspen, birch, and hazelnut trees. The lake is fed from Mistawasis Creek and natural springs. Mistawasis Creek flows into the northern end of Emerald Lake from Iroquois Lake, which is about one mile upstream to the west. Mistawasis Creek flows out of the lake from the eastern shore and flows in an easterly direction and joins Shell River, which is a tributary of the Sturgeon River.

== Emerald Lake Regional Park ==
Emerald Lake Regional Park (53.1806°N 106.9631°W) is a 160-acre park on the southern shore of the lake. Founded in 1968, the park amenities include a campground, golf course, cabins, lake access, swimming lessons, and picnicking. The campground has 34 campsites plus 47 seasonal sites, potable water, showers, washrooms, and a concession.

In the 1920s, the RM of Leask leased the area around Emerald Lake for a park. In the following decade, the Avebury Community Club took over the lease. Two decades later, in the 1950s, the Leask Branch of the Royal Canadian Legion took over the lease from the Avebury Community Club. In 1968, the park became a regional park as the Legion transferred the lease to the Saskatchewan Regional Parks Association.

The golf course, which was in founded 1970, is a 9-hole, sand and artificial greens course. It is a par 34 with 2,900 total yards.

== Fish species ==
Fish commonly found in Emerald Lake include walleye and northern pike.

== See also ==
- List of lakes of Saskatchewan
- Tourism in Saskatchewan
- List of protected areas of Saskatchewan
