= Kelly Wolfe =

Kelly Wolfe may refer to:

- Kelly Warren Wolfe, an American professional wrestler who goes by the name Wolfie D
- Kelly Wolfe, the chief of the Muskeg Lake Cree Nation (appointed February 12, 2024, for a three-year term)
