= Mary Greyeyes =

Canadian Army servicewoman (1920–2011)

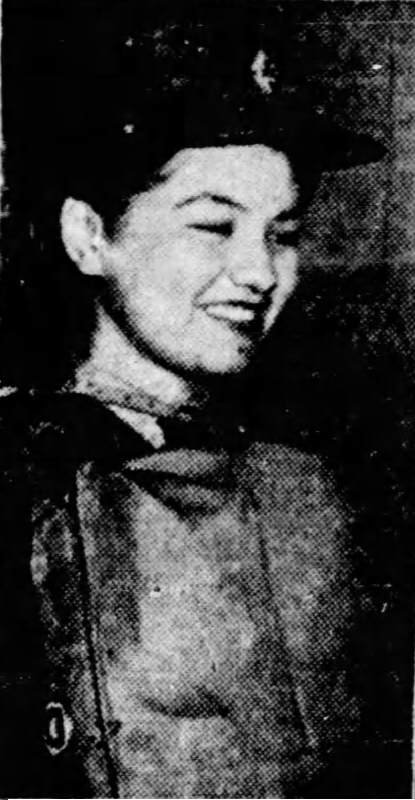
- Greyeyes in 1943
- Born: November 14, 1920; Muskeg Lake Cree Nation Reserve, Marcelin, Saskatchewan
- Died: March 31, 2011 (aged 90); Vancouver, British Columbia
- Spouse: Alexander Reid
- Children: Two
- Relatives: David Greyeyes Steele (brother)
- Military career
- Allegiance: Canada
- Branch: Canadian Women's Army Corps
- Service years: 1942–1946
- Rank: Private
- Service number: 6561
- Conflicts: Second World War

Mary Greyeyes Reid (November 14, 1920 – March 31, 2011) was a Canadian World War II servicewoman. A Cree from the Muskeg Lake Cree Nation in Saskatchewan, she was the first First Nations woman to enlist in the Canadian Armed Forces. After joining the Canadian Women's Army Corps (CWAC) in 1942, she became the subject of an internationally famous army publicity photograph, and was sent overseas to serve in London, England, where she was introduced to public figures such as George VI and his daughter Elizabeth. Greyeyes remained in London until being discharged in 1946, after which she returned to Canada.

== Early life ==
Mary Greyeyes was born November 14, 1920, in the Muskeg Lake Cree Nation reserve in Marcelin, Saskatchewan. She had ten siblings: six sisters and four brothers. She was raised by her widowed grandmother, Sarah Greyeyes.

When she was five years old, Greyeyes was sent to the St. Michael's residential school in Duck Lake, Saskatchewan. The school only taught students up to grade 8, but Greyeyes managed to obtain additional tutoring in later years from a nun at the school, attending evening lessons while helping with cooking and cleaning during the day. She was known for her eagerness for knowledge.

== Canadian forces ==
=== Enlistment ===
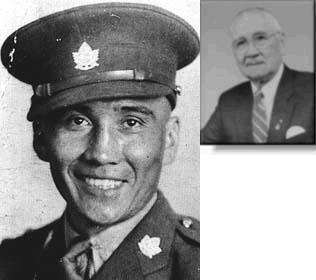
Greyeyes' brother, David. He was decorated for his wartime service, returned home to become Chief of the Muskeg Lake reserve, and later became the first Indigenous regional director for Indian Affairs.

The Muskeg Lake Cree Nation reserve had been heavily impacted by the Great Depression, and by the early 1940s there was little work for youth on the reserve. Greyeyes' favourite brother, David Greyeyes, left the reserve in search of work to help support the family, and in 1940, David enlisted in the Canadian Army. Greyeyes subsequently decided to do the same, seeing enlistment as a valuable chance to expand her own knowledge and experience.

In June 1942, Greyeyes travelled to Regina in order to take the test for enlistment. The Women's Royal Canadian Naval Service and the women's division of the Royal Canadian Air Force both required that new recruits be "a British subject, of white race", but recruitment for the Canadian Women's Army Corps (CWAC) was open to citizens of "any of the United Nations" and all races. Although Greyeyes worried that her grade 8 certification from the residential school would be inadequate, she passed the CWAC test and was accepted.

Upon completing the test, Greyeyes became the first First Nations woman to join the Canadian Armed Forces.

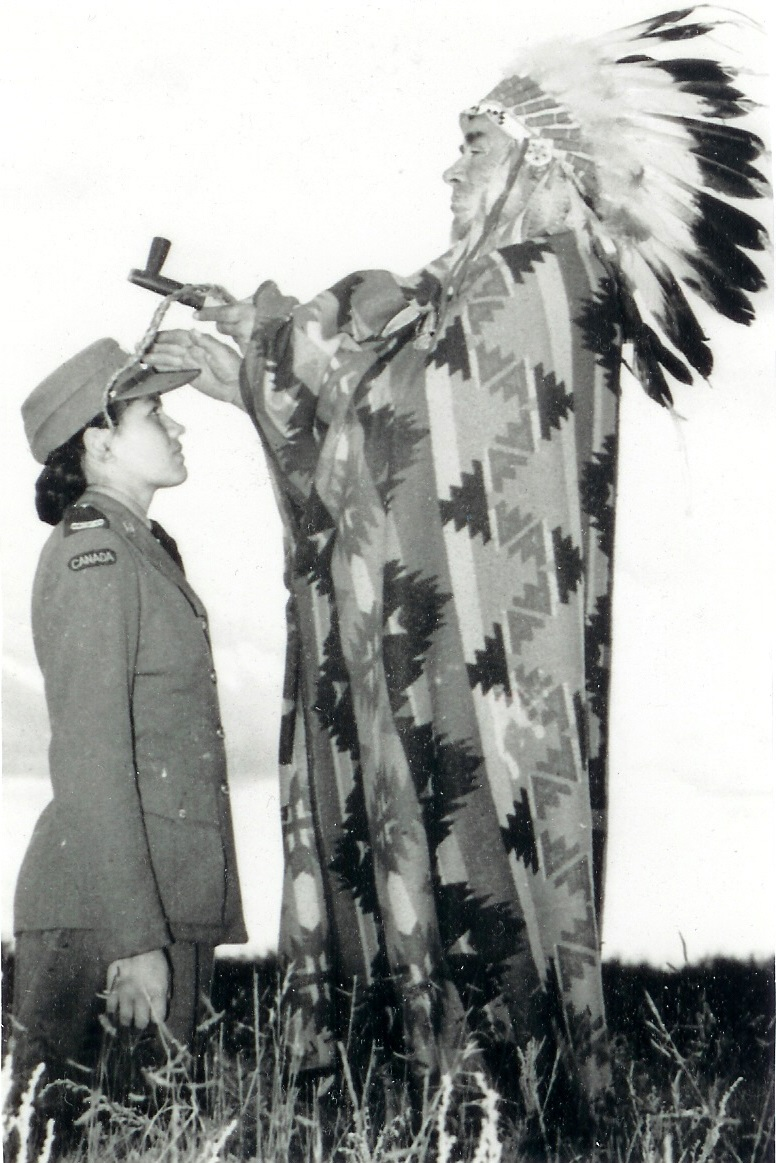
Mary Greyeyes (left) appeared in a famous army publicity photograph, taken in 1942.

=== Photograph ===
Shortly after enlisting, Greyeyes became the subject of an army publicity photograph that showed her kneeling in her army uniform to receive a "blessing" from a man dressed in Plains Cree Chief regalia.

During the war, Canadian MLA and public relations officer Louis LeBourdais often visited the training bases with photographers to take pictures of new CWAC recruits for newspaper publication. In June 1942, not long after she had enlisted, Greyeyes was approached and asked to participate in a photo-shoot to encourage more women to join the army. Harry Ball, a Cree man and World War I veteran from the Piapot First Nation, was convinced to pose for the photo in Plains Chief regalia. He was not an actual Chief himself at the time, though he would become one later, and had never met Greyeyes before. Ball had to cobble together his apparel from borrowed items. In return for the photo-shoot, which was staged on Piapot land, Ball was paid $20, while Greyeyes received a free lunch and a new uniform.

The photograph appeared in the Winnipeg Tribune and the Regina Leader-Post, and soon spread overseas to England, appearing in multiple British newspapers.

For decades, the photo would be identified only by a caption reading "Unidentified Indian princess getting blessing from her chief and father to go fight in the war". It was only around 1995 that the record was finally corrected, when Greyeyes's daughter-in-law, Melanie Fahlman Reid, learned that the photo hung in the Canadian War Museum with the incorrect caption. Reid, who had discussed the photo personally with Greyeyes, provided a more accurate explanation of the photograph from her mother-in-law's recollection.

=== Service and overseas work ===
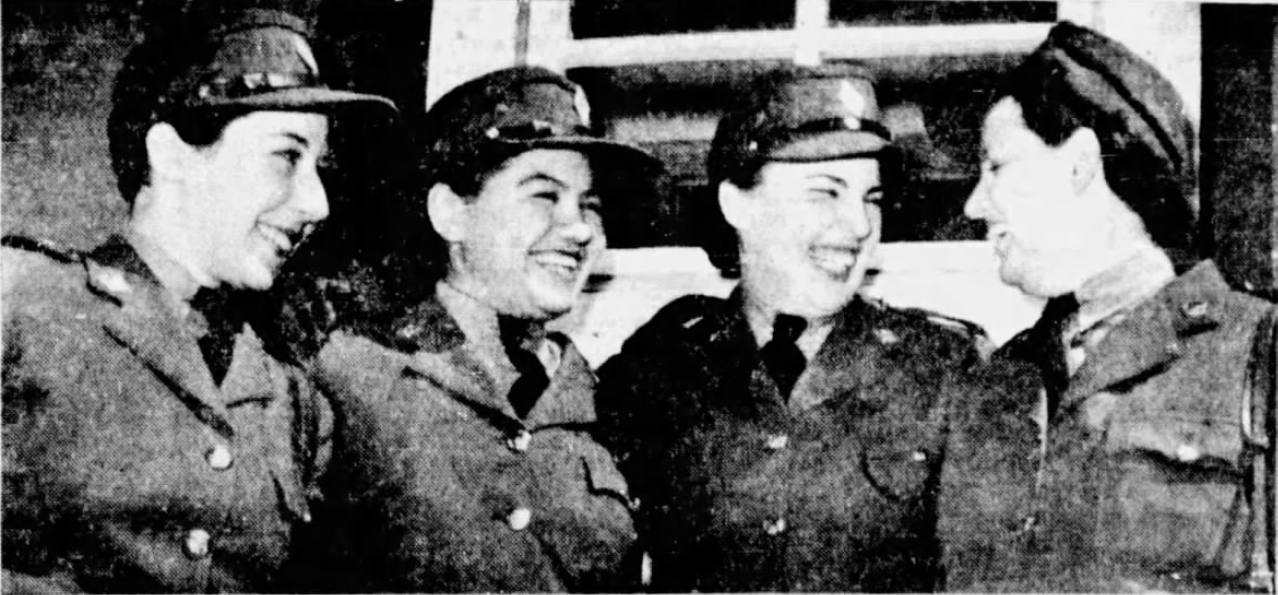
Mary Greyeyes (second from left) with fellow CWAC members newly arrived in Britain, c. 1943

Although officially integrated as part of the Canadian Army, CWAC did not train its members for combat roles, instead training women to support the war efforts through cooking, laundering, and clerical work. Greyeyes was sent overseas to Aldershot, England, to work at the Aldershot Base Laundry. She disliked her position there, and requested a transfer. Her superior tried to sabotage her transfer by writing the false statement "Does not speak English" on Greyeyes' papers, but she was granted her transfer anyway and went to work as a cook in the war centre at London. The Canadian Military Headquarters, in London was at 2–4 Cockspur Street next to Canada House.

As a result of the "Indian princess" photo, Greyeyes became famous in London as "the Indian" who had joined the army in support of the Empire and its colonies, receiving letters from strangers offering to marry her. She was even introduced to King George VI, Queen Elizabeth, and Princess Elizabeth. Greyeyes was photographed with a number of public figures.

Although Greyeyes sometimes encountered racism while in service – once resulting in her boarding outside the barracks – she found her overall army experience a positive one, later commenting that her wartime years had been "the best days of her life". She enjoyed the publicity she gained from being in the famous photo. Her love of learning was often noticed by others. One of her fellow corps members later recalled that Greyeyes was "a lovely young woman ... who spent much of her spare time reading and studying literature."

=== Second photo-shoot ===
According to an interview with her daughter-in-law, Mary Greyeyes was approached by government officials for a second publicity photo towards the end of the war. It was an election year, and Indigenous people did not have the right to vote in Canadian elections at the time, but Indigenous veterans from World War II were being offered the choice to give up their treaty rights and Indian status in return for voting rights. Greyeyes was urged to visit a polling station and have her picture taken while voting. Instead of agreeing to the photo-shoot this time, she pointed out the unfairness of the voting laws:

So Mary says to them, she says, "Can my mom vote?" And they said, "No, she didn't fight in the war." She said, "Well, what about my cousins over there, can they vote?" And they said no. They said, "C'mon Mary, you gotta come, we've got the photographer." And she said, "All those years, I said nothing. Now I'm saying no."

It was only in 1960 that all First Nations people were granted the right to vote in Canadian federal elections.

== Post-war life ==
When the war ended, Greyeyes continued working in London until she was discharged in 1946. Afterwards, she returned to Canada and went back to the Muskeg Lake reserve to spend time with family. She met her future husband, Alexander Reid, in Winnipeg, Manitoba. They moved to Victoria and had two children. Greyeyes worked as a restaurant cook in Victoria, later finding employment as an industrial seamstress when the family moved to Vancouver in the 1960s.

In August 1994, Greyeyes attended a reunion of over 400 CWAC members in Vermilion, Alberta. She received a pension from the Department of Veterans Affairs for her wartime service. In 2003, in recognition that post-war benefits had been poorly managed and delivered to Indigenous servicemen and women, the Canadian government paid compensation packages to Greyeyes and other surviving Indigenous veterans.

== Death ==
Greyeyes died on March 31, 2011, in Vancouver, British Columbia. She was 90 years old. Greyeyes was buried on the Muskeg Lake Cree Nation reserve.
