= David Greyeyes Steele =

Indigenous Canadian soldier, athlete, farmer and public servant (1914-1996)

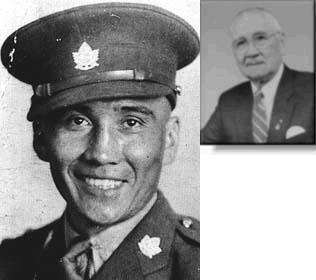
- Born: 31 December 1914; Muskeg Lake Cree Nation, Saskatchewan, Canada
- Died: 22 July 1996 (aged 81); Saskatoon, Saskatchewan, Canada
- Military career
- Allegiance: Canada
- Branch: Canadian Army
- Rank: Lieutenant
- Units: The Saskatoon Light Infantry; Royal Winnipeg Rifles
- Conflicts: Second World War
- Awards: Greek War Cross; Order of Canada; Saskatchewan Order of Merit

David Georges Greyeyes Steele, CM SOM, (31 December 1914 – 22 July 1996) was an Indigenous Canadian war hero, athlete, farmer, and public servant.

== Biography ==
Born in Muskeg Lake Cree Nation, Greyeyes Steele studied agriculture at the Lebret Industrial Residential School. He played multiple sports, but was particularly successful in soccer: he was a member of the Saskatchewan All-Star team three times and competed internationally.

He, two brothers, and his sister Mary Greyeyes enlisted in the Canadian Army during the Second World War. Greyeyes Steele taught advanced weaponry for two years before returning to Canada to qualify as an officer. He was the first Status Indian to achieve such a commission overseas. He was then assigned to The Saskatoon Light Infantry (Machine Gun) and commanded a mortar platoon in the Italian Campaign. He was awarded the Greek War Cross for his support of the 3rd Greek Mountain Brigade in the Battle of Rimini (1944). After VE Day he served as an intelligence officer with the Royal Winnipeg Rifles during the occupation of Germany. He played soccer in the 1946 Inter-Allied Games.

On his return to Canada, Greyeyes Steele married Flora Jeanne, and in 1958 became chief of the Muskeg Lake Cree Nation. He joined the Indian Affairs Branch of the Department of Citizenship and Immigration, eventually becoming the first Indigenous person named a regional director with this service.

He was named a Member of th Order of Canada and honoured in the Saskatchewan Sports Hall of Fame, both in 1977. He also received the Saskatchewan Order of Merit in 1993 and was an inaugural inductee in the Saskatchewan First Nations Sports Hall of Fame in 1994.
