= Iroquois Lake =

Lake in Saskatchewan, Canada

- Location in Saskatchewan Iroquois Lake (Canada)
- Location: RM of Leask No. 464, Saskatchewan
- Coordinates: 53.1667°N 107.0172°W
- Part of: Saskatchewan River drainage basin
- Primary inflows: Mistawasis Creek
- River sources: Thickwood Hills
- Primary outflows: Mistawasis Creek
- Basin countries: Canada
- Surface area: 1,109 ha (2,740 acres)
- Max. depth: 16.2 m (53 ft)
- Shore length^{1}: 25 km (16 mi)
- Surface elevation: 562 m (1,844 ft)
- Settlements: Pelican Cove; Pebble Baye
- ^{1} Shore length is not a well-defined measure.

Iroquois Lake is a lake in the Canadian province of Saskatchewan, about 90 kilometres (56 mi) west of Prince Albert. The lake is along the course of the east-flowing Mistawasis Creek, which has its source in the Thickwood Hills. Mistawasis Creek flows onto the lake at western shore and out at the north-east corner. The creek is a tributary of the Shell River, which is a tributary of the Sturgeon River in the North Saskatchewan River basin. The lake is in the Rural Municipality of Leask No. 464 and access is off Highway 12.

There are two communities and a cottage subdivision at the lake.

== Description ==
Iroquois Lake has an area of 1,109 hectares (2,740 acres), a maximum depth of 16.2 metres (53 ft), and a 25-kilometre (16 mi) long shoreline. It is along the course of Mistawasis Creek. Upstream and west of Iroquois Lake is the Thickwood Hills and downstream is Emerald Lake.

There are two communities on the lake. Pelican Cove is at the western end at the inflow of Mistawasis Creek. Pebble Baye is at the north-eastern corner where Mistawasis Creek flows out. At the southern end is Brooke's Beach and a cabin subdivision called the Woodlands on Iroquois.

== Fish species ==
Fish commonly found in Iroquois Lake include northern pike, walleye, lake whitefish, burbot, white sucker, and yellow perch.

== See also ==
- List of lakes of Saskatchewan
