= Lac la Pêche =

Lake in Saskatchewan, Canada

- Location in Saskatchewan Lac la Pêche (Canada)
- Location: RM of Leask No. 464, Saskatchewan
- Coordinates: 52.9448°N 107.0713°W
- Type: Spring-fed
- Part of: North Saskatchewan River drainage basin
- River sources: Thickwood Hills
- Basin countries: Canada
- Surface area: 99.7 ha (246 acres)
- Max. depth: 11.8 m (39 ft)
- Shore length^{1}: 5.6 km (3.5 mi)
- Settlements: Lac La Peche
- ^{1} Shore length is not a well-defined measure.

Lac la Pêche is a spring-fed lake in the Rural Municipality of Leask No. 464, Saskatchewan, Canada. It is situated in the Thickwood Hills about 30 kilometres (19 mi) south-west of Leask and 19 kilometres (12 mi) north of Blaine Lake. The small hamlet of Lac La Peche and Lac La Peche Resort are at the lake's southern end. Access to the lake and its amenities is from a gravel road off Highway 12.

Lac la Pêche is a small lake with an area just shy of 1 km^{2} (0.39 sq mi). Its shoreline measures about 5.6 kilometres (3.5 mi) and it is 11.8 metres (39 ft) deep.

== Fish species ==
Fish commonly found in Lac la Pêche include walleye, northern pike, white sucker, and yellow perch. The lake is stocked every few years with 100,000 walleye fry.

== See also ==
- List of lakes of Saskatchewan
- Tourism in Saskatchewan
