= Miriam Freedman =

Canadian veteran

Miriam "Mimi" Freedman (later Hart; 2 March 1911 – 23 April 1994) was a Canadian veteran who served in the Canadian Women's Army Corps (CWAC) during the Second World War.

Born in Montreal, Freedman joined the London Ambulance Service in 1939, serving as an ambulance driver in The Blitz. She returned in Canada in 1941 when she became pregnant, giving the baby up for adoption. In 1943 she became a CWAC driver and was "one of the first Canadian servicewomen to arrive on the continent" two months after D-Day. She worked as a translator in court proceedings in Germany due to her multilingual abilities – she could speak Flemish, German, English, French and Dutch. It was unusual at the time for a woman to serve in this role, but soldiers facing court martial "welcomed her service".

She "is believed to be the only Jewish Canadian enlisted woman to be decorated for bravery" during the Second World War. Returning to Canada in 1946, she married her cousin Bill Hart.
