= Pesch =

Pesch is a surname. Notable people with the surname include:

- Doro Pesch (born 1964), German singer
- Hans-Wilhelm Pesch (1937–2026), German politician
- Heinrich Pesch (1854–1926), German Jesuit and economist
- Jean-Louis Pesch (real name: Jean-Louis Poisson) (1928–2023), French author of comics series
- Marcel Pesch (1910–1985), Luxembourgian cyclist
- Nick Pesch (born 1974), Australian rules footballer
- Noah Pesch (born 2005), Croatian-German footballer
- Tilman Pesch (1836–1899), 19th-century German Jesuit philosopher

Fictional characters:

- Miriam Pesch, minor character in Verbotene Liebe

== See also ==
- Pesch, Cologne, part of Chorweiler, Cologne, Germany
- Jack Pesch Bridge, bridge for pedestrians and cyclists which crosses the Brisbane River
- 9399 Pesch, main-belt asteroid
- Pech (disambiguation)
