= Asimakaniseekan Askiy 102B =

Indian reserve in Saskatchewan, Canada

Coordinates: 52°07′44″N 106°42′36″W

- Indian reserve
- Asimakaniseekan Askiy Indian Reserve No. 102B
- Location in Saskatchewan
- First Nation: Muskeg Lake
- Country: Canada
- Province: Saskatchewan

Area
  - Total: 0.2 ha (0.49 acres)

Asimakaniseekan Askiy 102B is an Indian reserve of the Muskeg Lake Cree Nation in Saskatchewan. An urban reserve, it is located in the city of Saskatoon.

== See also ==
- List of Indian reserves in Saskatchewan
