= Pech =

Pech, Pèch or PECH may refer to:

- Pech (surname)
- Pech (Dungeons & Dragons), a creature in the Dungeons & Dragons series
- Pech (mythology), a type of gnome-like creatures in Scottish myth
- Pech (novel), a 2002 novel by Joanna Chmielewska
- Pech (river), in Nuristan and Kunar provinces of Afghanistan
- Pech, Ariège, France
- Pech people, an indigenous people in northeastern Honduras
- Pech language, spoken by the people
- Pèch, the Creole name for Perches, Nord-Est, Haiti
- European Parliament Committee on Fisheries (PECH), a committee of the European Parliament

== See also ==
- Peche (disambiguation)
- PECHS, one of the neighbourhoods of Jamshed Town in Karachi, Pakistan
- Pesch, a surname
