= Asimakaniseekan Askiy 102A =

Indian reserve in Saskatchewan, Canada

Coordinates: 52°07′42″N 106°35′04″W

- Indian reserve
- Asimakaniseekan Askiy Indian Reserve No. 102A
- Location in Saskatchewan
- First Nation: Muskeg Lake
- Country: Canada
- Province: Saskatchewan

Area
  - Total: 14.3 ha (35 acres)

Asimakaniseekan Askiy 102A is an Indian reserve of the Muskeg Lake Cree Nation in Saskatchewan. An urban reserve, it is located in the city of Saskatoon.

== See also ==
- List of Indian reserves in Saskatchewan
