= Pebble Baye =

Resort village in Saskatchewan, Canada

- Resort village
- Resort Village of Pebble Baye
- Location within Saskatchewan Location within Canada
- Coordinates: 53.189°N 107.022°W
- Country: Canada
- Province: Saskatchewan
- Census division: 16
- Rural municipality: RM of Leask No. 464
- Incorporated: January 1, 1983

Government
  - Mayor: Bonnie Kraus
  - Governing body: Resort Village Council
  - Administrator: Terry Lofstrom

Area (2016)
  - Land: 0.74 km^{2} (0.29 sq mi)

Population (2016)
  - Total: 45
  - Density: 60.8/km^{2} (157/sq mi)
- Time zone: CST
  - Summer (DST): CST
- Area codes: 306 and 639
- Waterway(s): Iroquois Lake

Pebble Baye (2016 population: 45) is a resort village in the Canadian province of Saskatchewan within Census Division No. 16. It is on the shores of Iroquois Lake where Mistawasis Creek flows out in the Rural Municipality of Leask No. 464.

== History ==
Pebble Baye incorporated as a resort village on January 1, 1983.

== Demographics ==
Population history (1981–2016)
| Year | Pop. | ±% |
|---|---|---|
| 1981 | | — |
| 1986 | 8 | — |
| 1991 | 9 | +12.5% |
| 1996 | 16 | +77.8% |
| 2001 | 15 | −6.2% |
| 2006 | 27 | +80.0% |
| 2011 | 33 | +22.2% |
| 2016 | 45 | +36.4% |
Source: Statistics Canada via Saskatchewan Bureau of Statistics

In the 2021 Census of Population conducted by Statistics Canada, Pebble Baye had a population of 69 living in 35 of its 119 total private dwellings, a change of 53.3% from its 2016 population of 45. With a land area of 0.68 km^{2} (0.26 sq mi), it had a population density of 101.5/km^{2} (262.8/sq mi) in 2021.

In the 2016 Census of Population conducted by Statistics Canada, the Resort Village of Pebble Baye recorded a population of 45 living in 21 of its 113 total private dwellings, a 36.4% change from its 2011 population of 33. With a land area of 0.74 km^{2} (0.29 sq mi), it had a population density of 60.8/km^{2} (157.5/sq mi) in 2016.

== Government ==
The Resort Village of Pebble Baye is governed by an elected municipal council and an appointed administrator. The mayor is Bonnie Kraus and its administrator is Terry Lofstrom.

== See also ==
- List of communities in Saskatchewan
- List of francophone communities in Saskatchewan
- List of resort villages in Saskatchewan
- List of summer villages in Alberta
