= Canadian Women's Army Corps =

Canadian Army branch, 1941–1946, 1948–1964

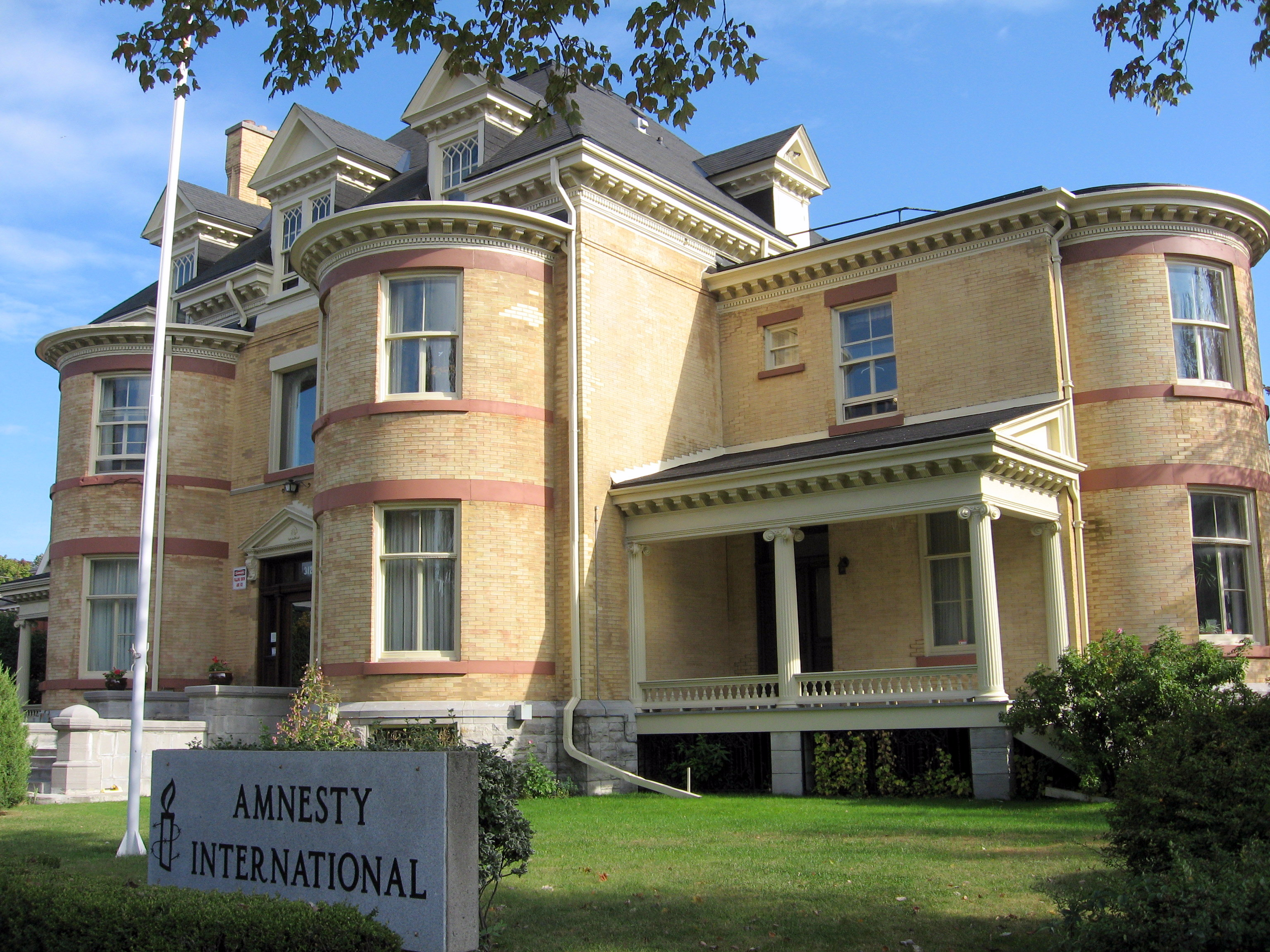
- Goodwin House, former Canadian Women's Army Corps headquarters
- Active: 1941–1946, 1948–1964
- Country: Canada
- Branch: Canadian Army
- Type: Administrative corps
- Role: Non-combatant roles

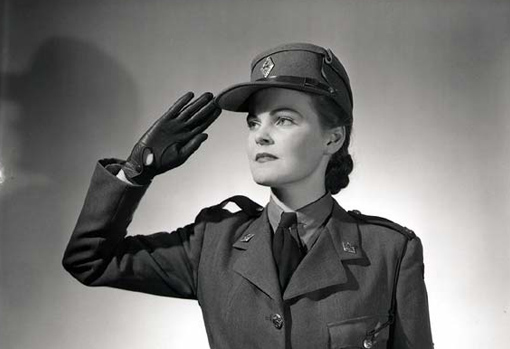
CWAC member, 1943

The Canadian Women's Army Corps was a non-combatant branch of the Canadian Army for women, established during the Second World War, with the purpose of releasing men from those non-combatant roles in the Canadian armed forces as part of expanding Canada's war effort. Most women served in Canada but some served overseas, most in roles such as secretaries, mechanics, cooks and so on. The CWAC was finally abolished as a separate corps in 1964 when women were fully integrated into the Canadian armed forces. The headquarters of the CWAC was based in Goodwin House in Ottawa.

== History ==
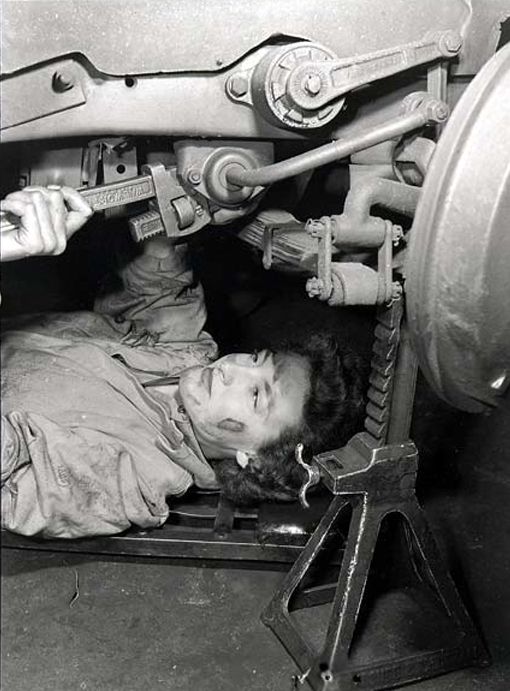
CWAC private tightening springs on vehicle in England, 1944

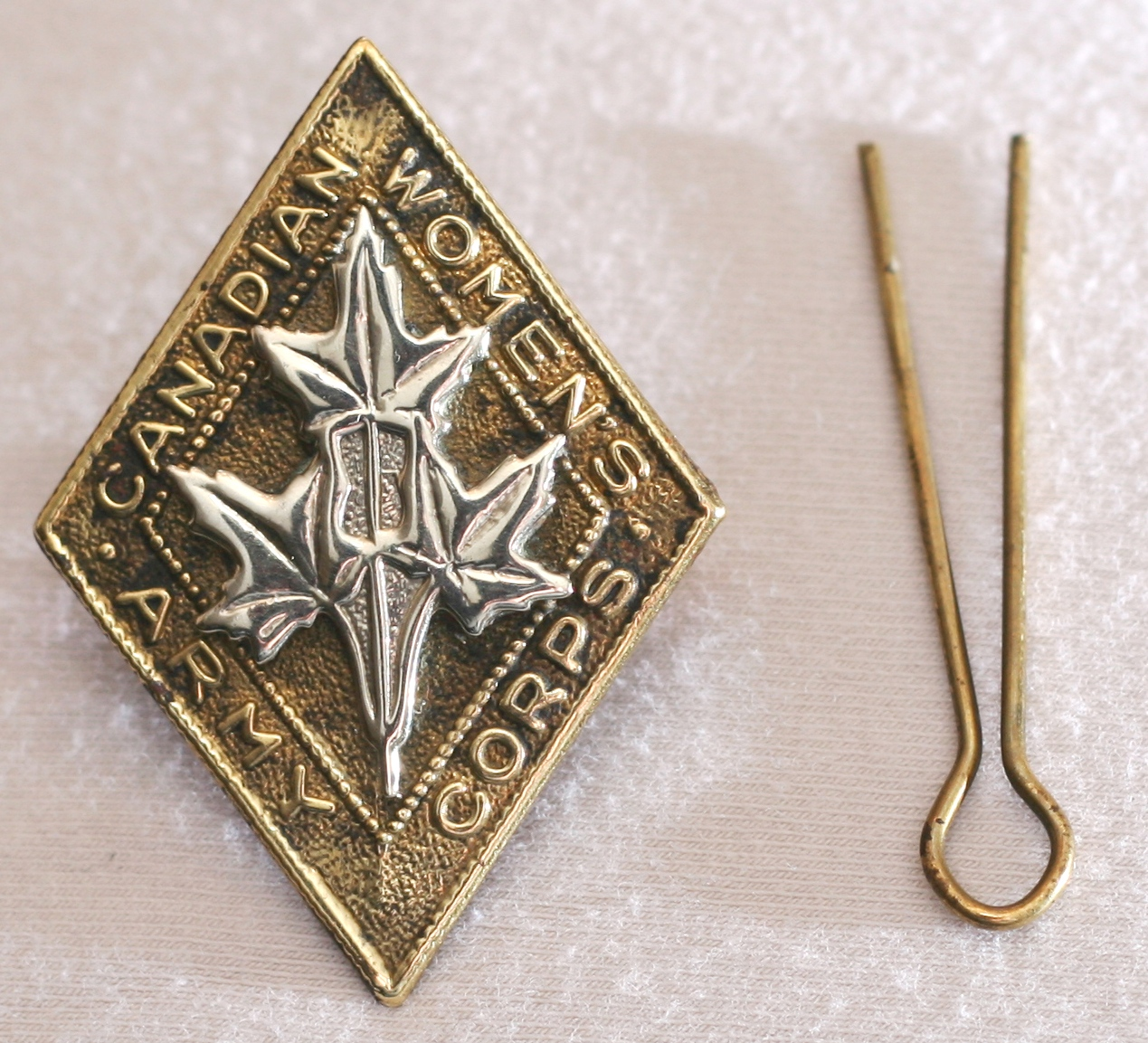
CWAC cap badge and fastener

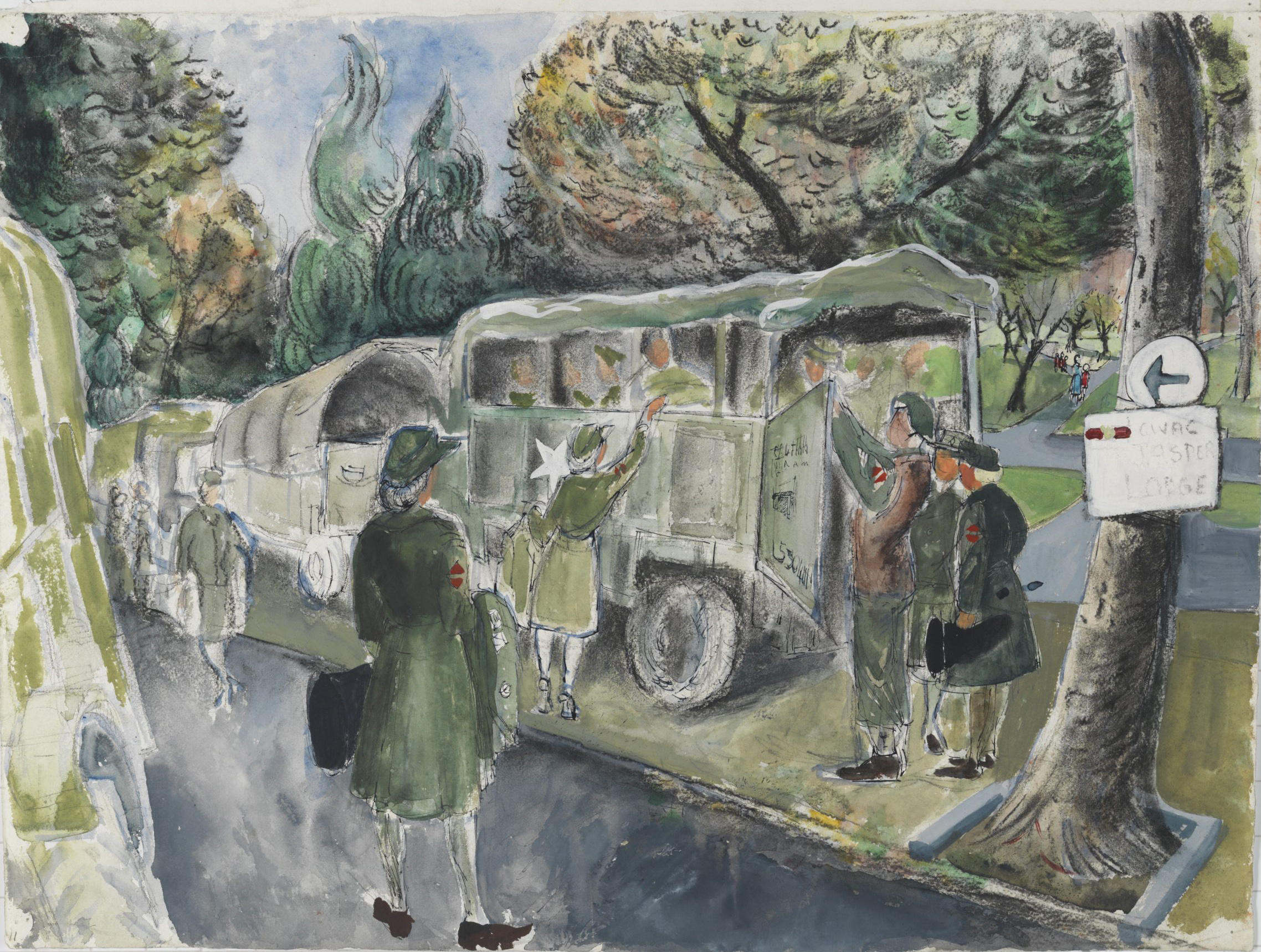
Canadian Women's Army Corps Brass Band (1945), by Molly Bobak

The Canadian Women's Army Corps (CWAC) was authorized on 13 August 1941, in response to a shortage of personnel caused by the increase in the size of Canada's navy, army and air force. The founding driving force to the unit's creation was Mrs. Joan Kennedy, of Victoria, British Columbia. She initially faced a great deal of opposition from conventional (male) military authorities. One senior army officer sneered at the very idea of what he called a "petticoat army." At first the organization was named the Canadian Women's Auxiliary Corps and was not an official part of the armed forces. On 13 March 1942, female volunteers were inducted into the Canadian Army and became the Canadian Women's Army Corps. They wore a cap badge of three maple leaves, and collar badges of the goddess Athena.

A February 1943 CWAC advertisement in the Edmonton Journal noted that prospective recruits had to be in excellent health, at least 5 feet (152 cm) tall and 105 pounds (48 kg) (or within 10 pounds (4.5 kg) above or below the standard of weight laid down in medical tables for different heights), with no dependents, a minimum of Grade 8 education, aged 18 to 45, and a British subject, as Canadians were at that time. Since women were not allowed to enter in combat of any kind the CWACs worked as secretaries, clerks, canteen workers, vehicle drivers and many other non-combat military jobs. They were only paid two-thirds of what the men were paid in the same occupation (this figure later became four-fifths).

CWACs served overseas, first in 1942 in Washington, DC, and then with the Canadian Army in the United Kingdom. In 1944 CWACs served in Italy and in 1945 in northwest Europe, usually as clerks in headquarters establishments. After VE Day, more served with Canadian occupation forces in Germany. Approximately 3000 served Canada overseas. While no members of the CWAC were killed in action, four were wounded in a German V-2 missile attack on Antwerp in 1945. "The CWAC was the largest force with 22,000 members, followed by the Air Force Women's Division with 17,000 and the WRCNS with just under 7,000." In August 1946 the CWACs were disbanded. The Canadian Women's Army Corps was re-designated The Canadian Women's Army Corps on 22 March 1948. The Canadian Women's Army Corps reverted to the Canadian Women's Army Corps on 18 Apr 1955. The CWACS were disbanded for good in 1964.

== Uniforms ==
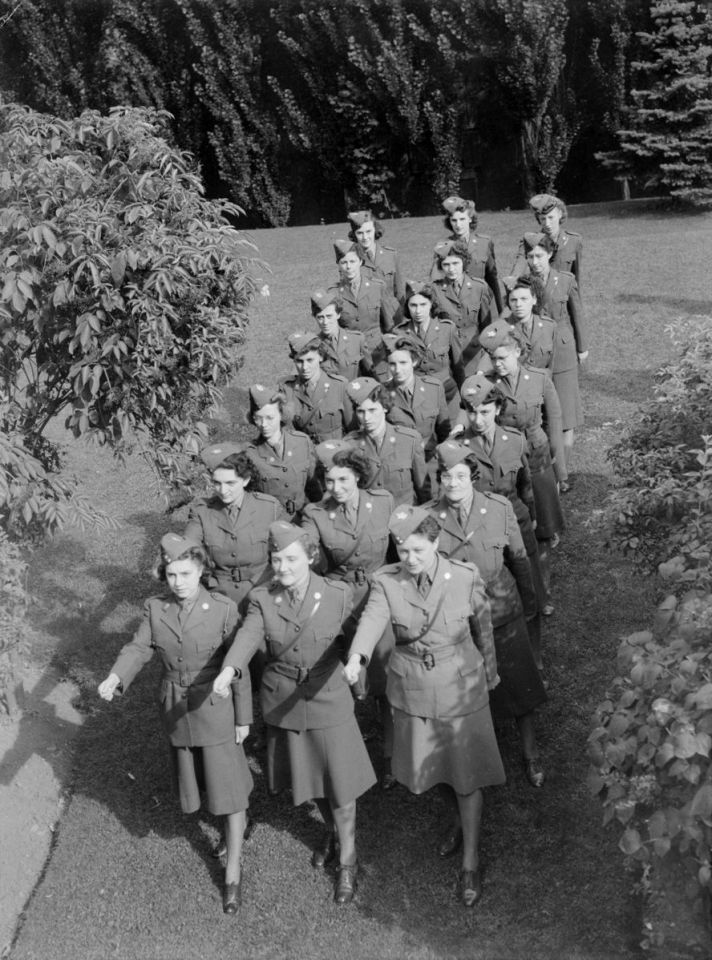
CWAC, 1942. Photo by Conrad Poirier.

The CWAC had many jobs with different uniforms. A canteen worker could wear overalls, a radioman could wear the battledress trousers and the battledress jacket (most common). Uniforms came in many different forms. Home front women usually wore dress skirts (or trousers) and round hats. If it was a job that meant getting your hands dirty, such as working on an engine of an airplane or vehicle, they would wear normal hardy clothing.

Official regulations regarding uniforms were that the women must wear a: "Khaki greatcoat, barathea skirt and hip-length jacket, peak cap with high crown, and a cap badge with three maple leaves on a stem on which was inscribed 'Canadian Women's Army Corps'. Helmeted head of Athene appears on buttons and badges."

== Postwar ==
After the Second World War, the CWAC and other military organizations were disbanded as women were finally incorporated into the Canadian Forces (CF). "The perceived unsuitability of women for military service, because of their alleged physical weakness and emotional instability in the face of danger, [was] an assumption which [had] been misused to justify the exclusion of women from active military duty."

With the changing tide of Canadian culture towards equality of the sexes, women were finally able to achieve full access to combative roles. No longer believed to be too weak or fragile to be engaged in conflict and confined solely to their homes and families, women were finally given their chance to participate fully in the Canadian military.

Today, Canadian women still represent only a small fraction of the total population of the Canadian Forces. However, the CF is committed to following the principles laid out in the Canadian Constitution, guaranteeing "that every citizen has equal rights and responsibilities", which has led the "Canadian Forces to expand employment opportunities for women. The ultimate responsibility of the CF, however, remains the maintenance of national security."

== Effect on equality within Canada ==
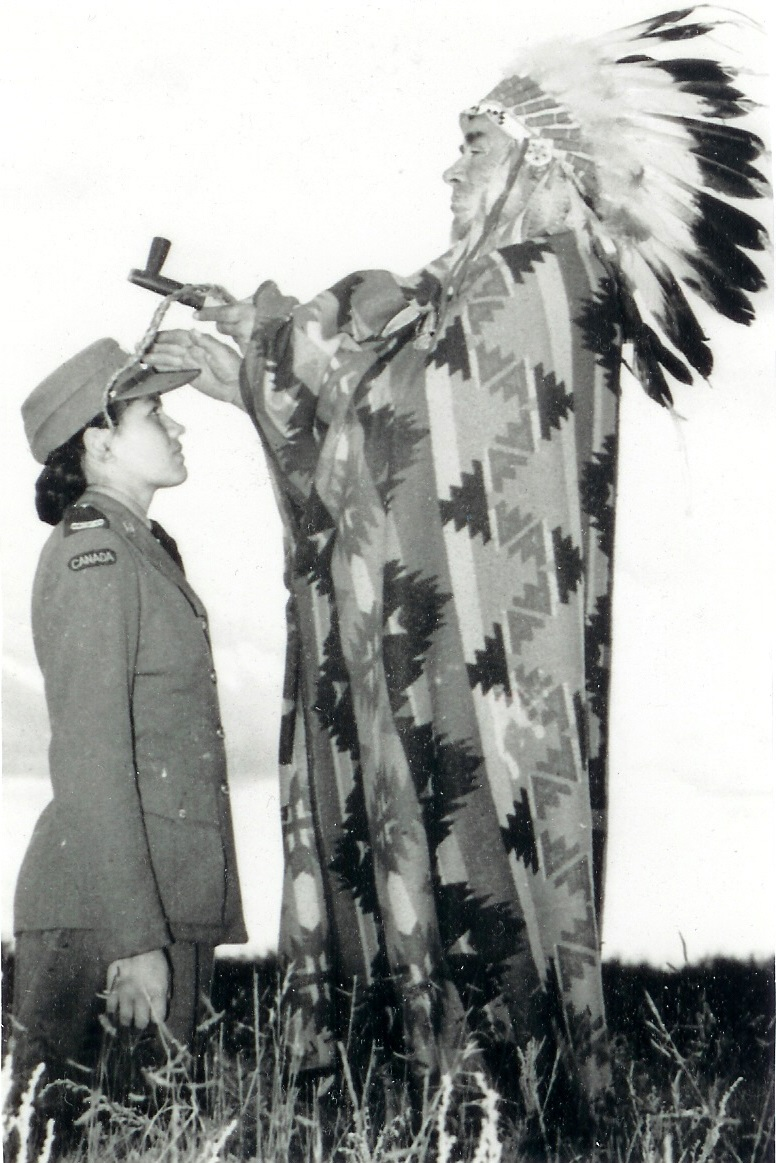
Mary Greyeyes, of the Muskeg Lake Cree Nation, served in Canada and Britain

The CWAC and other military organizations were aimed at attracting young women into the Canadian forces during the Second World War, and paved the way for women's future involvement in combat. With tens of thousands of women involved in these organizations, it provided Canadian women with the opportunity to do their part in a global conflict. Although their involvement was critical to the Allied victory, it did not change the power dynamics within Canada regarding military involvement. Sexism returned following the war, forcing women in Canada, and across the world, back into their homes and kitchens. "Women's admittance to the army in World War II had not brought about a change in the distribution of power between the sexes in Canada." The freedom they had experienced during the war was over—it was time to return to their "normal" and "proper" domestic duties. Other scholars argue that the Second World War provided women with the first large-scale opportunity to leave their parents' homes, husbands, and children to engage in paid labour. Never before had this happened at such a high rate for women. This mass exodus of women from Canadian households allowed the women to forge new identities as military service women and munitions workers because of their newfound ability to earn a paycheque doing work in the public sphere. This brief period of freedom provided women across the world with the ability to enter into the public sphere and would eventually drive some to become part of the women's liberation movement—a key aspect of second-wave feminism.

== Related organizations ==
This corps was allied with Britain's Auxiliary Territorial Service (ATS), which was integrated with the Women's Royal Army Corps in 1949.

== Memorials ==
Canadian Women's Army Corps (2000) by André Gauthier is a 6-foot-4-inch (1.93 m)-high bronze statue in front of the Kitchener Armoury in Kitchener, Ontario.

Erected by local ex-servicewomen, a memorial in Salmon Arm, BC, was dedicated on 14 August 2000 to all Canadian women who served in the First and Second World Wars and the Korean War.

== See also ==
- Mary Greyeyes, who became the first First Nations woman to enlist in the Canadian Armed Forces upon joining the Canadian Women’s Army Corps in 1942.
- Royal Canadian Air Force Women's Division
- Women's Royal Canadian Naval Service
- Canadian Women's Army Corps Band

== Bibliography ==
- Auger, Geneviève and Raymonde Lamothe. De la poêle à frire à la ligne de feu: La vie quotidienne des Québécoises pendant la guerre '39 - '45. Montréal: Boréal Express, 1981.
- Bowley, Patricia, and Kris Wright. "Canadian Enlisted Women: Gender Issues in the Canadian Armed Forces before and after 1945." Minerva: Women & War 15, no. 1 (March 1997): 9-25.
- Bruce, Jean. Back the Attack! Canadian Women During the Second World War - At Home and Abroad. Toronto: Macmillan of Canada, 1985.
- Conrod, W. Hugh. Athene, Goddess of War: The Canadian Women's Army Corps - Their Story. Dartmouth: Writing and Editorial Services, 1984.
- Gossage, Carolyn. Greatcoats and Glamour Boots: Canadian Women at War (1939–1945). Toronto: Dundurn Press, 1991.
- Lamerson, C D (31 December 1989). "The Evolution Of A Mixed-Gender Canadian Forces". Minerva. 7 (3). Pasadena: 19. ProQuest 222786057.
- Parr, Joy. A Diversity of Women: Ontario, 1945-1980. Toronto: University of Toronto Press, 1995.
- Pierson, Ruth Roach (20 April 2006). "'Jill Canuck': CWAC of All Trades, But No 'Pistol Packing Momma'". Historical Papers. 13 (1): 106–133. doi:10.7202/030480ar.
- Pierson, Ruth Roach (1986). They're Still Women After All: The Second World War and Canadian Womanhood. McClelland and Stewart. ISBN 978-0-7710-6958-1.
- Roe Kathleen Robson. War Letters from the C.W.A.C. Toronto: Kakabeka Publishing Co., 1975.
- Thrift, Gayle (22 June 2011). "'This is our war, too': Mary Dover, Commandant of the Canadian Women's Army Corps". Alberta History. 59 (3): 2–13. Gale A264270504.
