= Joan Kennedy (soldier) =

Canadian soldier

Joan Kennedy (born Joan Barbara Fensham; 1908–1956) was a Canadian soldier.

Born in Middlesex, Kennedy moved to Victoria, British Columbia as a teenager and later worked as an accountant. When the Second World War began she founded the British Columbia Women's Service Corp to train women in noncombatant roles. She was "the founding and driving force behind the creation" of the Canadian Women's Army Corps in 1941. Kennedy was appointed commander-in-chief of the corps at the rank of lieutenant colonel – the first woman to receive a commission in the Canadian Army.

Kennedy left the army in 1946 and died in 1956.
