= Lake Pitihkwakew 102B =

Indian reserve in Saskatchewan, Canada

Coordinates: 53°05′30″N 107°14′07″W

- Indian reserve
- Lake Pitihkwakew Indian Reserve No. 102B
- Location in Saskatchewan
- First Nation: Muskeg Lake
- Country: Canada
- Province: Saskatchewan

Area
  - Total: 1,115 ha (2,760 acres)

Lake Pitihkwakew 102B is an Indian reserve of the Muskeg Lake Cree Nation in Saskatchewan. It is 35 kilometres (22 mi) north-west of Blaine Lake.

== See also ==
- List of Indian reserves in Saskatchewan
