= Isabel Macneill =

Canadian Navy officer (1908–1990)

Isabel Janet Macneill, OC, OBE (4 June 1908 – 18 August 1990) was a Canadian Women's Royal Canadian Naval Service officer and public servant.

Appointed commander of the stone frigate HMCS Conestoga in 1943, Macneill was the first Canadian woman to command a naval establishment.

After the Second World War, she became a prison superintendent.
