= Lac La Peche =

Hamlet in Saskatchewan, Canada

Coordinates: 52.9373°N 107.0712°W

Location of Lac La Peche in Saskatchewan

Lac La Peche is a hamlet in Saskatchewan, Canada. It is at the southern end of the spring-fed Lac la Pêche in the Thickwood Hills about 30 kilometres (19 mi) south-west of Leask and 19 kilometres (12 mi) north of Blaine Lake. The community is within the Rural Municipality of Leask No. 464 and consists of two subdivision and Lac la Peche Resort. Access is from gravel roads off Highway 12.

== See also ==
- List of communities in Saskatchewan
- Tourism in Saskatchewan
