= Adelaide Sinclair =

Canadian civil servant (1900–1982)

Adelaide Helen Grant Sinclair OC OBE
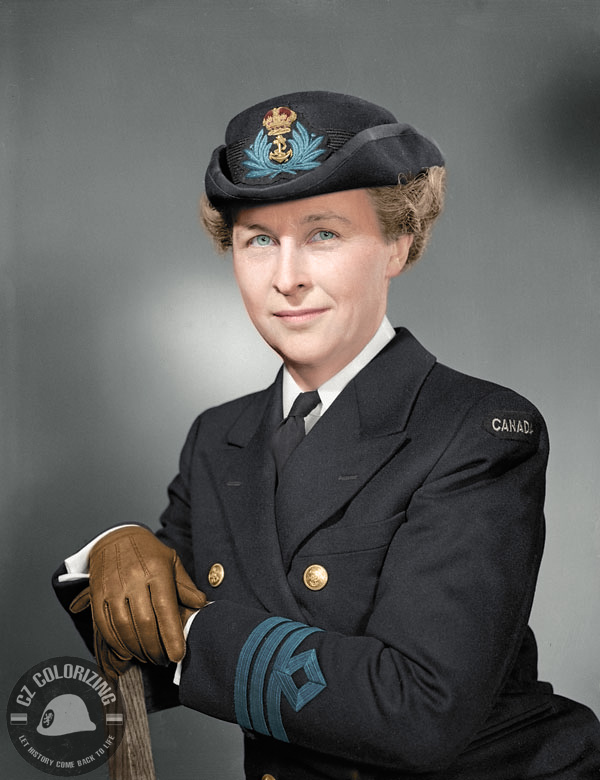
- Born: January 16, 1900; Toronto, Ontario, Canada
- Died: November 20, 1982 (aged 82); Ottawa, Ontario, Canada
- Known for: deputy executive director for programs of the United Nations International Children's Emergency Fund; Director, Women's Royal Canadian Naval Service

Adelaide Helen Grant Sinclair, OC OBE (January 16, 1900 – November 20, 1982) was a Canadian public servant. She was the second Chairman of the UNICEF Executive Board from 1951 to 1952, and from 1957 to 1967, she was the deputy executive director for programs of UNICEF, and one of the highest ranking women at the United Nations.

Born in Toronto, Ontario, the daughter of Dr. and Mrs. Overton Macdonald, she attended Havergal College and received a Bachelor of Arts degree in economics from University College, University of Toronto in 1922 and a Master of Arts in 1925. She was a member of Kappa Alpha Theta at the University of Toronto. She did post-graduate work at the London School of Economics from 1926 to 1929 and the University of Berlin in 1929. She lectured in economics and political science at the University of Toronto.

In 1930 she married Donald Black Sinclair, a Toronto lawyer, who died in 1938. The couple had no children.

During World War II, she was the Director and temporary Commander of the Women's Royal Canadian Naval Service (WRCNS). She was made an Officer of the Order of the British Empire in the New Year Honours 1945 for her "untiring zeal and outstanding ability, tact and judgement in organizing the Women's Royal Canadian Naval Service into a most efficient and well-disciplined unit".

From 1946 to 1957, she was the executive assistant to the Deputy Minister of National Health and Welfare and Canadian representative to UNICEF. From 1957 until her retirement in 1967, she was the Deputy Director of UNICEF.

In 1967, she was made an Officer of the Order of Canada. She received an honorary degree from the University of British Columbia in 1968.
