= Marcelin, Saskatchewan =

Village in Saskatchewan, Canada

Marcelin
- Village
- Location of Marcelin in Saskatchewan Marcelin (Canada)
- Coordinates: 52.927°N 106.791°W
- Country: Canada
- Province: Saskatchewan
- Census division: 16
- Rural municipality: Blaine Lake No. 434
- Post office Founded: 1904

Government
  - Mayor: Norman Desjardins
  - Administrator: Leanne McCormick
  - Governing body: Marcelin Village Council

Area
  - Total: 1.32 km^{2} (0.51 sq mi)

Population (2011)
  - Total: 158
  - Density: 119.5/km^{2} (310/sq mi)
- Time zone: CST
- Postal code: S0J 1R0
- Area code: 306
- Highways: Highway 40; Highway 786
- Website: marcelin.ca

Marcelin (2016 population: 153) is a village in the Canadian province of Saskatchewan within the Rural Municipality of Blaine Lake No. 434 and Census Division No. 16. It was named after the first postmaster Antoine Marcelin in 1904.

Marcelin is the administrative headquarters of the Muskeg Lake Cree Nation band government. During World War II, the Muskeg Lake reserve had the highest rates of Indigenous enlistment in the country, and Mary Greyeyes became the first First Nations woman to enlist in the Canadian Forces.

== History ==
Marcelin incorporated as a village on September 25, 1911.

== Demographics ==
Population history (1981–2016)
Year	Pop.	±%
1981	238	—
1986	224	−5.9%
1991	193	−13.8%
1996	182	−5.7%
2001	167	−8.2%
2006	169	+1.2%
2011	158	−6.5%
2016	153	−3.2%
Source: Statistics Canada via Saskatchewan Bureau of Statistics

In the 2021 Census of Population conducted by Statistics Canada, Marcelin had a population of 142 living in 71 of its 87 total private dwellings, a change of −7.2% from its 2016 population of 153. With a land area of 1.29 km^{2} (0.50 sq mi), it had a population density of 110.1/km^{2} (285.1/sq mi) in 2021.

In the 2016 Census of Population, the village of Marcelin recorded a population of 153 living in 76 of its 90 total private dwellings, a −3.3% change from its 2011 population of 158. With a land area of 1.32 km^{2} (0.51 sq mi), it had a population density of 115.9/km^{2} (300.2/sq mi) in 2016.

== See also ==
- List of communities in Saskatchewan
- List of francophone communities in Saskatchewan
- List of villages in Saskatchewan
