= Therese Peche =

German-born Austrian stage actor (1806–1882)

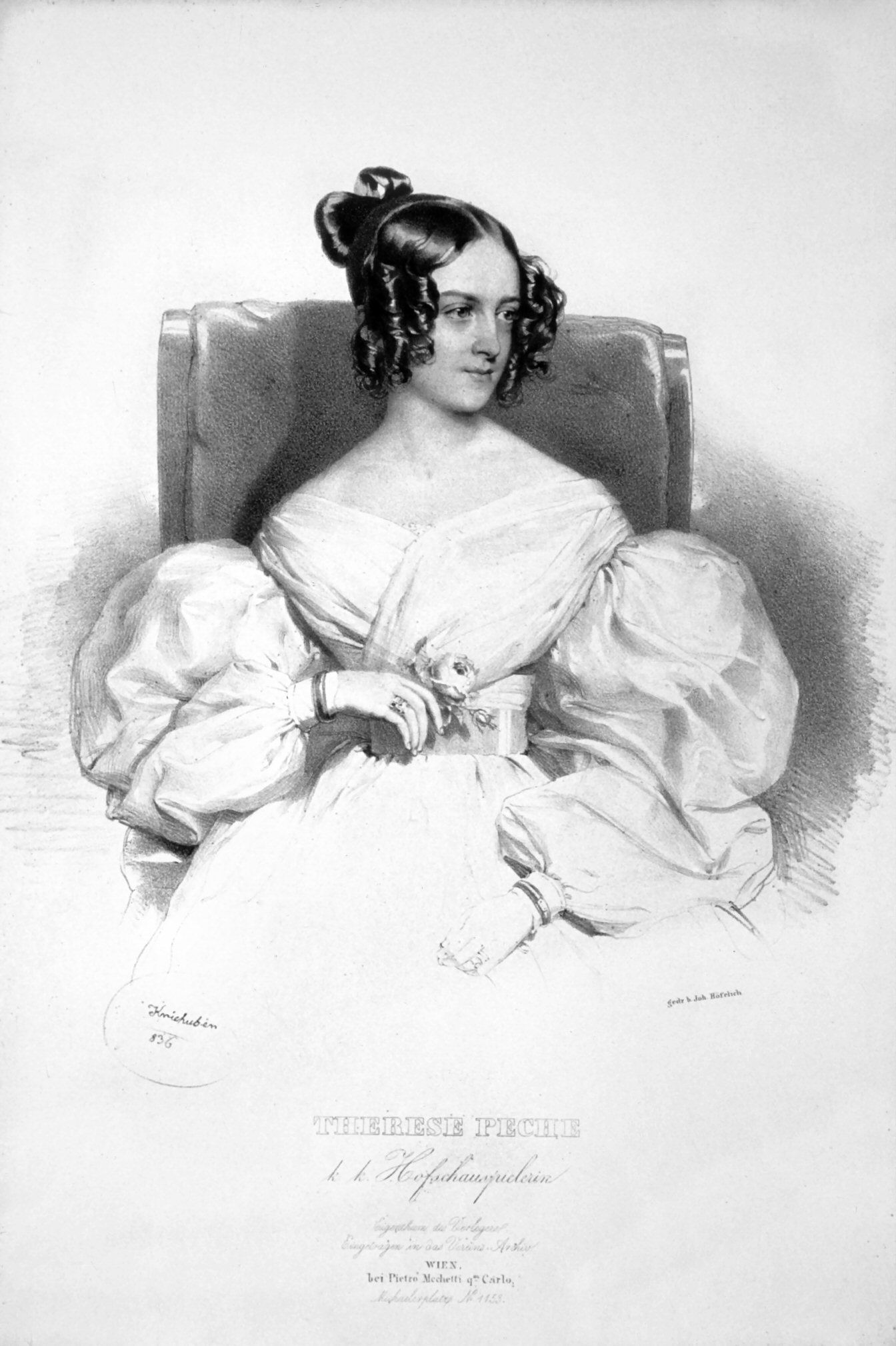
Therese Peche

Therese Peche (1806–1882), was a German-born Austrian stage actress.

She was engaged at the Burgtheater in Vienna between 1830 and 1867. She was a leading elite member of the theatre. For many years, she was known for playing the heroine in famous classical plays of Shakespeare. During her last years on stage, she played aristocratic ladies.

The Pechegasse in Vienna was named after her in 1930.
