= Pelican Cove =

Community in Saskatchewan, Canada

Coordinates: 53°10′00″N 107°03′13″W

Pelican Cove is a hamlet in the Canadian province of Saskatchewan. It is on the western shore of Iroquois Lake where Mistawasis Creek flows in and access is from Highway 12.

== Demographics ==
In the 2021 Census of Population conducted by Statistics Canada, Pelican Cove had a population of 69 living in 39 of its 88 total private dwellings, a change of 64.3% from its 2016 population of 42. With a land area of 0.33 km^{2} (0.13 sq mi), it had a population density of 209.1/km^{2} (541.5/sq mi) in 2021.

== See also ==
- List of communities in Saskatchewan
