= Muskeg Lake 102B =

Indian reserve in Saskatchewan, Canada

Coordinates: 53°04′01″N 107°26′18″W

- Indian reserve
- Muskeg Lake Indian Reserve No. 102B
- Location in Saskatchewan
- First Nation: Muskeg Lake
- Country: Canada
- Province: Saskatchewan

Area
  - Total: 969.6 ha (2,396 acres)

Population (2016)
  - Total: 0
  - Density: 0.0/km^{2} (0.0/sq mi)

Muskeg Lake 102B is an Indian reserve of the Muskeg Lake Cree Nation in Saskatchewan. It is about 67 kilometres (42 mi) north-east of North Battleford. In the 2016 Canadian Census, it recorded a population of 0 living in 0 of its 0 total private dwellings.

== See also ==
- List of Indian reserves in Saskatchewan
