= Women's Royal Canadian Naval Service =

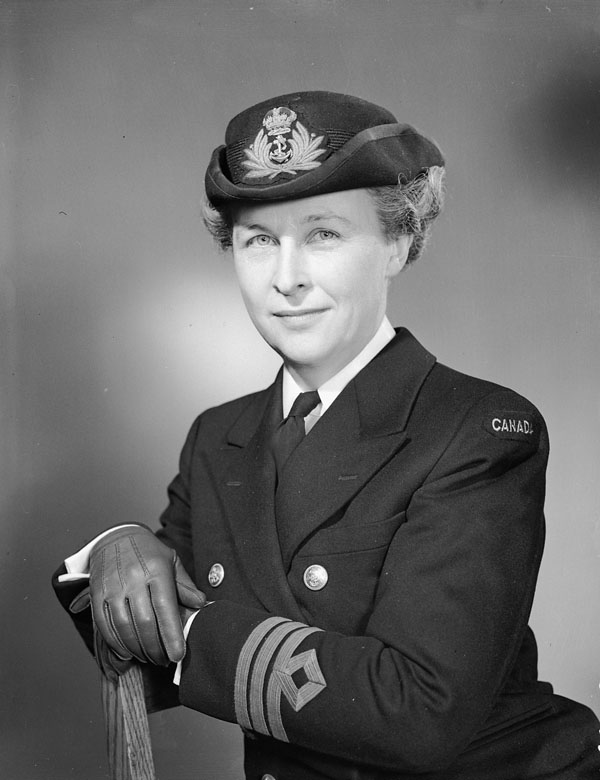
- Commander Adelaide Sinclair was Director of the Women's Royal Canadian Naval Service in 1944
- Active: 1942–1946; 1951–1968
- Disbanded: August 1946; February 1968
- Country: Canada
- Branch: Royal Canadian Navy
- Role: Operational support, Various duties
- March: The Wren's March

The Women's Royal Canadian Naval Service (WRCNS or "Wrens") was an element of the Royal Canadian Navy that was active during the Second World War and post-war as part of the Royal Canadian Naval Reserve until unification in 1968. The WRCNS was in operation from October 1942 to August 1946.

== History ==
The WRCNS was modelled on the Women's Royal Naval Service, which had been active during the First World War and then revived in 1939. The Royal Canadian Navy was slow to create a women's service, only establishing the WRCNS in July 1942, nearly a year after the Canadian Women's Army Corps and the Royal Canadian Air Force Women's Division. By the end of the war however nearly 7,000 women had served with the WRCNS in 39 trades.

The ByTown II, later renamed HMCS Conestoga ("The Stone Frigate"), was the WRCNS training centre in Galt, Ontario, and became the first female-commanded Canadian commissioned "ship" in June 1943 when Lieutenant Commander Isabel Macneill was appointed commanding officer. That September Commander Adelaide Sinclair became the first Canadian Director of the WRCNS, a position she held until disbandment.

The WRCNS was disbanded in July 1946, but revived as part of the Naval Reserve at the beginning of the Korean War. It was disbanded a second time in 1968 when the Royal Canadian Navy as a whole was folded into the unified Canadian Forces.

A Historic Sites and Monuments' board of Canada plaque in Halifax describes the Women's Royal Canadian Naval Service:

Women's service in the military during the Second World War challenge the tradition of all-male armed forces. Between 1942 and 1946 close to 7000 volunteers enlisted in the WRCNS and served in 26 non-combatant occupations in Canadian naval bases at home or abroad. By late 1943, nearly 1000 Wrens worked in the Halifax area and lived in HMCS Stadacona, within sight of this spot. The WRCNS made an outstanding contribution to Allied victory, paved the way for future generations of Canadian service women and raised questions about the equality of women in the civilian world.

== Ranks ==
NATO code	OF-10	OF-9	OF-8	OF-7	OF-6	OF-5	OF-4	OF-3	OF-2	OF-1
Canada	No equivalent				N/A							No equivalent
Canada	No equivalent			Rear-Admiral; Contre-amiral	Commodore; Commodore	Captain; Capitaine	Commander; Commander	Lieutenant-Commander; Lieutenant-commander	Lieutenant; Lieutenant	Sub-Lieutenant; Sous-lieutenant	Acting Sub-Lieutenant; Sous-lieutenant intérimaire	No equivalent

NATO code	OR-9	OR-8	OR-7	OR-6	OR-5	OR-4	OR-3	OR-2	OR-1
Canada	N/A	N/A	N/A	N/A	No equivalent
Canada	N/A	N/A	N/A	N/A	No equivalent	N/A	N/A	N/A
Canada	Chief Petty Officer 1st class; Premier maître de 1^{re} classe	Chief Petty Officer 2nd class; Premier maître de 2^{e} classe	Petty Officer 1st class; Maître de 1^{re} classe	Petty Officer 2nd class; Maître de 2^{e} classe	No equivalent	Leading Seaman; Matelot de 1^{re} classe	Able Seaman; Matelot de 2^{e} classe	Ordinary Seaman; Matelot de 3^{e} classe

== Wargaming ==
One of the departments was in charge of teaching anti-submarine warfare tactics to the captains of the vessels escorting convoys across the Atlantic. Carol Duffus (née Hendry), explained in an interview how the wargame was facilitated and debriefed by the training commander.

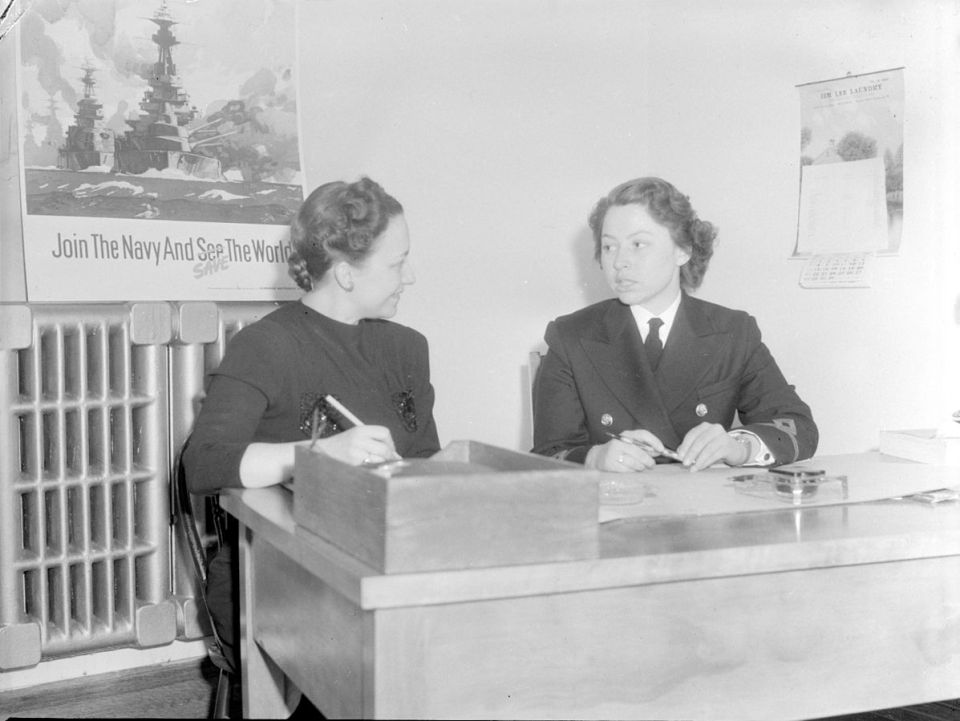
A journalist (left) interviewing a woman in uniform (right) from the Women's Royal Canadian Naval Service, 1943

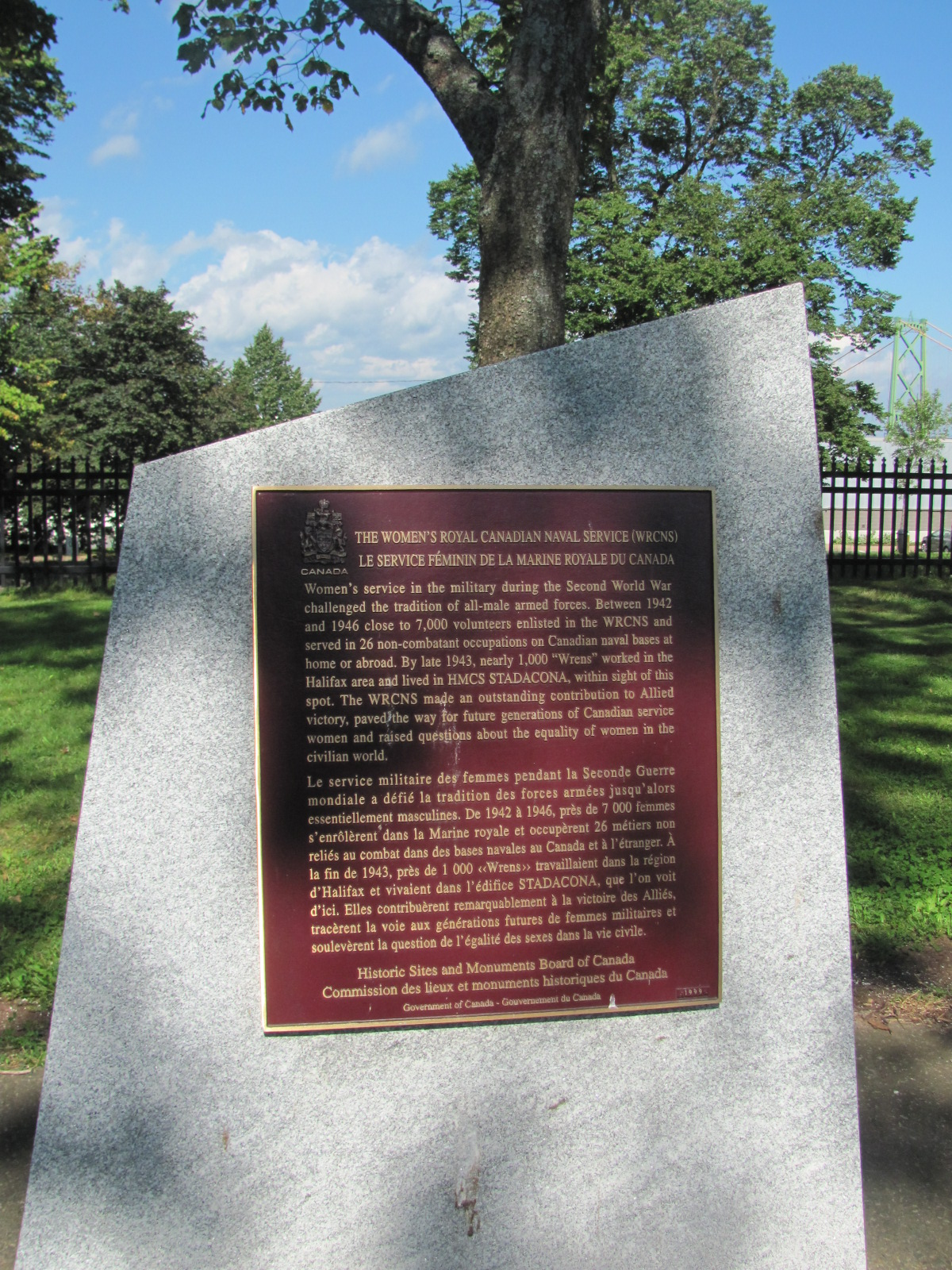
Wrens plaque at the Maritime Command Museum

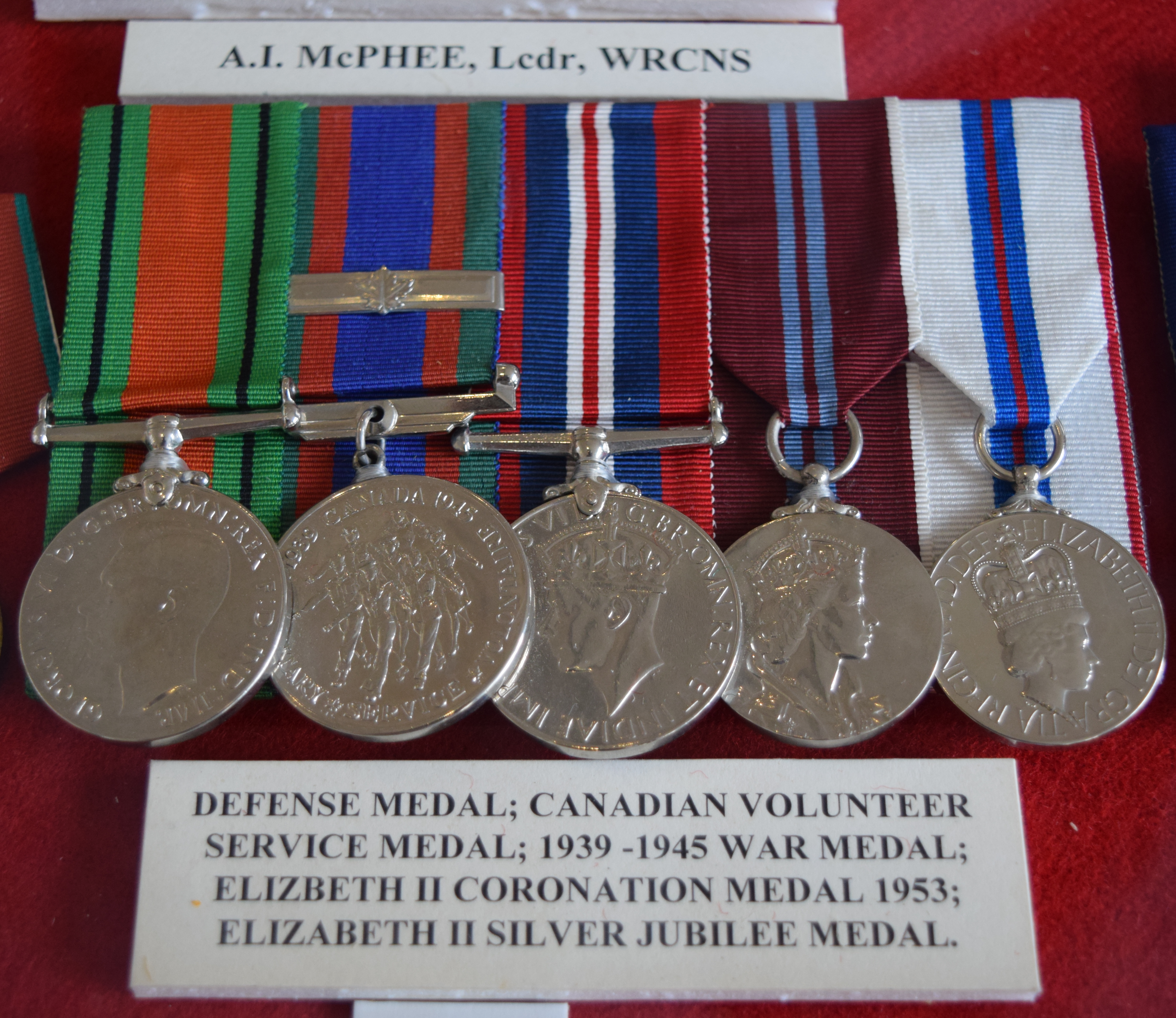
Medals of a woman in the service

== See also ==
- Canadian Women's Army Corps
- Royal Canadian Air Force Women's Division
- Women's Royal Australian Naval Service
- Women's Royal New Zealand Naval Service
- Adelaide Sinclair
- SPARS (the United States Coast Guard Women's Reserve)
- United States Marine Corps Women's Reserve
- Women in the United States Navy
- Women's Royal Naval Service (British)
