= Rural Municipality of Leask No. 464 =

Rural municipality in Saskatchewan, Canada

Leask No. 464
- Rural municipality
- Rural Municipality of Leask No. 464
- Location of the RM of Leask No. 464 in Saskatchewan
- Coordinates: 53.018°N 106.813°W
- Country: Canada
- Province: Saskatchewan
- Census division: 16
- SARM division: 5
- Formed: December 9, 1912

Government
  - Reeve: Len Cantin
  - Governing body: RM of Leask No. 464 Council
  - Administrator: Judy Douglas
  - Office location: Leask

Area (2016)
  - Land: 1,257.36 km^{2} (485.47 sq mi)

Population (2016)
  - Total: 686
  - Density: 0.5/km^{2} (1.3/sq mi)
- Time zone: CST
  - Summer (DST): CST
- Area codes: 306 and 639

The Rural Municipality of Leask No. 464 (2016 population: 686) is a rural municipality (RM) in the Canadian province of Saskatchewan within Census Division No. 16 and SARM Division No. 5. It is located west of the city of Prince Albert.

== History ==
The RM of Leask No. 464 incorporated as a rural municipality on December 9, 1912.

St. Paul's Lutheran Church (Silvergrove) is an historic site of Canada located in the RM.

== Geography ==
The RM of Leask No. 464 is adjacent to the RMs of Duck Lake No. 463 to the east, Shellbrook No. 493 to the northeast, Blaine Lake No. 434 to the south, Redberry No. 435 to the southwest, and Spiritwood No. 496 to the west.

=== Communities and localities ===
The following urban municipalities are surrounded by the RM.

Villages

- Leask
- Parkside

The following unincorporated communities are within the RM.

Organized hamlets

- Pelican Cove

Localities

- Pebble Baye
- Lac La Peche

Mistawasis 103 and several separate reserves of the Muskeg Lake Cree Nation are also surrounded by the RM.

== Martins Lake Regional Park ==
Martins Lake Regional Park (53.0013°N 106.9892°W) is in the RM of Leask on eastern shore of Martins Lake and adjacent to Muskeg Lake 102M Indian reserve. The regional park has a campground, golf course, sandy beach, picnic area, restaurant, and boat launch. The lake is 114 ha (280 acres) in size and 18.9 m (62 ft) deep and has a population of walleye and northern pike. The campground has over 140 campsites—about half of which are seasonal only—with modern washrooms, showers, and electric hook ups.

Martin's Lake Regional Park Golf Club is a 9-hole golf course with artificial greens, 3,007 yards, and par 36. There is also a licensed clubhouse and rentals.

== Demographics ==
Population history (1981–2016)
Year	Pop.	±%
1981	1,105	—
1986	1,027	−7.1%
1991	913	−11.1%
1996	846	−7.3%
2001	761	−10.0%
2006	846	+11.2%
2011	775	−8.4%
2016	686	−11.5%
Source: Statistics Canada via Saskatchewan Bureau of Statistics

In the 2021 Census of Population conducted by Statistics Canada, the RM of Leask No. 464 had a population of 857 living in 333 of its 764 total private dwellings, a change of 25.8% from its 2016 population of 681. With a land area of 1,195.54 km^{2} (461.60 sq mi), it had a population density of 0.7/km^{2} (1.9/sq mi) in 2021.

In the 2016 Census of Population, the RM of Leask No. 464 recorded a population of 686 living in 254 of its 704 total private dwellings, a −11.5% change from its 2011 population of 775. With a land area of 1,257.36 km^{2} (485.47 sq mi), it had a population density of 0.5/km^{2} (1.4/sq mi) in 2016.

== Government ==
The RM of Leask No. 464 is governed by an elected municipal council and an appointed administrator that meets on the second Wednesday of every month. The reeve of the RM is Len Cantin while its administrator is Judy Douglas. The RM's office is located in Leask.

== See also ==
- List of rural municipalities in Saskatchewan
