= Muskeg Lake 102E =

Indian reserve in Saskatchewan, Canada

Coordinates: 53°00′09″N 106°57′23″W

- Indian reserve
- Muskeg Lake Indian Reserve No. 102E
- Location in Saskatchewan
- First Nation: Muskeg Lake
- Country: Canada
- Province: Saskatchewan

Area
  - Total: 162 ha (400 acres)

Population (2016)
  - Total: 0
  - Density: 0.0/km^{2} (0.0/sq mi)

Muskeg Lake 102E is an Indian reserve of the Muskeg Lake Cree Nation in Saskatchewan. It is about 49 kilometres (30 mi) south of Shellbrook. In the 2016 Canadian Census, it recorded a population of 0 living in 0 of its 0 total private dwellings.

== See also ==
- List of Indian reserves in Saskatchewan
