= Muskeg Lake 102 =

Indian reserve in Saskatchewan, Canada

Coordinates: 52°59′05″N 106°54′15″W

- Indian reserve
- Muskeg Lake Indian Reserve No. 102
- Location in Saskatchewan
- First Nation: Muskeg Lake
- Country: Canada
- Province: Saskatchewan

Area
  - Total: 7,245.4 ha (17,904 acres)

Population (2016)
  - Total: 274
  - Density: 3.78/km^{2} (9.79/sq mi)
- Community Well-Being Index: 57

Muskeg Lake 102 is an Indian reserve of the Muskeg Lake Cree Nation in Saskatchewan. It is about 113 kilometres (70 mi) north of Saskatoon. In the 2016 Canadian Census, a population of 274 living in 104 of its 112 total private dwellings was recorded. In the same year, its Community Well-Being index was calculated at 57 of 100, compared to 58.4 for the average First Nations community and 77.5 for the average non-Indigenous community.

== See also ==
- List of Indian reserves in Saskatchewan
