= Muskeg Lake 102D =

Indian reserve in Saskatchewan, Canada

Coordinates: 53°02′30″N 106°55′40″W

- Indian reserve
- Muskeg Lake Indian Reserve No. 102D
- Location in Saskatchewan
- First Nation: Muskeg Lake
- Country: Canada
- Province: Saskatchewan

Area
  - Total: 131.2 ha (324 acres)

Population (2016)
  - Total: 0
  - Density: 0.0/km^{2} (0.0/sq mi)

Muskeg Lake 102D is an Indian reserve of the Muskeg Lake Cree Nation in Saskatchewan. It is about 43 kilometres (27 mi) south-west of Shellbrook. In the 2016 Canadian Census, it recorded a population of 0 living in 0 of its 0 total private dwellings.

== See also ==
- List of Indian reserves in Saskatchewan
