= Gülistan Yüksel =

German politician

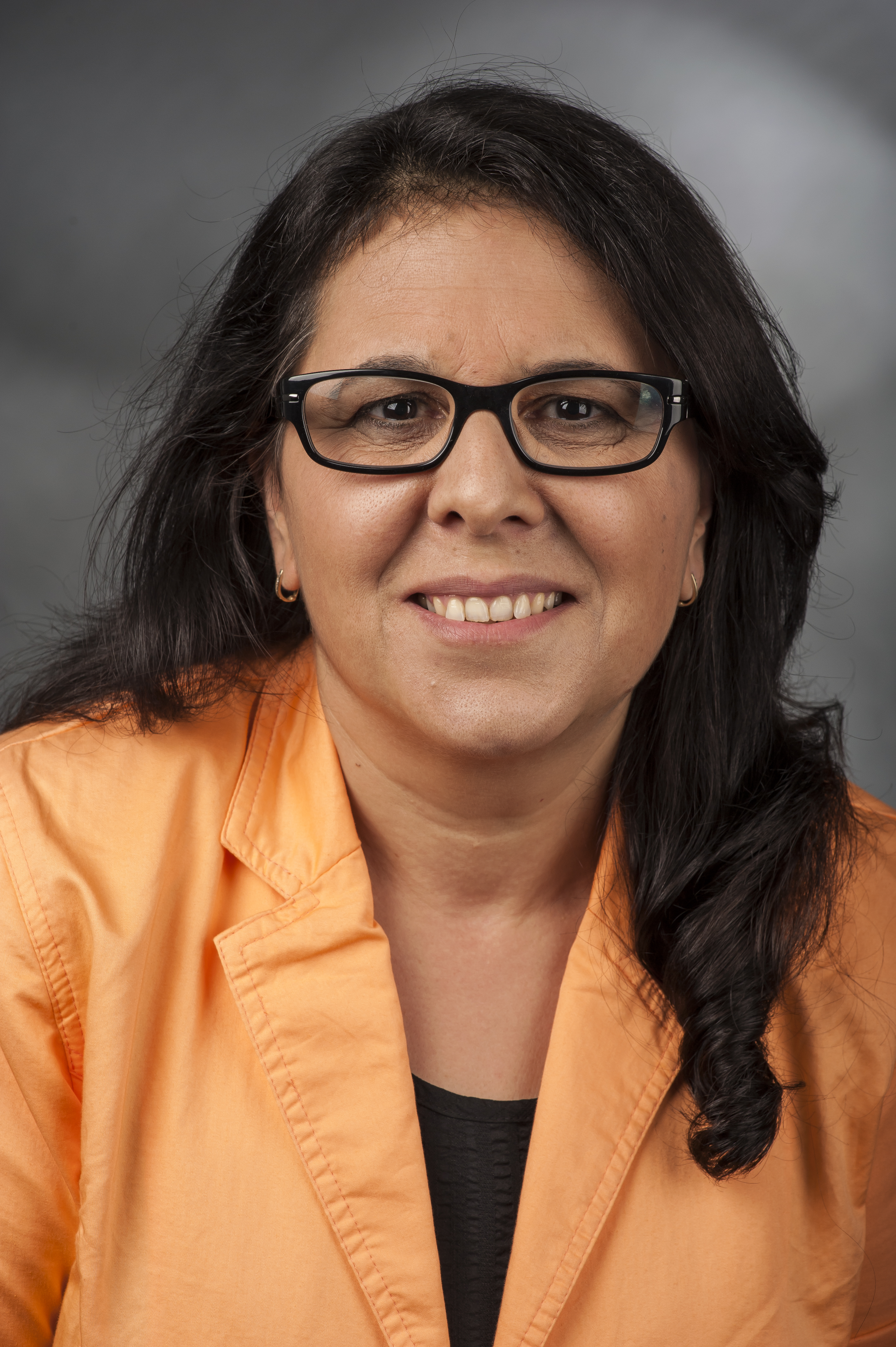
- Gülistan Yüksel in 2014

Member of the Bundestag
- In office 2013 – March 2025

Personal details
- Born: 27 March 1962 (age 64) Adana, Turkey
- Party: SPD
- Children: 2

Gülistan Yüksel (born 27 March 1962) is a German politician of the Social Democratic Party (SPD) who has been serving as a member of the Bundestag, the German parliament, from 2013 to 2025.

== Early life and professional career ==
Yüksel was born in Adana, Turkey. At the age of eight years, she moved to Mönchengladbach, Germany, and grew up in Rheydt. After vocational training as a pharmacy assistant (Pharmazeutisch-kaufmännische Angestellte), she worked in a pharmacy in Rheydt. Later, she became head of a taxi company.

== Political career ==
Yüksel became an SPD member in 1997. She was deputy chair of her local party organisation from 2005 to 2014 and chair since 2014. After serving on the Mönchengladbach city foreigner's council in the mid-1990s, she was a member of the city council for most of the time between 2002 and 2013.

Yüksel became a member of the Bundestag in the 2013 elections and was reelected in 2017 as one of 14 members of the Bundestag with Turkish roots. In addition to her committee assignments, she has been a member of the German delegation to the Franco-German Parliamentary Assembly since 2019.

Within her parliamentary group, Yüksel belongs to the Parliamentary Left, a left-wing movement.

In February 2025, Yüksel lost her seat in Bundestag.

== Recognition ==
Yüksel was awarded the Order of Merit of the Federal Republic of Germany in 2007 for her engagement for migrants.

== Other activities ==
- Federal Agency for Civic Education (BPB), Member of the Board of Trustees (since 2022)

== Personal life ==
Yüksel is married and has two children.
