= Muskeg Lake 102F =

Indian reserve in Saskatchewan, Canada

Coordinates: 53°00′28″N 106°53′10″W

- Indian reserve
- Muskeg Lake Indian Reserve No. 102F
- Location in Saskatchewan
- First Nation: Muskeg Lake
- Country: Canada
- Province: Saskatchewan

Area
  - Total: 13.9 ha (34 acres)

Population (2016)
  - Total: 20
  - Density: 140/km^{2} (370/sq mi)

Muskeg Lake 102F is an Indian reserve of the Muskeg Lake Cree Nation in Saskatchewan. It is about 41 kilometres (25 mi) south-west of Shellbrook. In the 2016 Canadian Census, it recorded a population of 20 living in 8 of its 8 total private dwellings.

== See also ==
- List of Indian reserves in Saskatchewan
