= Kathrin Henneberger =

German politician (born 1987)

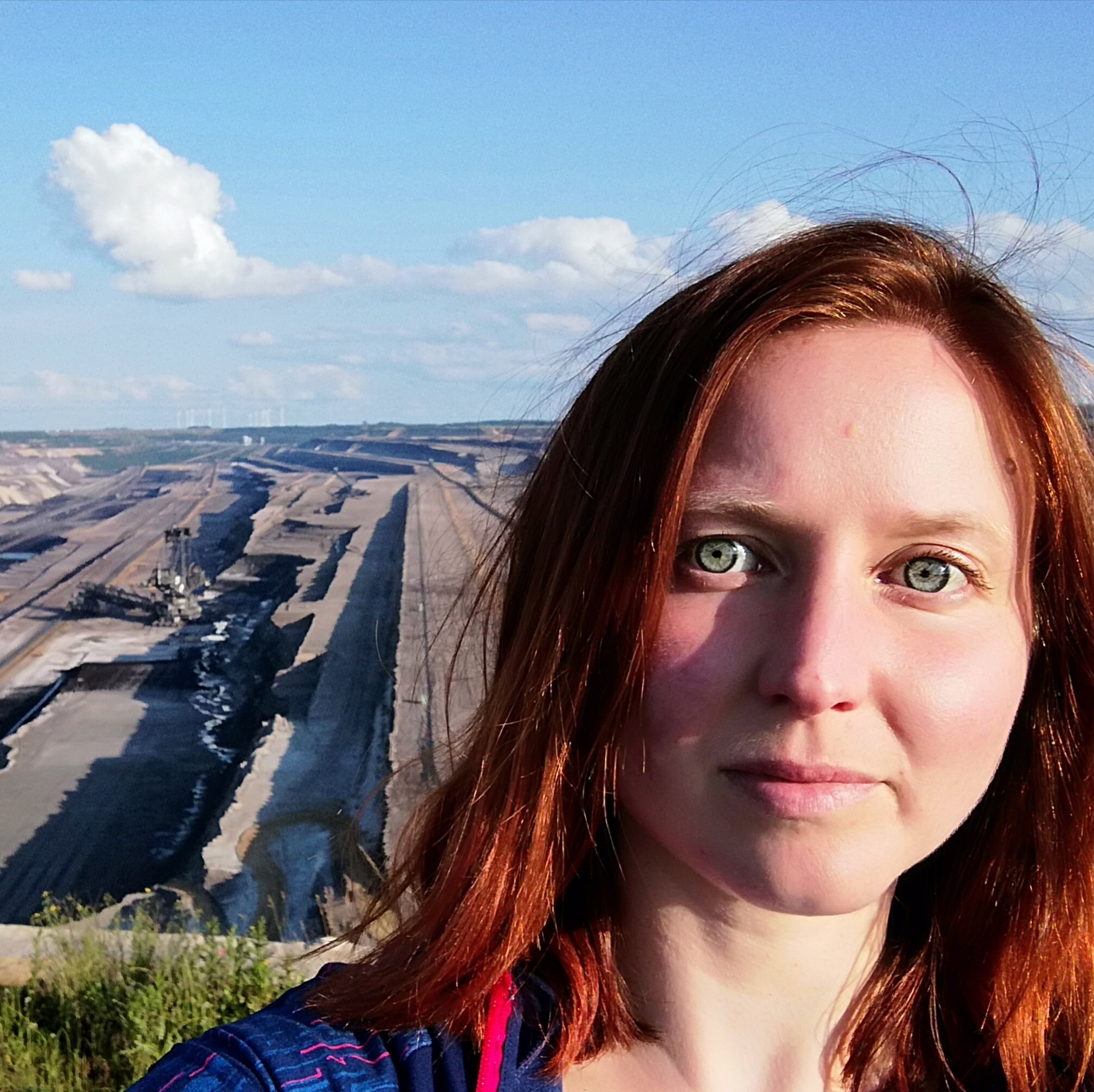
- Henneberger in 2019

Member of the Bundestag
- In office 26 October 2021 – March 2025

Personal details
- Born: 1 April 1987 (age 39) Cologne, Germany
- Party: Alliance 90/The Greens

Kathrin Henneberger (born 1 April 1987 in Cologne) is a German politician. Henneberger became a member of the Bundestag in the 2021 German federal election. She is affiliated with the Alliance 90/The Greens party.

She was spokeswoman of the Green Youth organisation (Grüne Jugend) from 2008 to 2009.

In the 2025 German federal election February 2025, Henneberger lost her seat in Bundestag.
