= Hans-Wilhelm Pesch =

German politician (1937–2026)

Member of the Bundestag
- In office 29 March 1983 – 26 October 1998

Personal details
- Born: 19 June 1937 Rheydt, Gau Düsseldorf, Germany
- Died: 1 May 2026 (aged 88)
- Party: CDU
- Occupation: Business manager

Hans-Wilhelm Pesch (19 June 1937 – 1 May 2026) was a German politician. A member of the Christian Democratic Union, he served in the Bundestag from 1983 to 1998.

Pesch died on 1 May 2026, at the age of 88.
