= Leask, Saskatchewan =

Village in Saskatchewan, Canada

Leask
- Village
- Village of Leask
- Location of Leask Leask (Canada)
- Coordinates: 53°01′13″N 106°44′30″W
- Country: Canada
- Province: Saskatchewan
- Region: Central
- Census division: 16
- Rural municipality: Leask No. 464
- Post office founded: 1912
- Incorporated (village): 1912

Government
  - Type: Municipal
  - Governing body: Leask Village Council
  - Mayor: John Priestley
  - Administrator: Brenda Lockhart

Area
  - Total: 0.75 km^{2} (0.29 sq mi)

Population (2016)
  - Total: 399
  - Density: 532.4/km^{2} (1,379/sq mi)
- Time zone: UTC-6 (CST)
- Postal code: S0J 1M0
- Area code: 306
- Highways: Highway 40 Highway 792
- Website: Village of Leask

Leask (2016 population: 399) is a village in the Canadian province of Saskatchewan within the Rural Municipality of Leask No. 464 and Census Division No. 16. This village is 80 kilometres (50 mi) southwest of Prince Albert. It is the administrative centre of the Mistawasis First Nation band government and the Rural Municipality of Leask No. 464.

== History ==
Leask incorporated as a village on September 3, 1912.

== Demographics ==
Population history (1981–2016)
Year	Pop.	±%
1981	478	—
1986	460	−3.8%
1991	442	−3.9%
1996	435	−1.6%
2001	447	+2.8%
2006	418	−6.5%
2011	413	−1.2%
2016	399	−3.4%
Source: Statistics Canada via Saskatchewan Bureau of Statistics

In the 2021 Census of Population conducted by Statistics Canada, Leask had a population of 379 living in 170 of its 197 total private dwellings, a change of −5% from its 2016 population of 399. With a land area of 0.73 km^{2} (0.28 sq mi), it had a population density of 519.2/km^{2} (1,344.7/sq mi) in 2021.

In the 2016 Census of Population, the Village of Leask recorded a population of 399 living in 184 of its 211 total private dwellings, a −3.5% change from its 2011 population of 413. With a land area of 0.75 km^{2} (0.29 sq mi), it had a population density of 532.0/km^{2} (1,377.9/sq mi) in 2016.

== See also ==
- List of communities in Saskatchewan
- List of francophone communities in Saskatchewan
- List of villages in Saskatchewan
