= Muskeg Lake Cree Nation =

Band government in Saskatchewan, Canada

- Band No. 375
- ᒪᐢᑫᑯ ᓵᑲᐦᐃᑲᐣ maskêko-sâkahikan
- People: Cree
- Treaty: Treaty 6
- Headquarters: Marcelin
- Province: Saskatchewan

Land
- Main reserve: Muskeg Lake 102
- Reserves: Asimakaniseekan Askiy 102A; Asimakaniseekan Askiy 102B; Lake Pitihkwakew 102B; Muskeg Lake 102B; Muskeg Lake 102D; Muskeg Lake 102E; Muskeg Lake 102F; Muskeg Lake 102G

Population (2023)
- On reserve: 403
- On other land: 41
- Off reserve: 2006
- Total population: 2450

Government
- Chief: Kelly Wolfe (appointed 12 February 2024 for a three-year term)

Tribal Council
- Saskatoon Tribal Council

Website
- muskeglake.com

The Muskeg Lake Cree Nation (Cree: ᒪᐢᑫᑯ ᓵᑲᐦᐃᑲᐣ, maskêko-sâkahikan) is a Cree First Nation band government in Marcelin, Saskatchewan, Canada.

The Muskeg Lake Cree Nation is affiliated with the Saskatoon Tribal Council, along with six other First Nations.

Noted people from this reserve include World War II servicewoman Mary Greyeyes, the first indigenous woman to join the Canadian Forces,, and Cheryle Chagnon-Greyeyes.

== Reserves ==
Muskeg Lake Cree Nation has reserved for itself 15 reserves:

Reserve	Location	Map	Size	Pop.	Refs.
Asimakaniseekan Askiy 102A	In the city of Saskatoon		14.3 ha		
Asimakaniseekan Askiy 102B	In the city of Saskatoon		0.2 ha		
Lake Pitihkwakew 102B	35 km northwest of Blaine Lake		1115 ha		
Muskeg Lake 102	93 km north of Saskatoon		7245.4 ha	274	
Muskeg Lake 102B	67 km northeast of North Battleford		969.6 ha	0	
Muskeg Lake 102C
Muskeg Lake 102D	43 km southwest of Shellbrook		131.2	0	
Muskeg Lake 102E	49 km south of Shellbrook		162 ha	0	
Muskeg Lake 102F	41 km southwest of Shellbrook		13.9 ha	20	
Muskeg Lake 102G	27 km north of Blaine Lake		128.8 ha	0	
Muskeg Lake 102H
Muskeg Lake 102J
Muskeg Lake 102K
Muskeg Lake 102L
Muskeg Lake 102M

== See also ==
- List of Indian reserves in Saskatchewan
