= North-West Mounted Police during the North-West Rebellion =

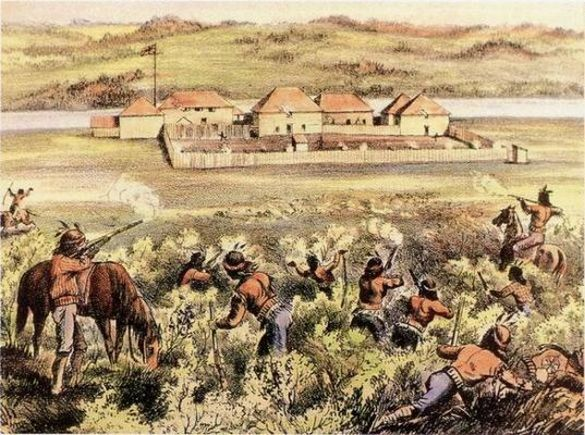
Battle of Fort Pitt

The North-West Mounted Police (NWMP) played a significant role during the North-West Rebellion in Canada in 1885. The NWMP suffered early reverses and, although they supported the relief force sent to the region under the command of Major-General Frederick Middleton, their performance was heavily criticized. Commissioner Acheson Irvine resigned from his command of the police as a result.

== Beginning of the rebellion ==
Rebellion broke out along the North Saskatchewan River valley in March 1885. The Métis rebellion led by Louis Riel was driven by political and economic issues. Riel formed a provisional government, which he hoped would be supported by Cree and others. He also hoped to defeat the NWMP and seize the Batoche region; and then force the Canadian government to negotiate. The NWMP had been concerned about Riel's presence in the Saskatchewan valley since the previous fall and had increased its presence in the area over the winter.

As tensions rose, Commissioner Acheson Irvine responded to messages from detachments in the area and mobilized the spare manpower at NWMP headquarters at Regina.

Conflict began when Riel's men took Batoche on 18 March, cutting telegraph lines and taking hostages.

== Initial police response ==
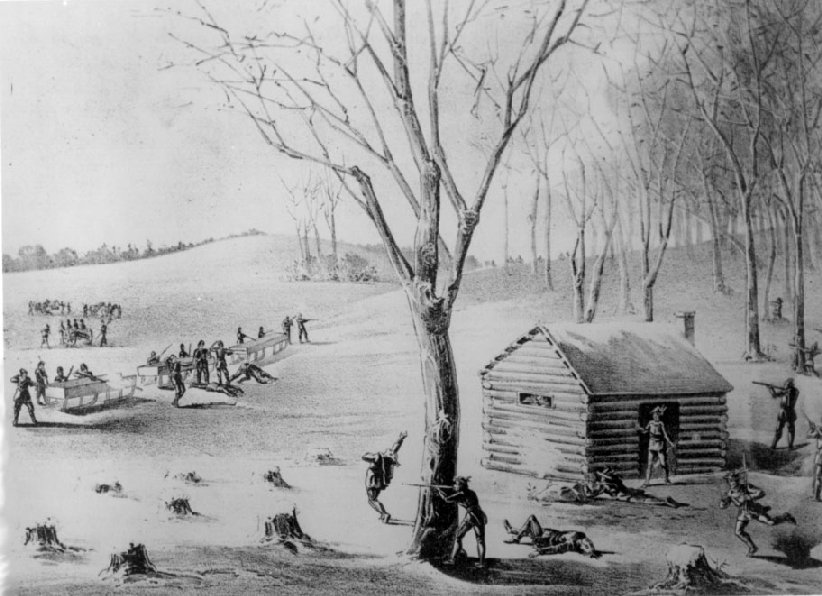
Battle of Duck Lake

Irvine marched at speed through the snow to Prince Albert, which he garrisoned with 90 police. He then set off for Fort Carlton. Superintendent Leif Crozier organized defences in Battleford, then marched with 50 police and a 7-pounder to Fort Carlton. Riel demanded the surrender of the force at Fort Carlton, which Crozier refused. The two sides first clashed when Crozier, with 55 NWMP and 43 civilian volunteers, attempting to seize a cache of supplies in the area, confronted a larger force of rebels at Duck Lake on 26 March. The government forces came off worse in the fight. After this, some Cree leaders, in particular Poundmaker and Big Bear, joined the Métis in their revolt. Others continued to tacitly support the government.

== Retreat ==
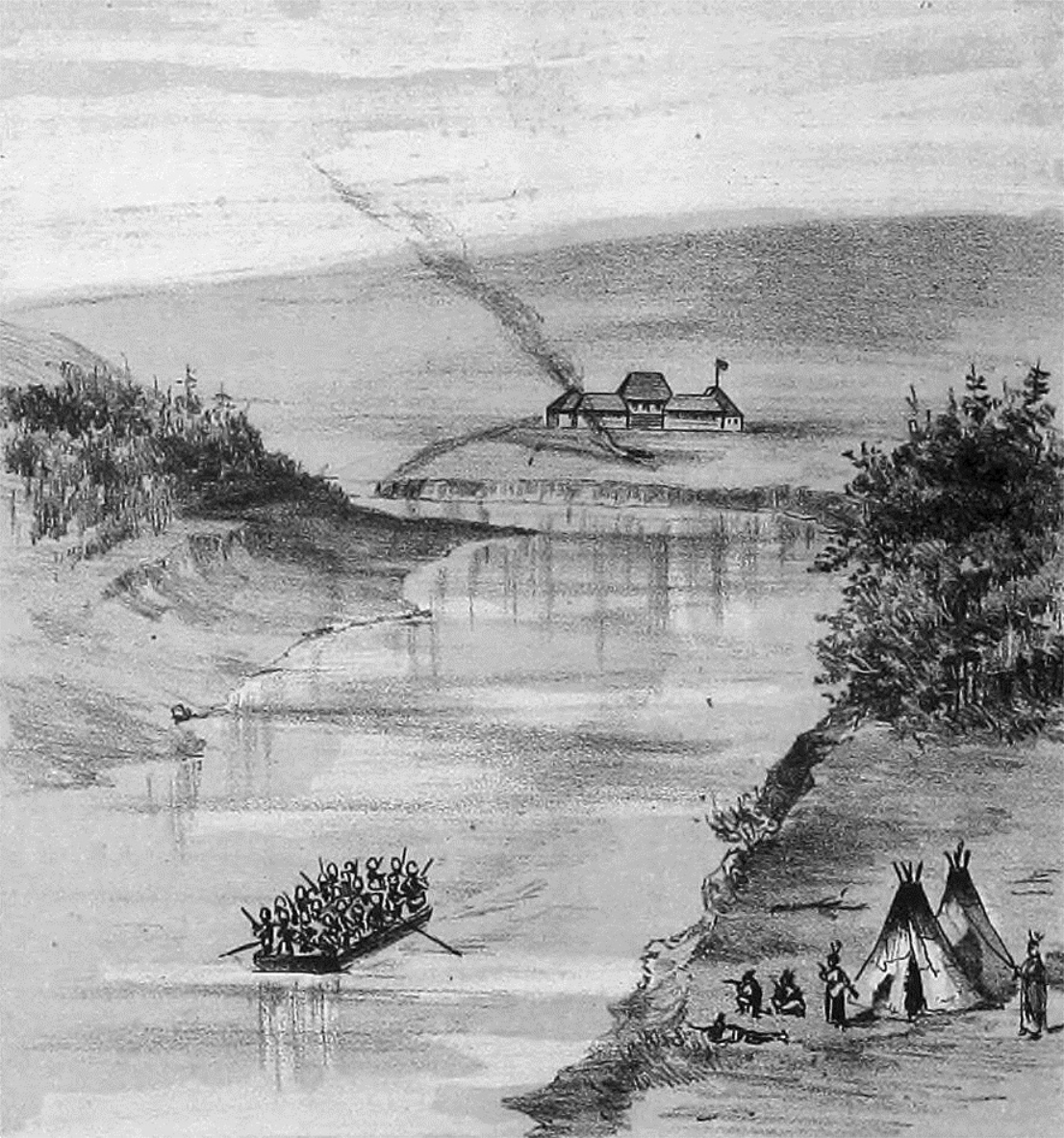
Inspector Dickens and men evacuating Fort Pitt, 1885

The NWMP numbered 562 at the start of the conflict and rapidly abandoned most of the posts along the valley. Fort Carlton appeared indefensible, and the police abandoned it on 27 March, arriving at Prince Albert the following day, where 225 police, supported by police, oversaw chaotic scenes among the many families seeking safety there. Prince Albert was effectively isolated by the rebellion. Rather than evacuating his NWMP unit and the settlers from Prince Albert, Irvine instead began to use the town as a citadel for area residents fleeing the threat of attack.

On 29 March, rebel Cree approached Battleford. In the nearby police fort, 43 NWMP under the command of Inspector William Morris watched as the town was looted. The Cree fighters placed the police fort under siege for a period.

At Fort Saskatchewan, near Edmonton, Inspector Arthur Griesbach set about improving the defences with his garrison of 20 NWMP. He encouraged the town of Edmonton to do similarly, using the old Fort Edmonton or a newer structure, as a defensive post.

Inspector Francis Dickens was commanding Fort Pitt. He had with him 25 NWMP men and limited ammunition. He swore in civilians as special constables but believed the fort to indefensible and made preparations to leave by boat. On 13 April, Big Bear with 250 Cree arrived. They intercepted a small police scouting party, killing Constable Cowan, wounding another, and capturing a third. They then demanded the surrender of Fort Pitt. After negotiations and a confrontation, the civilians surrendered, and Dickens and his men also surrendered and were allowed to leave the fort and use a makeshift boat to depart. They arrived safely at Battleford on 22 April.

== Recovery ==
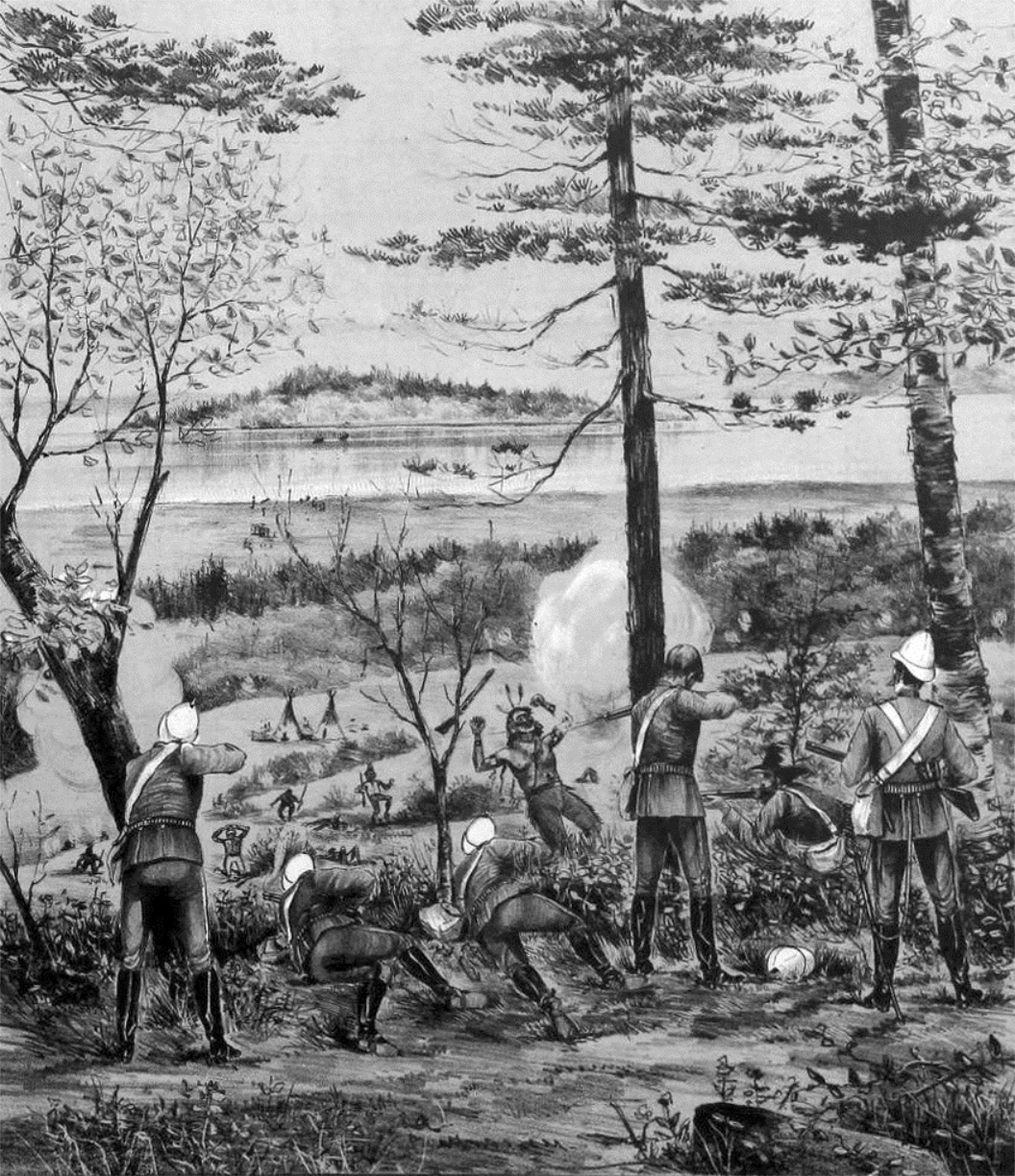
Inspector Steele and men attacking Big Bear's camp, 1885

Militia units numbering more than 5,000 strong, commanded by Major-General Frederick Middleton, hurried west along the Canadian Pacific Railway. Middleton's plan depended on three groups striking into the rebel territories, with Middleton leading the main force to retake Batoche. The second and third columns, commanded by Lieutenant Colonel W. Otter and Major-General Thomas Strange, were accompanied by 74 and 20 NWMP men respectively, the latter group armed with a 9-pounder field gun.

Otter's men reached Battleford on 1 May 1885 and marched south to Cut Knife Creek where they expected to find Poundmaker, with the NWMP forming the advance guard. Otter surprised the camp at dawn, but the attack by the advancing troops rapidly slowed. Despite the Cree having few weapons, the government forces were defeated and forced to retreat to Battleford.

After many delays, Middleton finally attacked Batoche. After three days, he defeated the settlement's defenders and captured Riel. He then formally relieved Prince Albert on 20 May.

Strange's force, containing 20 NWMP men, advanced to Edmonton, with Sam Steele of the NWMP commanding his scouts. The force then pursued Big Bear and the remnants of the rebellious Cree, along the way fighting a battle near Frenchman's Butte, until they were captured or surrendered.

The death toll among NWMP officers during the suppression of the rebellion included three at Duck Lake (Arnold, Garrett, Gibson) and three at Cut Knife Hill (Corporal Sleigh, Corporal Lowry, Trumpeter Burke).

NWMP Constable David Latimer Cowan was killed at Fort Pitt. He was in company of a boy, a nephew of John Delaney, who had been killed at Frog Lake. The boy got away on his fast horse, but insurgent members of Big Bear's band tracked him in the snow and captured him. He and a Métis companion escaped and then were picked up by troops descending the North Saskatchewan on scows from Fort Pitt to Battleford. (Judge Charles Rouleau found Louison Mongrain guilty of the killing of Constable Cowan and sentenced him to death by hanging. The sentence was later commuted. Elizabeth McLean later stated that Louison Mongrain and Manoonmin, "a friendly Indian from Riding Mountain", had stood guard over her and her father, formerly chief factor at Fort Pitt, in the days after the Battle of Loon Lake and protected her and her father from potential attackers.

== Aftermath ==
Big Bear voluntarily surrendered to the NWMP post at Fort Carlton. He had seen the troops sent to Green Lake to search for him but had eluded them, then had made his way to Fort Carlton, where upon discovery he give himself up voluntarily to NWMP Sergeant Smart. He claimed that he had been unwilling to surrender to troops as Gen. Strange's soldiers had not respected a white flag when they had met earlier.

The NWMP held Riel in prison at Regina. He was given a trial and found guilty, and hanged at the North-West Mounted Police barracks in Regina.

General Middleton criticized Irvine and the NWMP for having remained in Prince Albert throughout the campaign and for failing to join his forces during the Battle of Batoche. The major-general likened the NWMP to "gophers", who retreated and hid during fighting. His complaints were picked up by the press. Irvine criticized Crozier for "the impetuosity displayed by both the police and volunteers" at Duck Lake and, when the details became public, Crozier resigned. Irvine defended his defensive stance at Prince Albert, but the press criticized him for his lack of "vigour". Finding himself without support from Prime Minister Macdonald, Crozier resigned the next year.

Early historians defended the performance of the NWMP, noting that the force was mostly under the command of the militia and General Middleton himself, and were not given opportunities to show their value in battle.

Later historians have been more critical. R. C. Macleod, for example, noted that Irvine's failure to reinforce Middleton "can only be explained by excessive caution...or by his ignorance of what was happening on his doorstep". Stanley Horrall blamed the police's poor performance on a combination of government neglect and weak leadership shown by Commissioner Irvine in the years running up to the rebellion. Nonetheless, historians consider the NWMP's good relationships with the local First Nations valuable during the campaign.

== Bibliography ==
- Atkin, Ronald (1973). Maintain the Right: The Early History of the North West Mounted Police, 1873-1900. London, UK and Basingstoke, UK: Macmillan. ISBN 9780333122822.
- Horrall, Stanley W. (1973). The Pictorial History of the Royal Canadian Mounted Police. Toronto, Canada: McGraw-Hill Ryerson. ISBN 9780070773660.
- Macleod, R. C. (1976). The North-West Mounted Police and Law Enforcement, 1873-1905. Toronto, Canada and Buffalo, US: University of Toronto Press. ISBN 0802053335.
- Morrison, William Robert (1985). Showing the Flag: The Mounted Police and Canadian Sovereignty in the North, 1894–1925. Vancouver, Canada: University of British Columbia Press. ISBN 978-0-7748-0245-1.
