= Exovedate =

Council formed by Louis Riel during the 1885 North-West Rebellion

Exovedate is the name coined by Métis leader Louis Riel and given by him to his council of the Provisional Government of Saskatchewan during the North-West Rebellion in Canada. Ten years prior to this date on December 8, 1875 after attending a mass in Washington, D. C., Riel had a religious vision where God spoke to him in Latin. Riel believed that God had chosen him to be the divine leader of the Métis and that he had been given the mission to lead them to their promised land similar to how God had chosen Moses to lead the Jews. From this point onward Louis took the middle name "David" and called himself "the prophet of the new world."

== Background ==
In order to facilitate Riel's political and religious ambitions he formed the Exovedate in March 1885. Individual council members were called Exovedes. The term is a neologism invented by Riel, derived from the Latin ex "out of" and ovis "sheep", meaning "chosen from the flock". The Exovedate was composed of twenty men, including Gabriel Dumont and Honoré Jackson. The majority of the Exovedate were Métis; however, it also included two French Canadians, the Sioux chief White Cap, and Jackson, who was a white English-speaking Methodist and first to be baptized into Riel's new religion.

The Exovedate's ultimate goal was for the betterment of the Métis who continued to suffer increasing marginalization and poverty in spite of the success that Riel had accomplished in founding the province of Manitoba in 1870. It was also a means by which Riel could proselytize for his new religion; however, it is not known to what extent the Exovedate understood or were indoctrinated into Riel's increasingly esoteric beliefs. They did however declare Riel "a prophet in the service of Jesus Christ and Son of God and only Redeemer of the world...".

The final meeting of the Exovedate prior to the defeat of the Métis in the North-West Rebellion was on March 31, 1885.

== See also ==
- The Canadian Crown and Aboriginal peoples
- Métis Population Betterment Act
- Prince Albert Volunteers
- Bell of Batoche
- Battle of Cut Knife
- Battle of Duck Lake
- Battle of Fish Creek
- Battle of Fort Pitt
- Battle of Frenchman's Butte
- Frog Lake Massacre
- Battle of Loon Lake
- Looting of Battleford
