= Battle of Fort Pitt =

1885 battle of the North-West Rebellion

Coordinates: 53.65018°N 109.75154°W

- Part of the North-West Rebellion
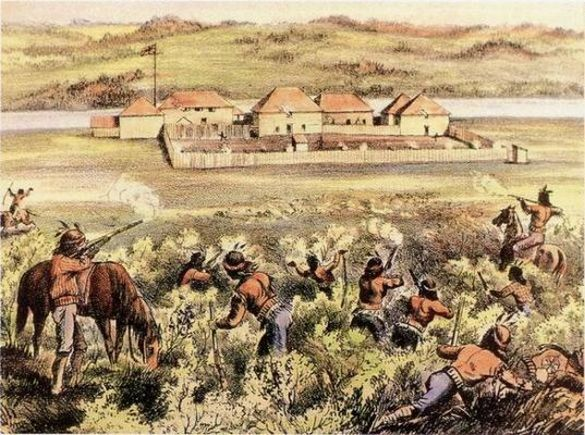
- Contemporary illustration from The Illustrated London News depicting the events of April 15, 1885
Date	April 15, 1885
Location	Frenchman Butte No. 501, near Frenchman Butte, Saskatchewan, Canada
Result	Cree capture of Fort Pitt

Belligerents
Cree	Canada

Commanders and leaders
Big Bear	Francis Dickens

Strength
200–250	22 North-West Mounted Police

Casualties and losses
0–4 killed	1 killed, 1 wounded

The District of Saskatchewan in 1885

The Battle of Fort Pitt was an engagement during the North-West Rebellion in which Cree forces under the leadership of Big Bear captured Fort Pitt from a detachment of Canada's North-West Mounted Police on April 15, 1885.

The event occurred during a broader period of conflict in the North-West Territories involving Cree and Métis groups and Canadian government forces in 1885. This period included a number of confrontations at isolated settlements and posts, although the Battle of Fort Pitt itself centred on the surrender and capture of the fort rather than a direct assault on nearby settlements.

== Background ==
In the Canadian North-West Territories, tensions had been building for several years prior to 1885 due to the collapse of the bison economy , delayed treaty obligations, and dissatisfaction with federal administration of Indigenous affairs. Historians note that these pressures contributed to growing unrest among both Métis and Cree communities in what is now Saskatchewan and Alberta.

While the Métis under Louis Riel established a provisional government at Batoche in March 1885, Cree leader Big Bear did not initially join the armed resistance and sought to avoid direct conflict with Canadian authorities. Instead, he continued efforts to negotiate improved treaty terms and greater autonomy for Cree communities.

Tensions escalated following the Métis victory over government forces at the Battle of Duck Lake on March 26. This engagement contributed to heightened anxiety and instability across the region. In early April, violence broke out at Frog Lake on April 2, where nine unarmed officials and settlers were killed by members of a Cree faction led by Wandering Spirit. Big Bear was not present at Frog Lake and did not authorize the killings, although he was subsequently drawn into the wider conflict as Canadian forces responded.

Following Frog Lake, unrest spread in parts of central and northern present-day Alberta and Saskatchewan, including raids on several isolated posts and settlements such as Lac La Biche, Saddle Lake, and Green Lake. Historians emphasize that these actions were not centrally coordinated and varied in scope and motivation among different Cree and Métis participants.

In response to the outbreak of violence, the Canadian government mobilized military columns, including the Alberta Field Force under Major-General Thomas Bland Strange, and other North-West Field Force units, and formal militia units in Central Canada. These forces deployed to suppress the uprising and restore government control in the region. The troops and Cree fighters fought in several actions, including the Battle of Frenchman's Butte.

== Battle ==
On April 15, 1885, Cree fighters arrived at Fort Pitt. They intercepted a North-West Mounted Police scouting party, killing one constable, wounding another, and capturing a third. (Later a man thought to be Cowan's killer was himself killed by a militia patrol. On May 25, a militia patrol at Fort Pitt encountered a man named Ma-ma-nook, a resident of Saddle Lake who was well known in Edmonton, wearing Cowan's tunic and carrying his rifle. The patrol killed him when he did not stop at their command.)

The commander of the garrison at Fort Pitt, Francis Dickens (son of novelist Charles Dickens, concluded that the First Nations attackers outnumbered his force. He entered negotiations with them. Big Bear agreed to release the captured police officers and allow the garrison to depart.

Dickens and the remaining North-West Mounted Police subsequently withdrew and reached Battleford after a six-day march. His decision not to defend the post was later criticized in contemporary and historical accounts, although historians note the limited defensive capacity of the detachment.

Big Bear detained the civilian inhabitants of Fort Pitt and destroyed the fort.

== Aftermath ==
After their capture of Fort Pitt, the band of Big Bear withdrew from the fort and took the civilians with them as captives or hostages. The captives were not held at a fixed location but moved with the band during its withdrawal through present-day Saskatchewan.

During the following weeks, the group evaded pursuing Canadian forces. Some captives were released or escaped individually during this period, while others remained with the band. Historical accounts generally indicate that the captives were not systematically harmed, although conditions varied during their captivity.

By late May and early June, strong military pressure on Big Bear’s band caused its dispersal. Many captives were released or abandoned during this final phase, including in the period surrounding the engagement at Loon Lake (Steele Narrows) on June 3. The captives were recovered by Canadian authorities.

The wider North-West Rebellion had finished in May with the government force's capture of Batoche. By summer, remaining Indigenous leaders surrendered as well, including Big Bear on July 2.

Criticism of Inspector Francis Dickens persisted after the event, due to his withdrawal from Fort Pitt rather than attempting to defend it. Other accounts emphasize the limited capacity of the North-West Mounted Police detachment there.

== Legacy ==
In the spring of 2008, Tourism, Parks, Culture and Sport Minister Christine Tell proclaimed in Duck lake, that "the 125th commemoration, in 2010, of the 1885 Northwest Resistance is an excellent opportunity to tell the story of the prairie Métis and First Nations peoples' struggle with Government forces and how it has shaped Canada today." Fort Pitt, the scene of the Battle of Fort Pitt, is a Provincial Park and National Historic site where a National Historic Sites and Monuments plaque designates where Treaty 6 was signed.

== See also ==
- List of battles won by Indigenous peoples of the Americas
