= Fort Pitt Provincial Park =

Historic trading outpost and provincial park in Saskatchewan, Canada

Fort Pitt
- waskahikansis (Cree) 'little fort'; Itakapioxis (Blackfoot) 'circle of houses'
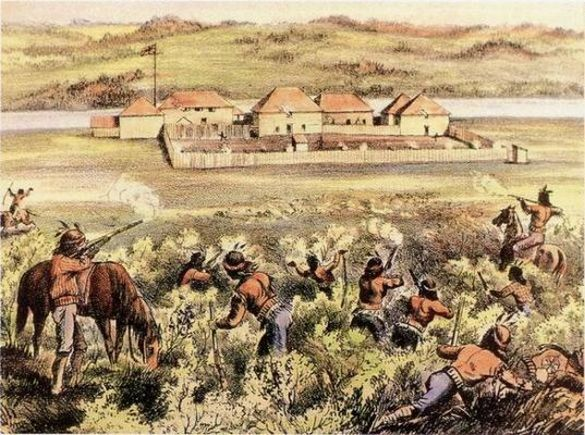
- Battle of Fort Pitt

- Location within Saskatchewan Location within Canada
- 53.571°N 109.792°W
- Location: Frenchman Butte, Saskatchewan, Canada

History
- Built: 1829
- Original use: Trading post
- Demolished: 1885
- Rebuilt: 1886 (partial)

National Historic Site of Canada
- Official name: Fort Pitt National Historic Site of Canada
- Designated: 7 June 1956

Fort Pitt Provincial Park is a provincial park in the Canadian province of Saskatchewan. It includes the site of Fort Pitt, a trading post built in 1829 by the Hudson's Bay Company (HBC) on the North Saskatchewan River in Rupert's Land. It was built at the direction of Chief Factor John Rowand, previously of Fort Edmonton, to trade goods for bison hides, meat and pemmican. Pemmican, dried buffalo meat, was required as provisions for HBC's northern trading posts.

In the 1870s the buffalo in the Fort Pitt area had been severely diminished through the overhunting necessary to meet the high demand from the HBC for pemmican. One academic journal states "with the disappearance of the buffalo, pork had replaced pemmican altogether", showing the drastic effects on the HBC of the depletion of the local buffalo population.

Fort Pitt was built where the territories of the Cree, Assiniboine, and Blackfoot converged. It was located on a large bend in the river just east of the present day Alberta–Saskatchewan border and was the major post between Fort Edmonton and Fort Carlton. In 1876, it was one of the locations for signing Treaty 6. It was the scene of the Battle of Fort Pitt during the North-West Rebellion of 1885. The site was designated a national historic site of Canada in 1954.

In 1986, approximately 10.4 ha (26 acres) of land surrounding the remains of the fort was designated as Fort Pitt Provincial Park by the government of Saskatchewan.

== History of Fort Pitt ==
Fort Pitt (1829–1890) was a prairie trading post of the HBC on the North Saskatchewan River about 16 kilometres (9.9 mi) east of the present-day Alberta border. It was on the north bank of the river on a flat above a bluff. It traded mainly in pemmican and buffalo robes with the Blackfoot, Cree, and some Métis. There was a fair amount of agriculture and horse-rearing. It was named after Thomas Pitt, a member of the HBC governing board from 1810 to 1832.

=== Bison and the establishment of Fort Pitt ===
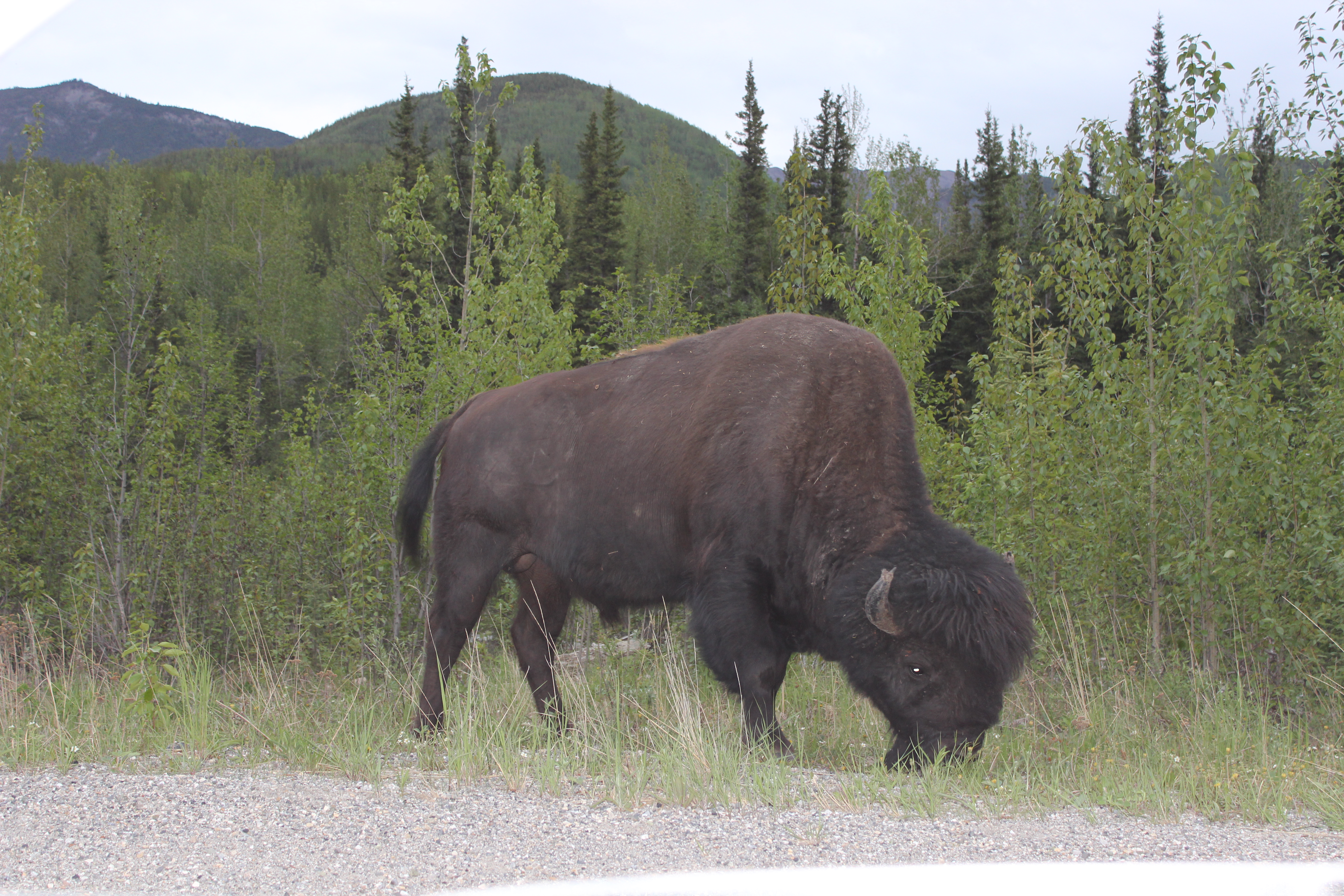
Bison

In 1690, Henry Kelsey from the HBC became the first European to walk the prairies of Rupert's Land and see the abundance of bison. For thousands of years dating back to the Western Archaic and the Avonlea Periods, First Nations have stalked, hunted, and followed the migration of bison along the prairies. Prior to European contact with North America, the bison was the most numerous of all grazing animals. Estimates of their numbers are only speculative, but may have ranged from 30,000,000 to 75,000,000. By the beginning of the nineteenth century, the production of pemmican on the plains had become an industrial-scale operation. For many years, prairie bison also provided pelts, hides, and other food. In the early 1800s, various fur-trading companies began strategically placing numerous trading posts on the maze of northern waterways. The Saskatchewan River provided access to the south-western area of Rupert's Land and to the Sturgeon-Weir River, which led to the Churchill River. These vast water highways spanned the future province from east to west. In 1830, Fort Pitt was established on the North Saskatchewan River by the HBC in what was at its time known as the heart of buffalo country. The fort was built by Chief Factor John Rowand to meet the provisions necessary for the HBC, such as buffalo meat, hides, and pemmican.

Fort Pitt was established in September 1829 by HBC company clerk Patrick Small, the son of North West Company (NWC) partner Patrick Small, the brother-in-law of David Thompson and John MacDonald and the son-in-law of David Hughes. During the first winter Small and his men lived in tents, and building was not completed until spring 1831. It was closed in 1832 for fear of attack by surrounding Cree and Blackfoot, though it reopened in fall 1833.

In 1843, John Rowand, the son of John Rowand of Fort Edmonton, became master. In 1854, the elder Rowand, on his way to retirement, visited his son. While breaking up a fight between two voyageurs, he had a heart attack and died.

Artist Paul Kane visited Fort Pitt in 1848.

==== Depletion of bison ====
In 1873, the bison market came to an abrupt end when Fort Pitt, once one of the most reliable sources of provisions in the Saskatchewan District, all but collapsed. The demands of numerous HBC and NWC trading companies along Saskatchewan waterways in the 1800s significantly depleted the once well established bison population. With completion of the US Union Pacific Railroad in 1869, between 1868 and 1881 an estimated 31,000,000 bison were killed, mostly as a result of trade in bison hide and sport hunting in the United States. Despite every exertion being made by the officer in charge of the post, who sent staff to follow up and traffic wherever Natives or buffalo could be found, parties returned empty handed from the South Branch territories. After the bison were gone, almost five-sixths of the provisions brought to the post arrived via independent parties who travelled long distances. Purchases of these crucial resources soon became "a heavy expense" on the post. Meanwhile, the rest of the upper Saskatchewan posts were satisfying the needs of HBC posts.

===== Impact on Indigenous peoples =====
The economic and social impact the depletion of bison left on Indigenous tribes was devastating.

After the disappearance of bison in the lands surrounding Fort Pitt, Indigenous peoples attempted agriculture to provide food for their families. Their initial farming attempts failed because when choosing reserve land, chiefs had shown a decided preference for rolling, heavily wooded terrain that was better suited for traditional pursuits such as hunting and gathering than raising crops. Government authorities attributed this sorry outcome to "Indian idleness" rather than environmental circumstances. The agricultural aid promised in treaties such as implements, animals, and seeds was also slow in coming and inadequate. The government of Canada expected the Indian adoption of agriculture to be an overnight success on the Indian reserves and was more concerned with saving money than providing necessary assistance. As the trade and resources dwindled surrounding Fort Pitt, the federal government came to resent its existing treaty obligations. In particular, they came to resent the cost of feeding starving Indians and balked at assuming additional duties. Many even questioned why money should be spent on keeping a dying race alive. Canadian government officials adopted a "submit or starve" technique in an attempt to force Indigenous people into forfeiting rights, signing treaties, and moving onto reserves. Big Bear resisted signing the treaty, then moved his band onto a reserve near Fort Pitt.

=== Smallpox ===
The emergence of smallpox had devastating consequences on Fort Pitt and the surrounding area. The plague of illness further taxed the already diminished recourses at Fort Pitt. The depletion of the buffalo, a fundamental food source, paired with lack of knowledge surrounding the smallpox virus directly correlated to the 100 Cree lives lost in 1869-1870. The 100 dead Cree was the second-highest death toll due to smallpox of any recorded Cree population during this time. While these are recorded numbers some estimates are provided that the smallpox virus may have claimed the lives of half of all Cree. Some sources estimate upwards of 10,000 deaths were caused by the virus. "More than 100 infected Cree, forbidden from entering the fort, died outside the stockade. The dead laid [sic] for days until hungry wolves came from the forest and fought over the rotting bodies. Some sick Natives thought that if they could give the sickness back to the Canadians at Fort Pitt – where it had come from – they could stop the suffering themselves. So they hung around the fort, put their scarred faces against the pump handles and spat on the door knobs."

While smallpox had devastating effects on the population surrounding Fort Pitt its effects failed to penetrate the walls of the fort to any great extent. The Journal of the American Medical Association states that as few as three people were infected inside the fort itself. The author of the article said "I can only attribute this to the fact that Mr. John Sinclair had taken precaution early in the previous summer to vaccinate all of the persons residing there."

Fort Pitt provided hope to the many infected making the journey to seek aid at the fort. Many Cree set up temporary settlements in the surrounding area in hopes that the fort would be able to provide aid to the ill. The large congregation of Cree surrounding Fort Pitt may have been one of the reasons that accounts of death due to smallpox were so high in the surrounding areas.

=== Tension with the Blackfoot ===
As the relationship between Fort Pitt and the Cree began to grow, so did the tension between the Members of Fort Pitt and the Blackfoot. The Blackfoot's deemed any allies of the Cree to be enemies of the Blackfoot and thus open to exploitation and attack.

"The Blackfoot considered the Hudson's Bay Company to be in league with the Cree, so their relationship with the traders became tenuous. In 1863 the Blackfoot began to raid Fort Pitt itself." The fact that "Many Crees had intermarried with Hudson's Bay Company employees and were so friendly with them that the Blackfoot began to see the traders as their enemies as well."

Increased trading with the Woods and Plains Cree created fear amongst the HBC traders at Fort Pitt. The HBC worried that trading with the Cree would open the Cree as well as Fort Pitt itself up to raids by the Blackfoot. "The arrival of the Cree caused fear at the post that they would attract Blackfoot raiders and a possible attack on the post. Fort Pitt at the time was understaffed, both staff and the local Métis being away hunting on the plains or with the boat brigade." Blackfoot fighters made many attempts to intercept trading parties en route to the fort, as well as attempting raids on the fort itself.

=== Big Bear ===
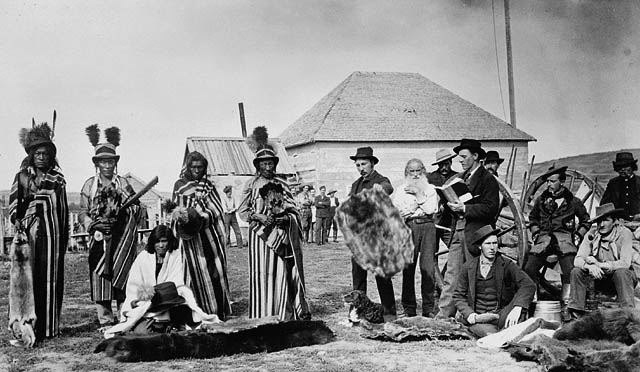
Big Bear at Fort Pitt

Big Bear's presence and position within the Plains Cree was a defining factor in the relationship that Fort Pitt shared with the Cree nation. Big Bear was often described as an advocate for the peaceful negotiations between the Indigenous populations and the European settlers. Big Bear's presence in the area would have helped facilitate a less hostile environment, and would have been a significant factor in how the Plains Cree acted during the rebellion of 1885. "Despite their impoverished state and stinging sense of disillusionment and betrayal, Indians had made a solemn vow during the treaty negotiations to live in peace and were not prepared to break this pledge and plunge the region into war. Instead Big Bear and other senior Cree chiefs patiently sought a peaceful resolution to their grievances."

Fighters of Big Bear's band forced the surrender of Fort Pitt, letting the NWMP detachment there safely leave. After a second raid on the fort a couple weeks later, they burned down much of the fort.

The compassion that Big Bear showed for the value of human life was shown by his people's treatment of the HBC staff at Fort Pitt after the Cree takeover in 1885. "The absorption of the people of Fort Pitt into the camp, and of other people gathered from the surrounding countryside suggest that Big Bear and the other Woods Cree leaders saw this as essential in order to protect those whose lives might be in danger. Their goal was to keep them out of harm's way, not do harm to them. The great number of 'captives' or 'prisoners' had opted for the protection of the Cree camp upon the advice of aboriginal friends or leaders. This was difficult for the general non-Aboriginal public to comprehend." Many Fort Pitt inhabitants were so comfortable with the relationship between them and the Cree they would walk uncontested into the Cree camps even after the hostilities that took place at the fort.

Big Bear and 14 band members stood trial in Regina for their participation in the events of 1885 including the capturing of Fort Pitt. Even though Big Bear did not participate in the violence and spoke out against it, he was charged with treason, for not abandoning his band at the onset of the violence. He was ultimately convicted of treason and served three years at the Stony Mountain Penitentiary.

=== Chief Sweet Grass ===
Even though Big Bear was a powerful and recognized leader within the Crees and Saskatchewan area, Chief Sweet Grass played a large role in the securing of Treaty 6, as well as a leading role in dealing with the government. Due to Big Bear's predisposed bad reputation with McDougall, Alexander Morris had arrived to begin negotiations with a predetermined favouritism towards Chief Sweet Grass. Despite Chief Sweet Grass's holding only 25 lodges compared to Big Bear's 65, Sweet Grass was still seen as desirable because of the government belief in his ability to sway his fellow council members into signing. To try to secure his people's safety and well-being moving forward with the treaty, Chief Sweet Grass addressed the governors present as such:

"When I hold your hand and touch your heart, let us be as one; use your utmost to help me and help my children so that they may prosper. It is for that reason I give you my hand."

Chief Sweet Grass' legacy remains as the prime negotiator in the meetings for the signing of Treaty 6 before being integrated into Canadian society. Sweet Grass converted to Christianity in 1870, being baptized into Catholicism with the name Abraham. He later was shot dead by his brother, using the pistol given to him for signing the treaty. The Sweet Grass Reserve is established in Battleford, Saskatchewan.

=== Treaty 6 ===
Before the introduction of Treaty 6 into land stretching into what is now Saskatchewan and Alberta, several numbered treaties had appeared as the Canadian government pushed west to open the land for settlers. Due to a lack of provincial boundaries set in place before several of the numbered treaties existing, there is an overlap in treaty / provincial lines. As situations got worse in Manitoba for the Métis and other Indigenous populations, they headed further west to salvage what they could of the diminishing buffalo population. In turn, as they settled in the District of Saskatchewan, it put even greater pressure on the population there. Therefore, this left the Indigenous people of Fort Pitt, and other surrounding areas, no other options other than to seek an agreement with the Canadian government in the form of a treaty to protect their interests. The main inhabitants of the land at the time consisted of Cree, with some Assiniboine, Saulteaux, and Chipewyan, although the main intention of the treaty was focused on the Cree people.

Treaty 6 was noted as one of the only treaties in which provisions such as medical treatment as well as relief in case of national disease or famine. Despite Chief Big Bear's resentment towards the signing of the treaty, due to his belief that it was unfair towards its people, it went on to be signed without him. The negotiations began on 5 September 1876. In exchange for their land, they were given horses, wagons, farming equipment, as well as the promise of aid mentioned above. During the initial negotiations, Morris and company had declared that the people of Fort Pitt will be given the same treaty terms presented at Fort Carlton. After Morris was given permission to establish the terms of the treaty to the Indigenous council, they met in council to debate and discuss the rest of the day. Days after initial negotiations had begun, the commissioners arrived to gather the final decision. Cree Chief Sweet Grass came forward from the council to accept the terms given to them by the government, but also a plea to keep the Indigenous population alive and prosperous, stating "When I hold your hand and touch your heart, let us be as one; use your utmost to help me and help my children so that they may prosper." The treaty had consisted of annual cash payments to chiefs and their band members, ranging from $5 to $25, reserve lands, schools on the reserves, as well as farming equipment and tools such as wagons, horses, livestock, twine, and ammunition.

=== Wandering Spirit ===
Wandering Spirit was a war chief in the Plains Cree under the leadership of Big Bear. Wandering Spirit's personality and ideals varied from Big Bear in many ways. He engaged in violence instead of the peaceful negotiations preferred by Big Bear. Wandering Spirit "initiated the killing of nine White and half-breed men on 2 April at Frog Lake." This act of defiance against Big Bear and his peaceful negotiations was a turning point in the Plains Cree's history. The war chiefs soon took control of the Plains Cree "ending Big Bear's peaceful ten-year struggle to obtain better conditions for his people." One of Wandering Spirit's first movements after the Frog Lake Massacre was to proceed south-east to the HBC trading post at Fort Pitt, where Wandering Spirit demanded the post be surrendered by the North-West Mounted Police (NWMP) guarding it. In return for a peaceful surrender the NWMP were allowed to leave unharmed. Wandering Spirit gave the HBC employees and their families the choice of leaving with the police or surrendering to him and the Cree with him. All of the HBC employees chose to surrender instead of joining the police in leaving Fort Pitt. Wandering Spirit ordered his men to raid the fort, filling wagons full of food, clothes and supplies. His group then returned to Frog Lake with 44 hostages from Fort Pitt. Most of the hostages were placed under the control of the Woods Cree at Frog Lake.

In May 1885, Fort Pitt was again visited by Wandering Spirit and Big Bear's Cree. By this time, the Cree Camp had grown to an estimated 300 men and 700 women and children, as well as containing hostages, dogs, and horses. The Cree again took things from the fort, this time departing to Frenchman Butte. When they left, the Cree set fire to many of the buildings at Fort Pitt.

While Wandering Spirit showed more aggression than Big Bear, he still sometimes tried to avoid violence. He gave the option of surrender and departure to the NWMP at Fort Pitt which showed that while he was not opposed to violence, it was not his desired outcome. Some debate if the release of the NWMP was Wandering Spirit's idea or due to the intervention of Big Bear.

Wandering Spirit was not opposed to the presence of the HBC in the North-West Territories; however, he opposed the government. The police force at Fort Pitt was his target in May 1885, not the many traders and their families who worked for the HBC. Hostilities were never expressed towards the traders or their families, and they were welcomed into the Cree camps.

Wandering Spirit eventually surrendered with other Cree at Fort Pitt. They were charged for the crimes and murders they committed in 1885.

=== Francis Jeffery Dickens ===
In 1883, 25 NWMP were sent to Fort Pitt under the command of Francis Dickens, the son of the novelist Charles Dickens. Dickens arrived "Several days late and was met by a large camp of Indians, many of them dissatisfied because they had not received their promised agriculture equipment." At this time, Fort Pitt was seeing an increase in the number of dissatisfied Plains Cree in the area. The lack of resources and growing tensions throughout the prairies helped cause the 1885 rebellion. After fighting broke out at Duck Lake, John Rae requested that Dickens track and try to ensure that Big Bear's Cree remain in the Fort Pitt area. There was a growing fear that an increasing number of Cree would join the Métis and pose an even greater threat.

After surrendering Fort Pitt in April 1885, Dickens and his men retreated to the safety of Battleford, effectively ending Dickens' active duty with the NWMP. Dickens was employed as a justice of the peace and presided over some of the preliminary hearings of the rebels. In 1886, he left the employment of government and moved to the United States with the intentions of completing a lecture tour. Dickens died on 11 June of a suspected heart attack before the tour began.

=== W.J. McLean – Fort Pitt supervisor during uprising ===
W.J. McLean was a chief trader who was responsible for the supervision of Fort Pitt beginning in 1884. He had previously served twenty years with the company at various locations. His wife Helen was born at Fort Dunvegan and was partly of aboriginal ancestry. There were eight McLean children, and in the spring of 1885 Helen McLean was expecting another child. The three eldest McLean sisters, Amelia, Eliza, and Kitty, were all well educated, having attended school at Red River, but they could also ride, shoot, and were fluent in Cree and Saulteaux. Following the Massacre at Frog Lake, Fort Pitt's population dramatically increased as people from surrounding districts sought protection there, some with the assistance of Aboriginal associates. There were 23 NWMP stationed at the fort under the command of Francis Dickens. These included many police members who were evacuated from Frog Lake. On 14 April, when Big Bear and his Plains Cree party assembled on the banks overlooking the fort, they specifically asked to speak to McLean, who was on friendly terms with these people and believed that he did not have to fear for himself or his family. Lengthy discussions lasted two days; however, violence broke out when the Cree thought themselves to be under attack. In statements made later, McLean never hesitated to lay the blame for this on the poor judgment of Inspector Dickens, who, the day before, sent out two NWMP and one civilian to gather information on the whereabouts of Aboriginal groups. Their sudden appearance led the Cree to believe that they were under attack. Three Crees were killed during the confrontation along with one of the NWMP members. During this event, all the inhabitants of Fort Pitt except the remaining NWMP, agreed to evacuate the fort, and become part of Big Bear's camp.

=== North-West Rebellion ===
Unease surrounded the European settlers and the Indigenous population during the mid-1880s. Fort Pitt was no exception. However, the relationship between the European settlers and the local Cree were different than relations between the two groups in other areas at that time. Violence occurred in the areas surrounding Fort Pitt, but not necessarily within the fort itself. Accounts of the violence say it was a "settling of personal scores" and that resentful Cree targeted some individual land owners in the area due to their past dealings with the Indigenous population, but not others. Resentment and anger was not directed at the European settlers as a whole but, rather against specific individuals and at the government. Some historians state that "many of the killings were the settling of personal scores."

Bill Waiser, in his book A World We Have Lost: Saskatchewan Before 1905 provides insight into the events at Fort Pitt. He said the relationship between the NWMP at Fort Pitt and the Cree was not as hostile as often thought.

"Had the plains Cree been truly hostile and intended on waging war, they would have attacked the fort almost immediately and not given the police any time to try and fortify their position. That they waited several days confirmed that the murders were unpremeditated and that this new action was largely motivated by the need for food and previsions for their large camp."

Daschuk also states that "police officers at Fort Pitt were spared in recognition of their humanity" suggesting the relationships may not have been as resentful as some held by people in other areas.

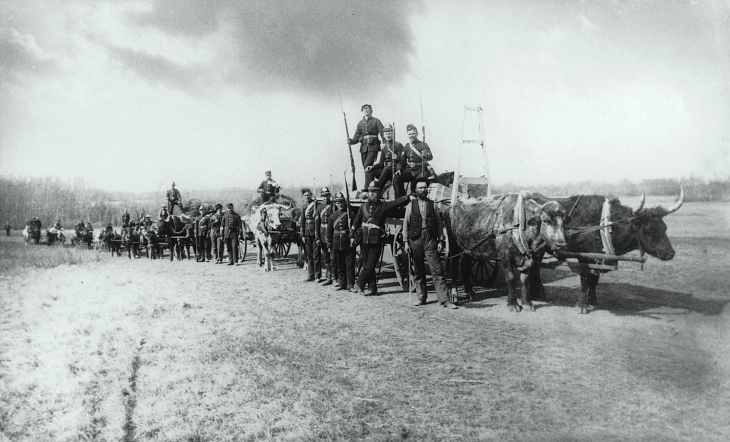
1885 rebellion

The only loss of European life at the hands of the Cree during the capture of Fort Pitt came when the search party sent out by Dickens accidentally rode their horses through a Cree camp. The surprised people in the camp feared that they were under attack by the NWMP, fired at the intruders, starting a brief fire fight. Three Cree were killed. Constable David Cowan was fatally wounded. Constable Lawrence Loasby was wounded but escaped, only to be captured by Cree pursuers a short time later. The Cree captured another NWMP officer as well. This short but intense fight influenced Dickens to order his withdrawal, leaving Fort Pitt vacant of NWMP and surrendering it to the Cree without resistance.

Dickens was also moved by the threat that the Cree group might set the fort on fire if he resisted.

The Indians told Mclean they wouldn't even need to attack the fort. They had brought 40 gallons (Note: 180 L) of coal oil from Frog lake, more than enough to set the small stockade and the building it contained ablaze

On 17 April 1885, the members of the Mistahimaskwa Cree Nation effectively took control of Fort Pitt and successfully negotiated the evacuation of the NWMP. The members of the Mistahimaskwa Cree Nation successfully maintained control of Fort Pitt until 2 July 1885 when they surrendered to the NWMP.

After the police force was dispatched from the fort the remaining men, women, and children were given the choice to either leave the fort or stay as "hostages" the majority chose to stay. By most recorded accounts, they were treated with relative dignity and respect. This further promotes the idea put forth by Waiser that this movement on Fort Pitt was not intended as an act of pure aggression, but one created out of the necessity to feed themselves and gain adequate supplies.

During the second sacking of Fort Pitt on 9 April, the Cree under the orders of Wandering Spirit raided the remaining resources and set fire to the fort, destroying all but one of the service buildings.

On 26 May, a mounted column arrived at Fort Pitt to see the remains still smouldering in the aftermath of the Cree raid. The members of the column were "sobered by the discovery of the body of Constable David Cowan, his heart removed and placed on a nearby pole." Fort Pitt's location and the fact that it was situated at the divergence of many trails led the column to reclaiming it setting up headquarters.

The actions of the Cree warriors at Fort Pitt as well as other locations such as Frog lake during the Rebellion of 1885 were contributing factors in the government's creation of the Alberta Field Force on 20 April 1885. The Alberta Field Force consisted of one thousand men, and was tasked with ending the rebellion and returning peace to the land. They marched unimpeded from Calgary east meeting their first significant resistance upon arrival in the Fort Pitt region. The Alberta Field Force encountered and interrupted a group of Cree performing a thirst dance, in which the Cree were searching for spiritual guidance. This was happening at the base of Frenchman Butte. This encounter and the violent outbreak afterwards would be described as "one of the most indecisive skirmishes during the tragedy of 1885."

Frenchman Butte is located 18 kilometres (11 mi) north-west of Fort Pitt, and it is a significant historical site for the role it played in the Battle of Batoche. It was at this location that the Alberta Field Force marched upon the some of Big Bear's Cree while they were participating in a thirst dance after leaving Fort Pitt. The Alberta Field Forces interruption of the thirst dance lead to the retreat of the Cree to the rifle pits throughout the plains. "Big Bear's soldiers installed themselves in deep rifle pits above the surrounding plains." The short Battle of Frenchman's Butte occurred, but soon after it began, the Canadian Militia realized that Big Bear's men had the superior tactical position, and they were forced to retreat to the safety of Fort Pitt, while Big Bear's men retreated in the opposite direction startled by the firepower of the Alberta Field Force.

=== Post North-West Rebellion history ===
The next September, the fort was rebuilt by Angus McKay. In 1887, a branch post was built at Onion Lake about 32 kilometres (20 mi) to the north-west. In 1890, everything was moved to Onion Lake, and Fort Pitt was closed.

In 1944, Fort Pitt was sold to a local rancher, Robert Henry Hougham (1889-1960), with the intent to cultivate the land for agricultural purposes. On the commencement of land cultivation, Hougham discovered shallow graves located in close proximity to the remains of the original fort. It is unknown at this time the specifics surrounding the remains as many of the tombstones and other identifying landmarks were destroyed during the fires and rebellion in 1885. Hougham reconstructed one of the early structures and worked the land for 16 years until his death in 1960. He was buried on the property near a stone cairn that had been erected at the site in 1954.

In 1954, Fort Pitt was designated a national historic site of Canada. According to the Parks Canada Directory of Federal Heritage Designations, the significance of Fort Pitt to Canadian heritage is "the Hudson's Bay Company built the post to trade in buffalo hides, meat and pemmican; It was the site of the signing of Treaty No. 6 in 1876; and, it was burned during the 1885 rebellion by Big Bear's followers after the police had withdrawn to Battleford."

== Fort Pitt Provincial Park ==
Fort Pitt Provincial Park
- Interactive map of Fort Pitt Provincial Park
- Type: Provincial park
- Location: Frenchman Butte, Saskatchewan, Canada
- Area: 10.4 ha (26 acres)
- Established: 26 May 1986
- Owner: Government of Saskatchewan
- Administrator: Saskatchewan Parks

In 1986, approximately 10.4 ha (26 acres) of land surrounding the remains of Fort Pitt was designated as a provincial park by the government of Saskatchewan. Fort Pitt Provincial Park is located several kilometres east of Harlan, and roughly 5 kilometres (3.1 mi) north-west of Hewitt Landing, in western Saskatchewan. It is accessed off Highway 797.

The historical site itself consists of the architectural remains of two of the forts that were located in the area. They have been partially excavated and presented for interpretive purposes. The outlines of the first two forts are also visible, as well as one reconstructed building designed in accordance with the second fort.

In the park, there is access to the archaeological remains of two forts, the North Saskatchewan River, and a picnic area. It also features geotracking as a recreational activity. The park is a museum and a provincial heritage property.

== See also ==
- Battle of Frenchman's Butte
- List of protected areas of Saskatchewan
- Tourism in Saskatchewan
- History of Saskatchewan
