= Honoré Jackson =

Canadian activist (1861–1952)

Honoré Jaxon
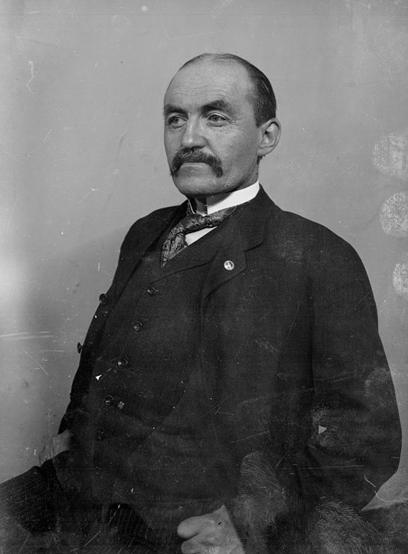
- Honoré Jaxon, 1907, Chicago
- Born: May 3, 1861; Toronto, Canada West
- Died: January 10, 1952 (aged 90); New York City
- Citizenship: Canadian
- Education: University of Toronto
- Employer: Louis Riel
- Known for: Secretary to Louis Riel during the North-West Rebellion in Canada, participant in Coxey's Army
- Spouse: Aimée

William Henry Jackson (May 3, 1861 – January 10, 1952), also known as Honoré Jackson or Jaxon, was secretary to Louis Riel during the North-West Rebellion in Canada in 1885. He was married to Aimée, a former teacher in Chicago.

He was born in Toronto, Canada West, to a Methodist family, but several years later his family moved to Wingham, Ontario. Jackson later attended the University of Toronto for three years; however, due to his father's bankruptcy, he was unable to complete his last year. In 1881 he moved to Prince Albert in the North-West Territories' District of Saskatchewan, where he soon began to sympathize with the Métis and their struggle against the Canadian government, though he was not a Métis himself. Jackson became personal secretary to Louis Riel when Riel returned to Canada in 1884, and the two organized a Métis militia and planned a provisional government. Open fighting broke out between the disgruntled Métis and the North-West Mounted Police along with hastily raised militia on March 18 at Duck Lake.

That same day (18 March 1885), Jackson was baptized Catholic by Father Fourmond. Riel stood as godfather for the ceremony and gave him the name "Honoré Joseph Jaxon". The next day Riel declared the establishment of a provisional government (see Exovedate).

However, Jackson's mental health was affected by the religious event, and by the turmoil and excitement of open rebellion, and within days, Riel imprisoned Jackson, perhaps thinking he had gone insane but also fearing that his eccentric religious ideas and his support for Henry George's radical philosophical ideas against private ownership of land may cause discord within his (Riel's) followers. Later during the rebellion, Riel released Jackson.

He was captured when Canadian government troops overcame the last Métis resistance in the Battle of Batoche ending on May 12, 1885. He was tried for treason, but found not guilty by reason of insanity and sent to an insane asylum in Lower Fort Garry, near Winnipeg, Manitoba. He escaped the asylum on November 2 and fled to the United States.

Once there, he changed his name to Honoré Jaxon and joined the labour union movement in Chicago, Illinois, and was active in socialist circles as well. He also decided to lie about his identity and told others he was a Métis. In 1894 he was part of Coxey's Army, which marched to Washington, DC, to demand an eight-hour workday. In 1897 he converted to the Baháʼí Faith and oriented his concerns to Canada.

He returned to Canada briefly between 1907 and 1909, spending some of the time interviewing former participants of the Rebellion and addressing labour/socialist meetings. He returned to the United States, eventually moving to New York City. He collected books, newspapers, and pamphlets relating to the Métis people in an attempt to establish in their honour a museum in New York. However, years went by and he slipped into poverty and extreme old age. He was evicted from his apartment on December 12, 1951, and his collection (considered unimportant by the city) was sold as waste paper. He died a month later.

Jackson is remembered in the song "Honoré" by Canadian singer James Keelaghan on his 1995 album A Recent Future.

== Sources ==
- Smith, Donald B. (1981). Honoré Joseph Jaxon. A Man Who Lived for Others. Saskatchewan History 34:(3) 81–?.
- Smith, Donald B. (2007). Honoré Jaxon: Prairie Visionary. Regina: Coteau Books. ISBN 978-1-55050-367-8..
- Bob Beal and Rod Macleod, Prairie Fire: the 1885 North-West Rebellion, second edition, Toronto, McClelland and Stewart, 1994.
