= List of battles won by Indigenous peoples of the Americas =

The following is a list of battles won by Indigenous peoples of the Americas against non-Indigenous peoples:

== North America ==
- Ajacan Mission Massacre
- Battle of Birch Coulee
- Battle of Bloody Run
- Battle of Bloody Brook
- Battle of the Caloosahatchee
- Battle of Cieneguilla
- Battle of Devil's Hole
- Battle of Duck Lake
- Battle of Fish Creek
- Battle of Fort Buchanan
- Battle of Fort Pitt
- Massacre at Fort William Henry
- Battle of Frenchman's Butte
- Battle of Hembrillo Basin
- Battle of Julesburg
- Battle of Lake Okeechobee
- Battle of the Little Bighorn
- Battles of the Loxahatchee
- Battle of Mackinac Island (1814)
- Battle of Nautla
- Battle of Platte Bridge
- Battle of Powder River
- Battle of Punished Woman's Fork
- Battle of the Rosebud
- Battle of Sand Butte
- Battle of Stillman's Run
- Battle of Turkey Springs
- Battle of Yellow House Canyon
- Capture of Fort Jefferson (Kentucky)
- Capture of Fort Sandusky
- Chichimeca War
- Chickasaw Campaign of 1736
- Chickasaw Campaign of 1739
- Chickasaw Wars
- Dade Battle
- Deerfield Massacre
- First Battle of Dragoon Springs
- First Battle of Pyramid Lake
- First Battle of the Stronghold
- Fetterman Fight
- Frog Lake Massacre
- Fort Mims Massacre
- Fourth Battle of Tucson
- Gallinas massacre
- Grattan massacre
- Great Raid of 1840
- Harmar Campaign
- Kidder Fight
- Lancaster Raid
- Narváez Expedition
- Northern Cheyenne Exodus
- Pueblo Revolt
- Raid on Dover
- Sheteck Massacre
- Spirit Lake Massacre
- St. Clair's Defeat (Battle of the Wabash)
- Tonkawa Massacre
- Wheeler's Surprise
- Battle of Fort Dearborn
- Battle of Sugar Point
- Battle of Wild Cat Creek
- Córdoba Expedition
- La Noche Triste

== South America ==
- Arauco War
- Battle of Catirai
- Battle of Curalaba
- Battle of Las Cangrejeras
- Battle of Marihueñu
- Battle of Ollantaytambo
- Battle of Río Bueno
- Battle of Tucapel
- Destruction of Santiago
- Destruction of the Seven Cities
- Juan Santos Rebellion
- Battle of Sangarará

== See also ==
- List of Indian massacres in North America
- List of Indigenous rebellions in Mexico and Central America
