= Wandering Spirit =

Wandering Spirit may refer to:

- Hungry ghost, a Chinese Buddhist, Japanese Buddhist, Tibetan Buddhist, Taoist, and Chinese folk religious concept
- Wandering Spirit (Cree leader) (c. 1845–1885), Cree war chief
- Wandering Spirit (album), a 1993 album by Mick Jagger

== See also ==
- Soul wandering, an Inuit culture-bound syndrome
