= Leif Newry Fitzroy Crozier =

Canadian police officer (1846–1901)

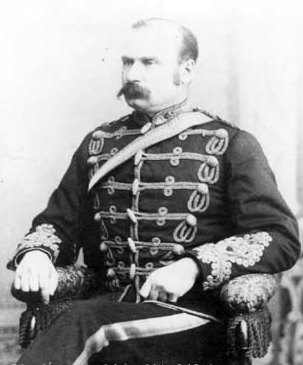
- L.N.F. Crozier c. 1880
- Born: 11 June 1846; Newry, Ireland, UK
- Died: 25 February 1901 (aged 54) Cushing, Oklahoma Territory
- Buried: Belleville, Ontario
- Allegiance: Dominion of Canada
- Branch: Canadian Militia; North-West Mounted Police
- Service years: 1863-1873 (Canadian Militia); 1872-1886 (NWMP)
- Rank: Major (Canadian Militia); Assistant Commissioner (NWMP)
- Conflicts: Fenian Raids; North-West Rebellion
- Other work: merchant and banker

Leif Newry Fitzroy Crozier (11 June 1846 – 25 February 1901), commonly known as L. N. F. Crozier, was a Canadian Militia officer and a superintendent of the North-West Mounted Police (NWMP), now best remembered for his role in the North-West Rebellion of 1885, a resistance movement headed by Métis leader Louis Riel in what is now the modern province of Saskatchewan.

== Early life ==
Crozier was born in June 1846 in Ireland. The family emigrated to Canada and settled in Belleville, Canada West. In Belleville he tried a number of occupations such as printing, clerking in stores and offices, and in a lawyer's office. Subsequently, he studied for a period at a medical college. The military had been Crozier's earliest interest, and he had enlisted in the Canadian Militia at the age of 16 with the 15th Battalion Volunteer Militia (Infantry) Canada. He had served during the Fenian raids and by 1873 reached the rank of major in the militia.

== Career ==
Crozier was commissioned as Sub-Inspector in the NWMP in 1872, and was promoted to Inspector the following year. In the service, Crozier saw first hand the hardships faced by the Native people as the buffalo disappeared. By 1884, he was the Superintendent stationed in Fort Carlton. He warned Lieutenant-Governor Edgar Dewdney that government policies were creating unrest among the First Nations and Métis. Since he feared a repetition of the Red River Rebellion, he asked for reinforcements to be sent to the North-West.

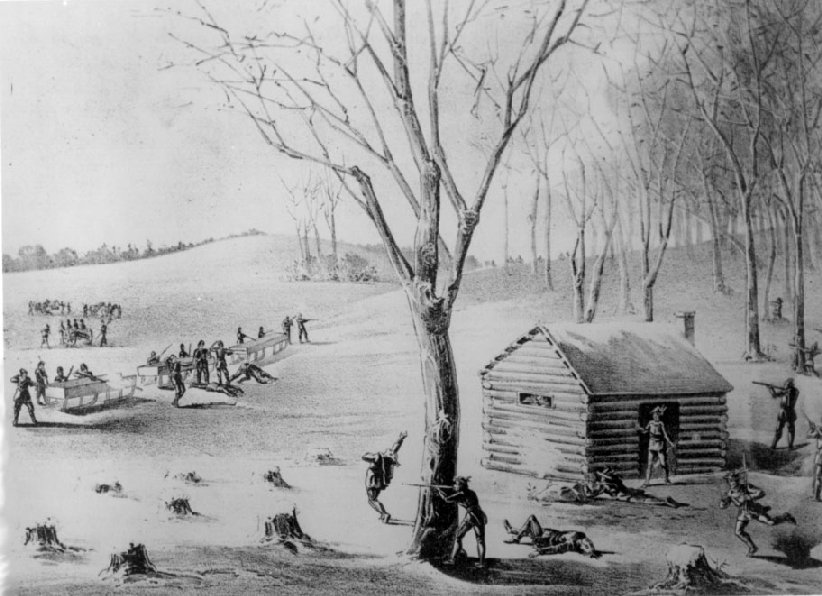
Battle of Duck Lake

Wanting to avoid conflict, he attempted to negotiate with Louis Riel but was unsuccessful leaving the situation in a stalemate. On 26 March 1885, Crozier led a group of approximately 100 mounted police and Prince Albert Volunteers from Fort Carlton and a seven-pounder gun to bring back provisions which were running low at Fort Carlton. These men were confronted by Gabriel Dumont and a superior force of Métis near Duck Lake, Saskatchewan; no shots were fired and the police returned to Fort Carlton. In the ensuing Battle of Duck Lake, the NWMP were routed by the Métis. The resistance that he had wanted to avoid earlier broke out. On 21 March 1885, Major Crozier received a letter from Louis Riel demanding that he surrender or Riel will "commence without delay, a war of extermination upon those who have shown themselves hostile to our rights." The retreat of the government under heavy fire tarnished the reputation of the NWMP. Crozier's role in the remainder of the rebellion was minimal, and his force largely remained at its post in Battleford, Saskatchewan. His march on Duck Lake and into an ambush stalled his career with the NWMP. Nevertheless, he was on 1 April promoted to assistant commissioner of the NWMP, a post which he held until his retirement in 1886. In 1886, after the Prime Minister, Sir John A. Macdonald, appointed a civilian commissioner instead of himself, he resigned. He spent his later years in as a merchant and banker in Oklahoma Territory, dying of a heart attack in Cushing, Oklahoma Territory on 25 February 1901. His body was brought back to Belleville, Ontario, to be buried.

== See also ==
Saskatchewan Herald, Articles on the Frog Lake Massacre, Article Carlton
