= Provisional Government of Saskatchewan =

Former state in Canada

Provisional Government of Saskatchewan Gouvernement provisoire de la Saskatchewan (French)
- 1885
- Flag
- Status: Unrecognized state, Provisional Government
- Capital: Batoche
- Common languages: French (Métis French), Michif, Cree
- Spiritual Leader [Unofficial]
  - 1885: Louis Riel
- Military Leader
  - 1885: Gabriel Dumont
- President of the Exovedate
  - 1885: Pierre Parenteau
- Legislature: Exovedate
- History
  - Established: March 19
  - Disestablished: May 20
Preceded by	Succeeded by
Canada; North-West Territories	Canada; North-West Territories
- Today part of: Canada: Saskatchewan

The Southbranch Settlements are circled in black.

The Provisional Government of Saskatchewan was a provisional government during the North-West Rebellion of 1885 in the District of Saskatchewan of the North-West Territories (Note: It included parts of the present-day Canadian provinces of Alberta, Saskatchewan, and Manitoba.). The name was given by Louis Riel. Although Riel initially hoped to rally the Countryborn, Cree, and European settlers of the Saskatchewan Valley to his banner, this did not occur. The government, with the exception of Honoré Jaxon and Chief White Cap, had an entirely French-speaking and Métis leadership. Gabriel Dumont was proclaimed adjutant general in which capacity he became supreme military commander, although Riel could, and did, override his tactical decisions. The Provisional Government was declared by Riel on March 19, 1885. It ceased to exist following the defeat of the Métis militarily during the Battle of Batoche, which concluded on May 20, 1885. During its existence the government only exercised authority over the Southbranch Settlements along the South Saskatchewan River. Other major centres in the area such as Prince Albert, Saskatoon, and most First Nations reserves remained outside of its control.

== Exovedate ==
The governing council was named the Exovedate, Latin for "of the flock", and debated issues ranging from military policy to local bylaws and theological issues. It met at Batoche, Saskatchewan, and only exercised real authority during its existence over the Southbranch Settlement. The members, called Exovedes, were acclaimed by Gabriel Dumont (elected head of the military) on the 19th of March. Pierre Parenteau was made its president.

The provisional government collapsed with the fall of Batoche (see Battle of Batoche) and Riel was captured a few days later. Gabriel Dumont escaped to Montana.

== Flag ==
On 19 March 1885, the day of the provisional government's proclamation, Father Vital Fourmond, a witness to the proclamation, wrote about the provisional government's flag. "As a flag [Riel] chose the white flag of ancient France, with a royal blue shield bearing three golden fleurs de lys, saying that he was called to renew its ancient glories. On it he placed a large image of Mary's immaculate heart."

== Legacy ==
BATOCHE. In 1872, Xavier Letendre dit Batoche founded a village at this site where Métis freighters crossed the South Saskatchewan River. About 50 families had claimed the river lots in the area by 1884. Widespread anxiety regarding land claims and a changing economy provoked a resistance against the Canadian Government. Here, 300 Métis and Indians led by Louis Riel and Gabriel Dumont fought a force of 800 men commanded by Major-General Middleton between May 9 and 12, 1885. The resistance failed but the battle did not mean the end of the community of Batoche.

— Historic Sites and Monuments board of Canada. Government of Canada

Batoche, where the Métis Provisional Government had been formed, has been declared a National Historic Site. Batoche marks the site of Gabriel Dumont's grave site, Albert Caron's House, Batoche school, Batoche cemetery, Letendre store, Gabriels river crossing, Gardepy's crossing, Batoche crossing, St. Antoine de Padoue Church, Métis rifle pits, and RNWMP battle camp.

In the spring of 2008, Tourism, Parks, Culture and Sport Minister Christine Tell proclaimed in Duck lake, that "the 125th commemoration, in 2010, of the 1885 North-West Resistance is an excellent opportunity to tell the story of the prairie Métis and First Nations peoples' struggle with Government forces and how it has shaped Canada today."

== See also ==
- The Canadian Crown and Aboriginal peoples
