= Battle of Frenchman's Butte =

1885 battle of the North-West Rebellion

- Part of the North-West Rebellion
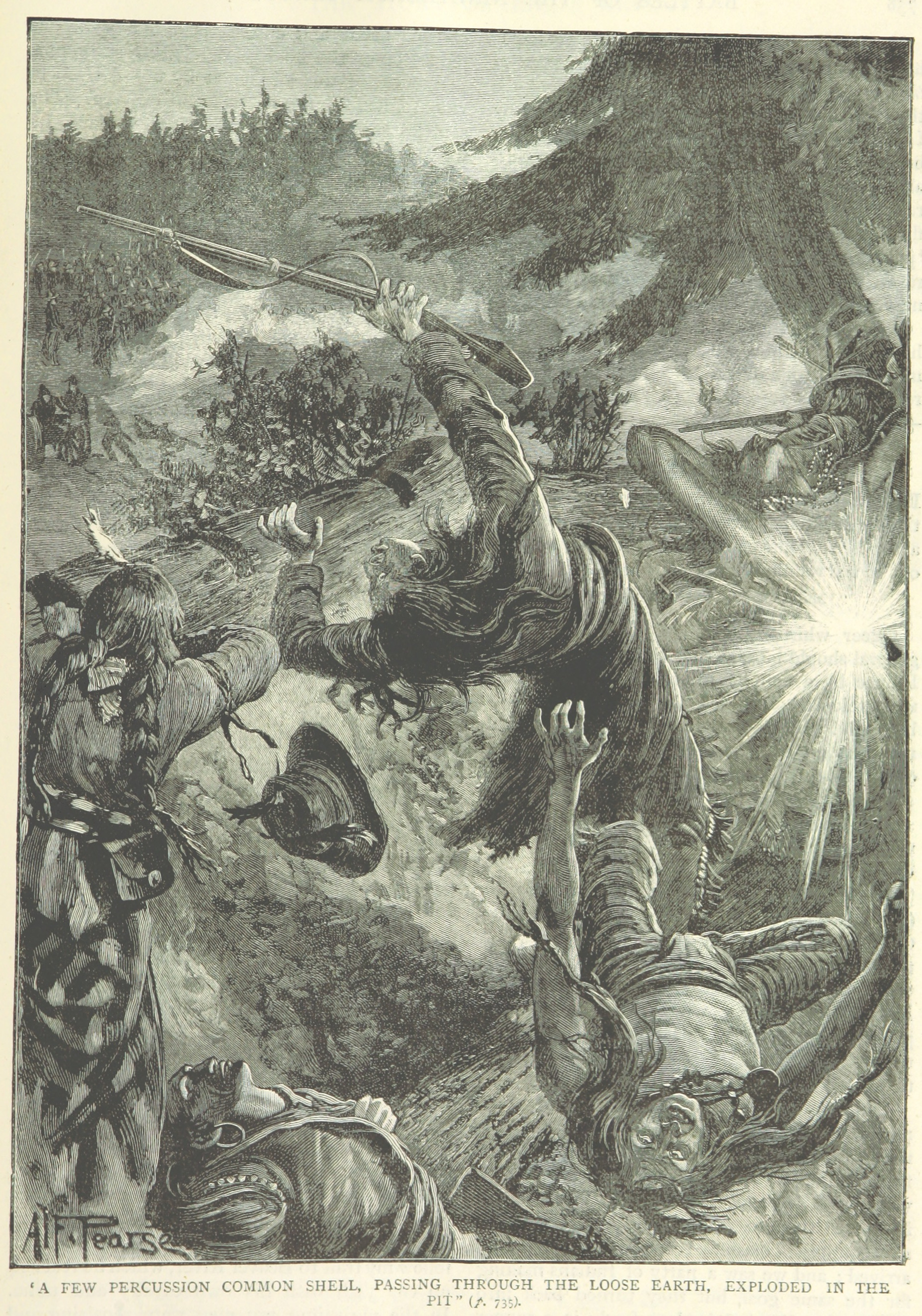
- Alberta Field Force artillery fires on Cree fighters (illustration from a British book)
Date	May 28, 1885
Location	53°37′38″N 109°34′33″W; Frenchman's Butte, Saskatchewan
Result	Cree victory

Belligerents
Cree	Canada

Commanders and leaders
Wandering Spirit	Thomas Bland Strange

Strength
200	400

National Historic Site of Canada
- Official name: Frenchman Butte National Historic Site of Canada
- Designated: 1929

The District of Saskatchewan in 1885 (within the black diamonds) included the central section of Saskatchewan and extended into Alberta and Manitoba.

The Battle of Frenchman's Butte, fought on May 28, 1885, occurred when the Alberta Field Force attacked a force of Cree, dug in on a hillside near Frenchman's Butte. The battlefield is located in what was then the District of Saskatchewan of the North-West Territories, now the province of Saskatchewan.

== Background ==
Members of a band of Cree led by war chief Wandering Spirit, living in what is now central Alberta and Saskatchewan joined the North-West Rebellion of 1885 after the government forces' defeat at the Battle of Duck Lake. The starving fighters seized food and supplies from several white settlements and captured Fort Pitt, taking prisoners. Major-General Thomas Bland Strange, a retired British officer living near Calgary, raised a force of cowboys and other white settlers,. With that force, two units of North-West Mounted Police (NWMP), and three units of regular army troops from Ontario and Quebec, he headed north with a force of some 1,000 men.

His column consisted of the Sixty-fifth Battalion 232 soldiers; Winnipeg Provisional Battalion (92nd) 307 soldiers; Strange's Rangers (Alberta scouts) 50 men, and 67 NWMP policemen.

While he left some of his force to provide protection for isolated white settlements along the way, he secured Edmonton then led his column east to Fort Pitt. As the force approached, Cree insurgents burnt the fort as they retreated to nearby hills. Over the next few days, Strange's scouts fought skirmishes with small groups of insurgents. Then in pursuit of Big Bear, the force marched to the area of Frenchman's Butte. On the night of May 27, the Cree dug in at the top of a hill east of the butte and waited.

== The battle ==
Early on the morning of May 28, the Cree fighters divided into two groups. Wandering Spirit, the Cree war chief, led some 200 fighters to take positions in trenches and rifle pits on top of the hill, while Little Poplar and the other group remained to protect the camp, some 3 km (two miles) away. General Strange arrived opposite the Cree-occupied hill at six in the morning and opened fire with a small cannon. The Cree then opened fire with their guns on Strange's soldiers.

Some of his soldiers started across the valley but found it soft going due to muskeg. As well, movement forward came under fire from Cree fighters on top of a steep, open hillside, making a frontal assault suicidal. Strange pulled his forces back and deployed them along the bottom of the valley. The two units of NWMP formed the left flank. To their right was the 65th Battalion, Mount Royal Rifles, with the Winnipeg Light Infantry Battalion in the centre, while the right flank was formed by Strange's Alberta scouts.

The two sides exchanged gunfire for three hours. Cree rifle fire wounded some of the soldiers in the valley, while Strange's artillery put holes in the hillside, damaging the trenches where Cree sheltered.

Eventually, General Strange ordered Major Sam Steele to lead the NWMP north and outflank the Cree fighters. This manoevre was seen and Wandering Spirit and others moved along the crests of hills parallel to Steele and occasionally fired on them. This caused Steele to believe the Cree's lines were longer than they were, so he ordered his NWMP force to turn back.

Around the same time, some Cree warriors outflanked the Alberta Mounted Rifles and almost captured the column's supply train. Afraid of being attacked from behind, General Strange ordered his force to retreat. Strange's troops withdrew to Fort Pitt. The Cree fighters slipped away later that day, and soon more than 1,000 soldiers resumed their search for Big Bear's band.

H.A. MacKay later recounted the day's events and its aftermath.

"On May 29, near Frenchman's Butte Inspector S.B. Steele made contact with an Indian scouting party. Steele's scouts called out to the party and were fired upon. Steele's troops returned fire and killed the first Indian casualty of the war. They rode down with a friend to view the remains and found his body on top the hill where he evidently had been dragged by the scout. His body was stripped of all clothing with the rope (cut short to about one yard in length) still around his neck, which had cut into his jaw. He was a huge fine-looking Indian, 'Ma-me-book' by name. The scout who had captured his mount (a swift-footed black stallion belonging to the HBCo) had galloped around the prairie with the rope attached to his saddle pommel, trailing the body in the grass in circles, the trails of which were still visible. He had thus been left exposed for days before being buried; and his body from the intense heat, was huge in size when I saw him. I requested to have him buried." H.A. MacKay, memories, HBCo archives and Glenbow Archives.

== Conclusion ==
The battle was a victory for Big Bear's band, albeit a hollow one. It bought them time to escape from Strange, but continued resistance was hopeless. The Métis had been defeated at the Battle of Batoche three weeks earlier, and Poundmaker's joint Cree-Assiniboine force had surrendered.

Big Bear's band fell apart during the retreat to the north after the battle. The Battle of Loon Lake on June 3 demoralized them further. By early July the rebellion was over. Big Bear had surrendered at Carlton and was in prison. Wandering Spirit was later executed along with seven others.

General Strange retired back to his ranch, and the Alberta Field Force disbanded.

== Legacy ==
In the spring of 2008, Tourism, Parks, Culture and Sport Minister Christine Tell proclaimed in Duck Lake, that "the 125th commemoration, in 2010, of the 1885 Northwest Resistance is an excellent opportunity to tell the story of the prairie Métis and First Nations peoples' struggle with Government forces and how it has shaped Canada today".

Frenchman Butte is a national historic site of Canada, which locates the theatre of the 1885 battle staged between Cree and Canadian troops.

== See also ==
- List of battles won by Indigenous peoples of the Americas
