= Thomas Bland Strange =

Canadian militia officer

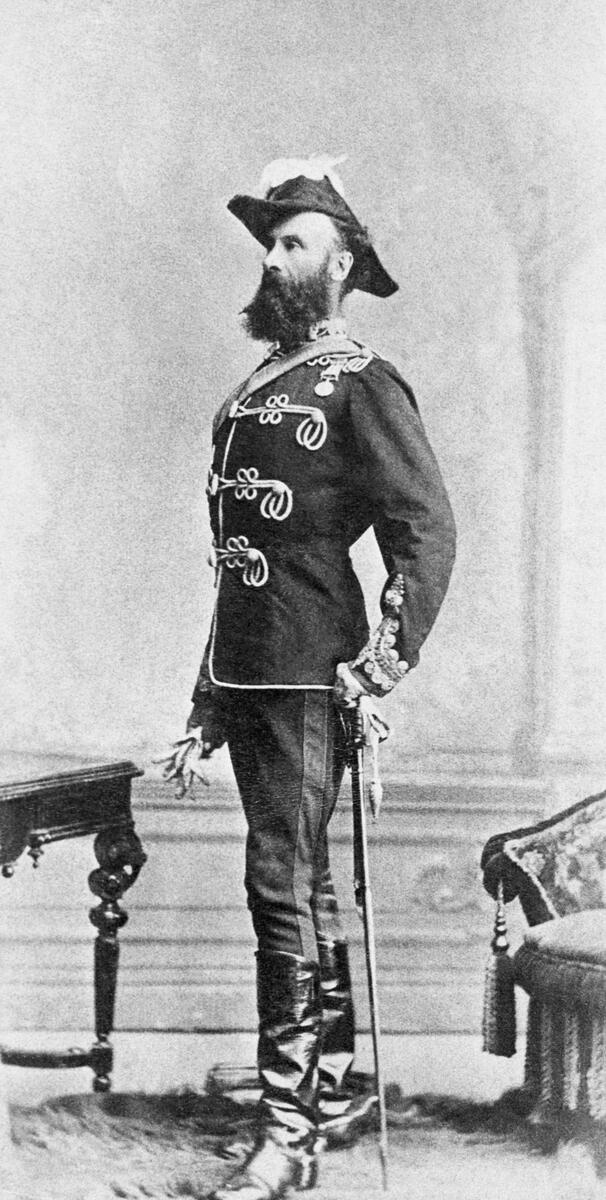
- Born: 15 September 1831; Meerut, British Raj
- Died: 9 July 1925 (aged 93); Camberley, England
- Alma mater: Royal Military Academy Woolwich
- Military career
- Allegiance: British Empire
- Branch: British Army; Canadian Militia
- Service years: 1851–1885
- Rank: Major-General
- Nickname: Gunner Jingo
- Unit: Royal Artillery
- Commands: Alberta Field Force
- Conflicts: Indian Rebellion of 1857; North-West Rebellion: Battle of Frenchman's Butte
- Awards: Indian Mutiny Medal; Mentioned in dispatches

Thomas Bland Strange (15 September 1831 – 9 July 1925), known as 'Gunner Jingo', was a British officer noted for his service with the Canadian Militia during the North-West Rebellion of 1885. As a Royal Artillery officer posted to Canada, Strange was instrumental in establishing the country's fledgeling artillery regiments following Canadian Confederation and has been referred to as the ‘Father of Canadian Artillery’.

== Military career ==
Strange was born to a military family in British India and was educated at Edinburgh Academy. With his family unable to afford the cost of a commission in an infantry or cavalry regiment, he attended the Royal Military Academy Woolwich, and commissioned into the Royal Artillery in 1851 at the age of twenty. He saw a number of postings across garrisons of the British Empire, with his first posting being Gibraltar in 1852 (where he was promoted to first lieutenant on 21 November 1852), followed by Jamaica in 1856.

Strange was posted to India in 1857 during the Indian Mutiny, where he saw service at the Siege of Lucknow. His military records show he was awarded the Indian Mutiny Medal with Clasp and was mentioned in dispatches four times. He was promoted second captain (a now-obsolete rank peculiar to the Royal Artillery) on 16 September 1858.

Strange married Maria Elinor Taylor at Simla, the summer capital of the Raj, in November 1862. Strange was posted back to Britain, serving in Ireland and as an artillery instructor at Woolwich. Strange's military records show the marriage produced two children, Henry Bland Strange, baptised at Killarney, and Alexander Wilmot Strange, baptised at Woolwich.

== Life in Canada ==
Following Canadian Confederation in 1867, the new Dominion of Canada became largely responsible for its own defence and garrisons of British regulars were withdrawn. As an artillery officer, in 1871 Strange was offered command of B Battery of the newly established Canadian Garrison Artillery at the Citadel in Quebec City.

Strange did much to establish these first permanent forces, and is best known in Canada as the 'Father of Canadian Artillery' and one of the initial organizers of the new Canadian army.

Strange was a retired major-general at the time of the North-West Rebellion, and was raising cavalry horses near modern Calgary, Alberta. At the outbreak of the rebellion, his old friend Adolphe-Philippe Caron, who was Minister of Militia and Defence in the government of Sir John A. Macdonald, asked Strange to organize a field force for the District of Alberta. This force, consisting of a mix of inexperienced militiamen, two units of the North-West Mounted Police, and regular army units from Montreal and Winnipeg, secured Edmonton from potential attack. The force then pursued Big Bear's band, meeting his fighters in the Battle of Frenchman's Butte and Loon Lake.

== Later life ==
Following the 1885 rebellion, Strange returned to his ranch in Alberta. In 1887, he sold his property in Canada and returned to England. He contributed an article to the Canadian Defence Quarterly at the age of 93. He died at Camberley, England, in 1925.

== Publications ==
- Artillery retrospect of the last great war, 1870, with its lessons for Canadians (Quebec, 1874)
- Manual for the militia artillery of Canada for the federal Department of Militia and Defence (3 pts., Quebec, 1875–78).
- Colonial defensive organization: précis of information concerning the province of Quebec (Quebec, 1876)
- The military aspect of Canada: a lecture delivered at the Royal United Service Institute (London, [1879?]);
- Gunner Jingo's Jubilee (London, 1893)
- “The father of the Canadian artillery, by ‘The Bombardier,’” Canadian Defence Quarterly (Ottawa), 2 (1924–25): 5–9.
