= Battle of Duck Lake =

1885 battle in Saskatchewan, Canada

Coordinates: 52°49′27.19″N 106°16′25.98″W

Battle of Duck Lake Bataille du lac aux Canards (French)
- Part of the North-West Rebellion
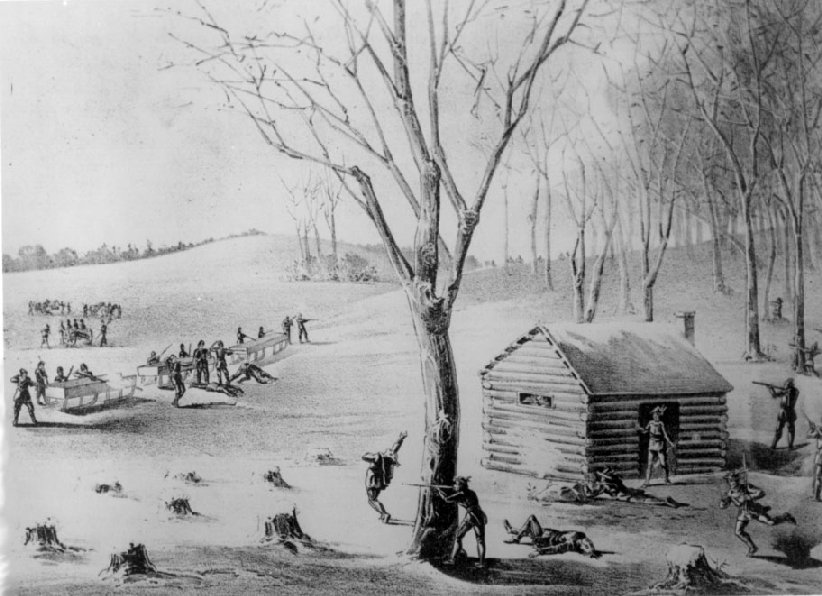
- This contemporary illustration of the Battle of Duck Lake offers a romanticized depiction of the skirmish.
Date	March 26, 1885
Location	Duck Lake, south of Prince Albert, Saskatchewan
Result	Métis victory

Belligerents
Provisional Government of Saskatchewan (Métis)	Canada

Commanders and leaders
Gabriel Dumont (WIA)	Leif Crozier

Strength
200–250	95

Casualties and losses
5–6 dead 3 wounded	12 dead 12 wounded

National Historic Site of Canada
- Official name: Battle of Duck Lake National Historic Site of Canada
- Designated: 1924

The District of Saskatchewan in 1885 (within the black diamonds) included the central section of Saskatchewan and extended into Alberta and Manitoba.
The Métis conflict area is circled in black.

The Battle of Duck Lake was an infantry skirmish on 26 March 1885 between North-West Mounted Police forces of the Government of Canada, and the Métis militia of Louis Riel's newly established Provisional Government of Saskatchewan. The skirmish took place 2.5 kilometres (1.6 mi) outside Duck Lake, Saskatchewan, and lasted approximately 30 minutes, after which Superintendent Leif Newry Fitzroy Crozier of the NWMP, his forces having endured fierce fire with twelve killed and eleven wounded, called for a general retreat. The battle is considered the initial engagement of the North-West Rebellion. Although Louis Riel proved to be victorious at Duck Lake, the general agreement among historians is that the battle was strategically a disappointment to his cause.

== Prelude ==
On March 19, 1885, Louis Riel self-affirmed the existence of the new Provisional Government of Saskatchewan. Following Riel's declaration, the Canadian government sought to reassert their control over the turbulent territory. Leif Crozier, the newly appointed NWMP superintendent and commander of northwestern Saskatchewan's forces, requested immediate reinforcement to Fort Carlton because he feared the growing instability created by Riel and the ever-growing possibility of a First Nations uprising. Riel dispatched emissaries to deliver an ultimatum calling for the surrender of Fort Carlton without bloodshed. Crozier's representatives rejected the demand and vowed that the Métis leaders would be brought to justice.

On March 25, in need of supplies for his men and horses, Crozier ordered Sergeant Alfred Stewart, Thomas McKay, and seventeen constables to Hillyard Mitchell's general goods store at Duck Lake. Unbeknownst to Crozier, however, commander Gabriel Dumont (Riel's right-hand man) and his Métis force had already entrenched themselves on the road to Duck Lake. On the morning of the 26th, Stewart's party encountered the band of Métis near Duck Lake. After ample harassment, Stewart decided not to risk a physical engagement, and chose to return to Fort Carlton; no shooting occurred. Crozier rallied together a larger force, which included 53 NWMP non-commissioned officers and men, 41 men of the Prince Albert Volunteers, and a 7-pounder cannon, and set out to secure the much-needed supplies and to reassert the authority of the Canadian government in the District of Saskatchewan.

== Battle ==
The forces met about 2.5 kilometres (1.6 mi) outside Duck Lake on a snowy plateau covered by trees, shrubs, and a few log cabins. Having spotted Crozier's force, Gabriel Dumont ordered his men to set up defensive positions around the log cabin and lie in wait. Similarly, Crozier's scouts informed the superintendent of the movements of the Métis; subsequently, Crozier ordered his men to halt and deploy their sleighs parallel to the road which was just before them. Both sides took up defensive positions.

Gabriel Dumont dispatched his brother, Isidore, and an elderly half-blind chief, Assiwiyin, with a white flag in hopes of distracting Crozier's forces. The superintendent, believing that Dumont was interested in a parley, walked forward with an English Métis interpreter, "Gentleman" Joe McKay. During the half-hearted discussion, Crozier came to believe that Isidore and Assiwiyin were stalling so that the Métis force could manoeuvre to flank his own men. As they began to leave, both Assiwiyin and Isidore attempted to draw their guns, prompting Crozier to give McKay the order to fire. A brief scuffle ensued between the two parties, which resulted in McKay shooting and killing both Isidore and Assiwyin.

Despite the firepower and training of Crozier's militia, the Métis force were more numerous and their position within the log cabins and the tree line proved to be an efficient advantage. In an attempt to relieve the pressure on the Prince Albert Volunteers, Crozier ordered the 7-pounder to target the log cabins. After numerous discharges, a shell was placed in before the powder charge was inserted, which disabled the cannon for the remainder of the battle.

Within half an hour, Crozier recognized the unavoidable and sounded a general retreat back to Fort Carlton. The Métis were eager to chase down Crozier and his retreating force, but Louis Riel intervened and declared the battle over.

== Aftermath ==
The battle toll was high for the government forces. Twelve men were killed, and eleven men seriously injured. For the opposing side, five Métis warriors were killed in the skirmish, including Dumont's brother. Furthermore, Gabriel Dumont himself was injured in the head by a passing bullet. Losing to Riel and the Métis force came as a great shock to Crozier's superiors. Colonel Acheson Irvine, Crozier's supervisor, suggested that Crozier's officerial prowess and judgement was overruled by impulsiveness.

Fort Carlton, a trading post with few defensive installations, was now in serious risk of attack. Immediately, Colonel Irvine summoned a council to discuss the future of Fort Carlton. The resounding unanimous decision was in favour of the evacuation and destruction of the fort. By 4 am on 28 March, the last sleigh had left the smouldering fort.

In the span of three days and with the loss of only five men, Riel's forces had defeated Crozier's militia, forced the destruction and scavenged the remains of Fort Carlton, and spread fear of a Métis uprising throughout the North-West Territories. Riel's plans were not completely successful, though: he had hoped to capture Crozier and his men as hostages so that he might force the government's hand. Thus, while tactically successful, the battle of Duck Lake proved to be a strategic disappointment for Riel.

== Legacy ==
"Duck Lake Battlefield—Here, on 26th March 1885, occurred the first combat between the Canadian Government Forces, under Major L.N.F. Crozier, and the Metis and Indians, under Gabriel Dumont. Ici, le 26 mars, 1885, eut lieu la première rencontre entre les troupes du gouvernement du Canada, commandées par le Major Crozier, et les Métis et Indiens commandés par Gabriel Dumont."

— National Historic Sites and Monuments Board

The site of the battle was designated a national historic site of Canada in 1924.

In the spring of 2008, Tourism, Parks, Culture and Sport Minister Christine Tell said in Duck Lake, that "the 125th commemoration, in 2010, of the 1885 Northwest Resistance is an excellent opportunity to tell the story of the prairie Métis and First Nations peoples' struggle with Government forces and how it has shaped Canada today."

Duck Lake is home to the Duck Lake Historical Museum and the Duck Lake Regional Interpretive Centre, and murals which reflect the history of the rebellion in the area. The Battle of Duck Lake and a buffalo jump are located here. The "First Shots Cairn" was erected on Saskatchewan Highway 212 as a landmark commemorating the scene of the first shots in the Battle of Duck Lake. The Our Lady of Lourdes Shrine at St. Laurent north of Duck Lake is a local pilgrimage site.

== See also ==
- List of battles won by Indigenous peoples of the Americas
