= Battleford (disambiguation) =

Battleford or Battlefords may refer to:

== Places ==
- Fort Battleford, a North-West Mounted Police post in what is now Saskatchewan, Canada
- Battleford, Saskatchewan, Canada; a town
- North Battleford, Saskatchewan, Canada; a city
- The Battlefords, Saskatchewan, Canada; both Battleford and North Battleford
- The Battlefords Provincial Park, a park in Saskatchewan

=== Electoral districts ===
- Battleford (provincial electoral district) (1904–1917), a former provincial riding in Saskatchewan, Canada
- Battleford-Cut Knife (1995–2003), a former provincial riding in Saskatchewan, Canada
- The Battlefords (provincial electoral district) (1917–1995; re-est. 2003), a provincial riding in Saskatchewan, Canada
- Battleford (federal electoral district) (1908–1925), a former federal riding in Saskatchewan, Canada
- South Battleford (1925–1935), a former federal riding in Saskatchewan, Canada
- North Battleford (electoral district) (1917–1949), a former federal riding in Saskatchewan, Canada
- The Battlefords (federal electoral district) (1935–1968), a former federal riding in Saskatchewan, Canada
- Battleford—Kindersley (1968–1979), a former federal riding in Saskatchewan, Canada
- The Battlefords—Meadow Lake (1979–1997), a former federal riding in Saskatchewan, Canada
- Battlefords—Lloydminster (est. 1997), a federal riding in Saskatchewan, Canada
- Battleford (territorial electoral district) (1888–1905), a former territorial electoral district in the North-West Territories, Canada

== Facilities and structures ==
- Battleford Court House, Battleford, Saskatchewan, Canada
- Battleford Industrial School (1883–1914), a former residential school for aboriginal Canadians
- Battleford Bridge, a former highway bridge across the North Saskatchewan River in Saskatchewan
- Battlefords Bridge, a highway bridge across the North Saskatchewan River in Saskatchewan

== Military topics ==
- HMCS Battleford, a Canadian Flower-class corvette of WWII
- The North Saskatchewan Regiment, formerly known as the Battleford Light Infantry
- Battle of Cut Knife (May 1885), a battle around Battleford, Saskatchewan, Canada
- Looting of Battleford (March 1885), a battle in Saskatchewan, Canada

== See also ==
- North Battleford (disambiguation)
- Battle (disambiguation)
- Ford (disambiguation)
