= Siege of Battleford =

Canadian siege during North-West rebellion

- Part of the North-West Rebellion
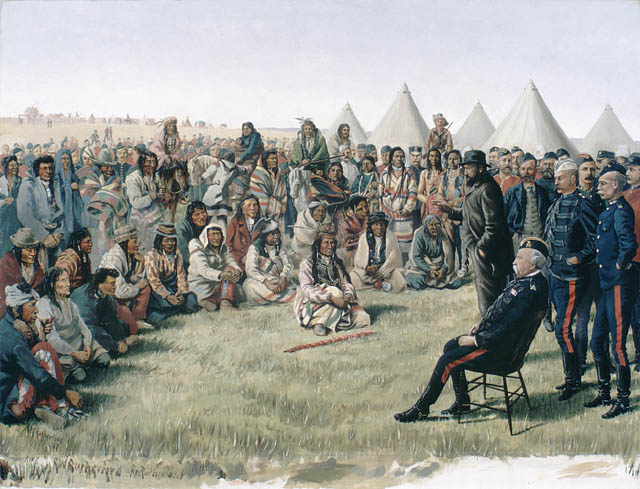
- Poundmaker surrenders to Middleton in Battleford May 26, 1885
Date	March 28 – May 26, 1885
Location	52.738°N 108.315°W; Battleford, North-West Territories
Result	Canadian victory

Belligerents
Cree	Canada

Commanders and leaders
Poundmaker (surrendered)	William Morris; Frederick Middleton (late)

Casualties and losses
7 killed	3 killed
- 2–6 civilians killed

The District of Saskatchewan in 1885 (within the black diamonds) included the central section of Saskatchewan and extended into Alberta and Manitoba.

The siege of Battleford was a siege during the North-West Rebellion that lasted from March 28 to May 26, 1885.

== Background ==
After the Métis victory at the Battle of Duck Lake on March 26, 1885, Cree bands who were sympathetic to the Métis cause and with grievances of their own began raiding stores and farms in the western part of the District of Saskatchewan for arms, ammunition, and food supplies. The raids caused civilians to flee to the larger settlements and forts of the North-West Territories.

== Beginning of the siege ==
On March 28, 1885, news arrived that Indian bands commanded by Poundmaker were on their way to Battleford. Five hundred civilians began moving into the nearby North-West Mounted Police post, Fort Battleford, for protection against the Cree raids. Fort Battleford was under the command of Colonel William Morris and had a small garrison of 25 police. During the night of March 29, nearby homesteads were raided and their horses and cattle rounded up by the Cree. On March 30, Poundmaker asked for a meeting with the Indian agent J. M. Rae. After Rae refused to meet with him, the Cree raided food and supplies from abandoned stores and houses. The next day, the Cree made camp near Battleford, replete with horses, cattle, and other looted provisions. The New Town was protected due to its proximity to the Fort and its cannon. However, the Old Town was not. The occupants of the Fort could only watch as the Old Town, about a mile away, was plundered, looted, and burned. Stolen vehicles and horses carried away the supplies of the Hudson's Bay Company and the other merchants. All the public buildings were sacked, including the Battleford Industrial School. On April 21, 1885, Francis Dickens and his men safely reached Battleford after the Battle of Fort Pitt.

== Lifting the siege ==
General Frederick Middleton's original plan was simple. He planned to march all his troops north from the railhead at Qu'Appelle to Louis Riel's capital in Batoche as he predicted that capturing Batoche would end the rebellion. Canadian Prime Minister Sir John A. Macdonald was pushing Middleton to end the rebellion as quickly as possible. But the militiamen under his command were mostly untrained volunteers whom Middleton would have to train as they marched to Batoche.

However, the killings at Frog Lake and the siege of Battleford forced Middleton to change his plan. He sent a large group under Lieutenant-Colonel William Dillon Otter north from the railhead at Swift Current to relieve Battleford and lift the siege. On May 1, Colonel Otter moved west from Battleford with 300 men. In the early morning of the next day on May 2, his force met with a Cree and Assiniboine force just west of Cut Knife Creek, 40 kilometres (25 mi) from Battleford which would result in the Battle of Cut Knife. The Indigenous force had the advantage of terrain and soon virtually surrounded Otter's troops on an inclined, triangular plain. Cree war chief Fine Day deployed his soldiers well in wooded ravines. After about six hours of fighting, Otter and his force retreated. The force could have suffered many deaths during the retreat but Chief Poundmaker persuaded the Indigenous fighters not to pursue the government troops. Otter's force suffered 8 dead and 14 wounded while Poundmaker's force only suffered 5–6 killed and 3 wounded.

The defeat at Cut Knife delayed the lifting of the siege and it only happened after Middleton's capture of Batoche. After the defeat of the Métis force at the Battle of Batoche and the capture of Louis Riel on May 15. Poundmaker ended the siege and surrendered to General Middleton at Fort Battleford on May 26, 1885.

== Aftermath ==
Casualties on both sides were relatively light. 3 militiamen, 7 Cree and 2–6 civilians were killed over the course of the siege. Most homes were burned, including the home of Judge Charles Rouleau. Just half a dozen buildings were left standing by the end of the siege. The amount of damage caused during the siege was reported to be upwards of $300,000 CAD.

== Debate ==
Like the rest of the North-West Rebellion, the Siege of Battleford is a source of debate among historians. Historian Douglas Hill in his book, The Opening of the Canadian West, characterized the besieging Cree as a "war party ... ready to take revenge for a winter of incalculable suffering" who "swooped on Battleford, killing six whites".

Historian George Stanley, writing on the event, indicated that the Cree were not murderous but were haphazard and bumbling. He stated "they did not appear to have in mind an attack upon the town but were content with prowling around the neighbourhood".

In October 2010, Parks Canada stated that its posters and programming do not use the word "siege" to describe the "sometimes violent, sometimes tragic events at the frontier community during the Northwest Rebellion."

== Sources ==
- Morton, Desmond (1999). A Military History of Canada. McClelland & Stewart. ISBN 978-0-7710-6514-9.
