= List of historic places in Battleford =

This article is a list of historic places in Battleford, Saskatchewan entered on the Canadian Register of Historic Places, whether they are federal, provincial, or municipal.

== List of historic places ==
Name	Address	Coordinates	Government recognition (CRHP №)	Wikidata ID	Image
The Station Building	92 22nd Street W Battleford SK	52°44′12″N 108°18′18″W	Battleford municipality (1530)		Upload Photo
Battleford Land Registry Office	Government Ridge; Battleford SK	52°42′53″N 108°18′54″W	Saskatchewan (2216)		Upload Photo
Former Bank of Montreal Building	201 22nd Street W Battleford SK	52°44′11″N 108°18′32″W	Saskatchewan (2307)		Upload Photo
Former Land Titles Building	291 23rd Street E Battleford SK	52°44′14″N 108°18′41″W	Battleford municipality (3314)		Upload Photo
Government House, Battleford	Government Ridge; Battleford SK	52°42′44″N 108°18′29″W	Saskatchewan (2916)	Q5588895	More images
District Court House	291 23rd Street W Battleford SK	52°44′14″N 108°18′40″W	Battleford municipality (6817)		
Fred Light Museum	11 20th Street E Battleford SK	52°44′03″N 108°18′07″W	Battleford municipality (6818)		Upload Photo
St. Vital Church	20th Street; Battleford SK	52°44′05″N 108°18′04″W	Battleford municipality (6820)		Upload Photo
Gardiner Church	131-20th Street West; Battleford SK	52°43′44″N 108°18′22″W	Battleford municipality (6824)		Upload Photo
Town Hall / Opera House	91 24th Street SW; Battleford SK	52°44′15″N 108°18′18″W	Battleford municipality (6826)		Upload Photo
Battleford Court House National Historic Site of Canada	291 23rd Street; Battleford SK	52°44′14″N 108°18′36″W	Federal (7384)	Q4873133	More images
Fort Battleford National Historic Site of Canada	Central Ave. - PO Box 70; Battleford SK	52°43′38″N 108°17′49″W	Federal (7611)	Q5470777	More images
Old Government House / Saint-Charles Scholasticate National Historic Site of Canada	52 7th Street West; Battleford SK	52°44′28″N 108°18′58″W	Federal (7644)	Q5588895	More images
Barracks No. 5	Battleford SK	52°43′33″N 108°17′49″W	Federal (9830)		Upload Photo
Guard House	Battleford SK	52°43′33″N 108°17′49″W	Federal (9841)		Upload Photo
Sick Horse Stable	Battleford SK	52°43′34″N 108°17′42″W	Federal (9948)		Upload Photo
Officers' Quarters	Battleford SK	52°43′35″N 108°17′38″W	Federal (10679)		Upload Photo
Commanding Officer's Residence	Battleford SK	52°43′35″N 108°17′38″W	Federal (16130)		Upload Photo

== See also ==
- List of National Historic Sites of Canada in Saskatchewan
