= Wandering Spirit (Cree leader) =

Cree war chief

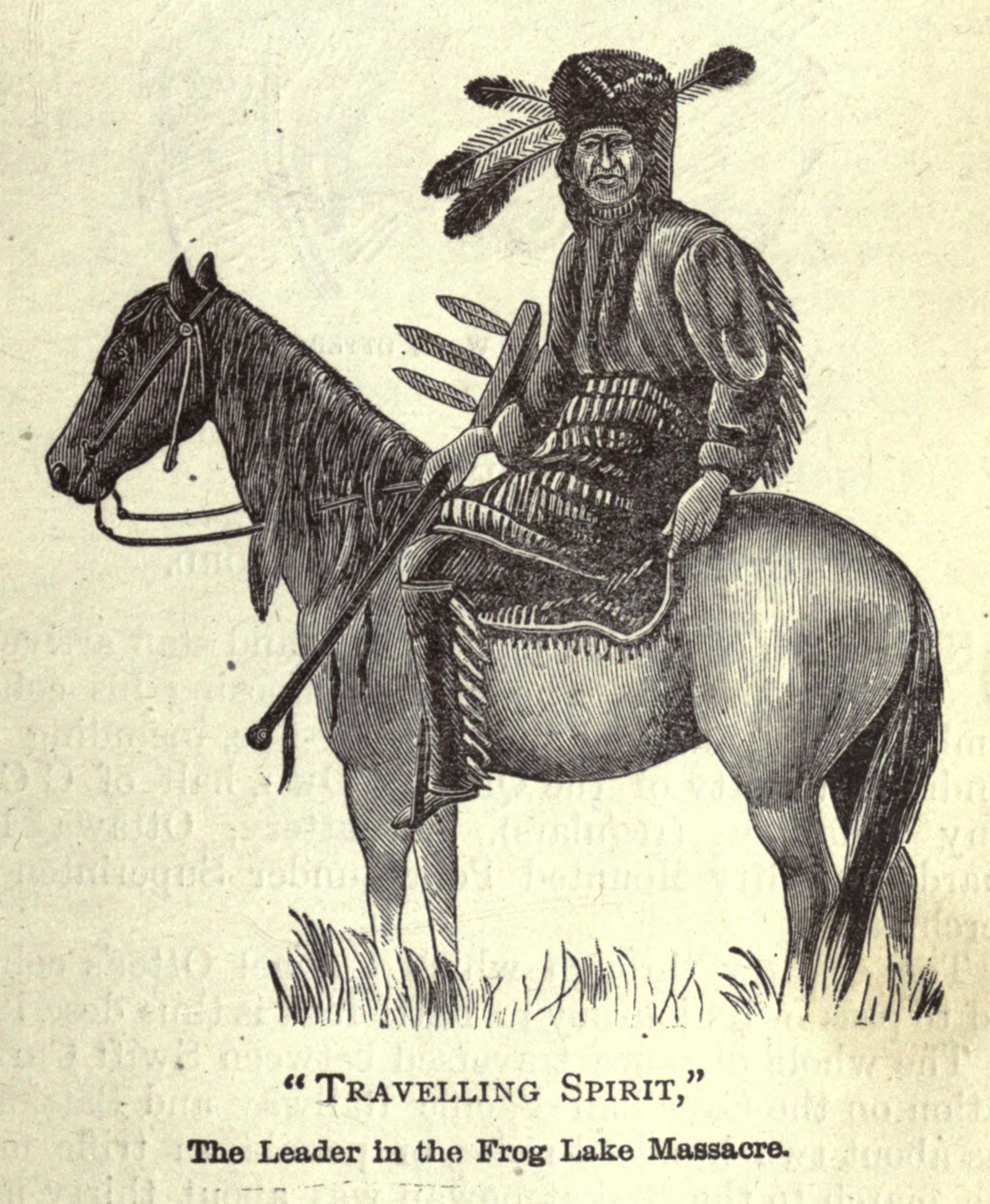
Wandering Spirit in The History of the North-West Rebellion of 1885 by Charles Pelham Mulvany

Wandering Spirit's band was a signatory of Treaty 6

Wandering Spirit (a.k.a. Kapapamahchakwew, Papamahchakwayo, Esprit Errant; b. c. 1845 – d.1885) was a war chief of a band of Plains Cree. There is little information on Wandering Spirit's life. Most of what is known begins shortly before the 1885 Frog Lake Massacre and ends with the Canadian justice system's convicting him of murder and hanging him. However, there is some information regarding his role within the Plains Cree people.

Wandering Spirit was a young war chief among the Plains Cree and frequently came into conflict with the band's titular leader, Chief Big Bear. Whenever Big Bear left the band for a period of time, Wandering Spirit and Big Bear's son, Imasees, were left in command. Both had challenged Big Bear for full leadership in 1885 but were unsuccessful. Wandering Spirit's failed run for leadership left his popularity waning among his supporters, as Big Bear's experience was valued over Wandering Spirit's enthusiasm to punish their oppressors. Aside from the Frog Lake Massacre, Wandering Spirit gained notoriety for his conquests in battle. During his lifetime he participated in many attacks on the Blackfoot warriors and was successful in killing many of them.

== Frog Lake Massacre ==
=== Lead-up ===
The Frog Lake Massacre occurred within a wider context of starvation, ecological change, and political and cultural conflict. During the 1880s, the Plains Cree were suffering from the decline of the buffalo population, which they had traditionally depended on for sustenance. Buffalo were becoming scarce throughout Canada due to overhunting. This created a particular animosity between the Plains Cree and the Métis, who were seen as "half-breeds" infringing upon the Plains Cree's hunting grounds. Another reason for the decline in the buffalo was the introduction of firearms, which combined with the European settlers' demand for buffalo fur robes and pemmican allowed for unsustainable hunting practices. The Plains Cree often trespassed on Blackfoot lands in search of buffalo and blamed any deaths this incurred on the Hudson's Bay Company (HBC), whose trading conquests they felt had forced their hand.

In the absence of buffalo Indigenous groups came to rely on government rations, which were administered by local Indian agents. This was a source of contention. There were instances of insufficient or spoiled rations. Indigenous groups felt that the treaties they had negotiated with the government were not being respected; meanwhile, as the Conservative and Liberal parties grappled for power, they pressured one another to cut expenditures on welfare programs like those out west. Starvation and politics strained the already tense relationships between natives and European traders.

After extensive fighting with the Blackfoot, the Plains Cree were ordered by the Canadian government to relocate to Frog Lake, where they shared the territory with their cousins the Woods Cree. Frog Lake was not a reserve, and Big Bear's band subsisted there with minimal provisions or government assistance.

Indian agents attempted to shepherd them onto a reserve through the denial of rations. The local Indian agent was Thomas Quinn, noted by historians as being "a mean-spirited, petty little man completely lacking in compassion." He once summoned the natives around Frog Lake to the ration house in promise of food only to declare to them that it had been an April Fool's prank and they would receive nothing. Quinn was unpopular with the Plains Cree and Wandering Spirit in particular. After a disagreement, Wandering Spirit had once threatened Quinn by telling him that he "used to enjoy killing a person" and missed the feeling. Following this incident the government recommended that Quinn relocate to Fort Pitt for his own safety. Quinn refused and remained at Frog Lake.

This discontent was instrumental in the massacre. Contrary to Big Bear's attempts at diplomacy, Wandering Spirit favoured a more aggressive resistance strategy that resonated with the warlike members of the band and won him popular support. This culminated in the deaths of nine European traders.

=== Massacre ===
Even though Big Bear was against the attacks, he later served time in jail for not preventing it. It was the war chief, Wandering Spirit, that held the ruling power in the tribe at the time of the attack and he used his position to lead the men into the Frog Lake settlement while Big Bear was away. While historians cannot confirm the reason for Big Bear's absence from his band at the time, the most prolific theory is that he was suffering from alcohol poisoning.

After seeing the success of the Métis in the Battle of Duck Lake, the Cree felt more confident in their ability to combat the Canadian government and seized the opportunity to make their own move against the colonial government.

They hoped to take the people in the Frog Lake settlement as hostages and seize its provisions before going to join the Métis and Louis Riel at Fort Pitt. When the attack on Frog Lake began, they took Thomas Quinn as a hostage in his home because of his status and his cruelty. After allowing the townspeople to attend mass at the church, the Cree men would not let them leave and took them as their hostages inside. When the Cree attempted to move their hostages from the town to the war camp they had set up, Quinn refused to cooperate with them anymore, leading Wandering Spirit to shoot him in the head with his rifle. This resulted in panic among the hostages. Spurred by Wandering Spirit's actions, his warriors massacred eight more unarmed people. With nine of their hostages dead, the Cree men took the remaining settlers with them as their prisoners.

The Cree took their hostages to the war camp that they had set up outside of the settlement before the battle began. The hostages were warned that they would be safe so long as they remained inside the camp, but that everyone found outside would be considered an enemy.

Big Bear had been eating breakfast with the wife of the manager of the HBC when he heard the news, but immediately returned to his band to put an end to the violence. He moved the tribe further north in hopes of isolating the group from further violence.

== Capture of Fort Pitt ==
Wandering Spirit resolved to capture Fort Pitt two weeks following the Frog Lake Massacre. The fort contained provisions and ammunition, which appealed to the starving Cree. The conquest was also supported by Louis Riel, as Fort Pitt housed a North-West Mounted Police (NWMP) detachment that could prove to be a threat during a rebellion.

It was a brief and almost bloodless conflict. After Corporal David Cowan was shot and killed, Fort Pitt was surrendered to the Cree.

The death of an NWMP officer caused an uproar. Settlers projected anxieties of another Riel conspiracy onto the Cree, who were depicted in newspapers like the Saskatchewan Herald as villainous. Wandering Spirit, however, insisted that the Cree had only been reacting against starvation and that there was no larger plot at hand. During this time, Wandering Spirit's band followed him out of a sense of crisis but generally abhorred the violence.

The band retreated north with their stolen supplies. They were pursued by law enforcement, and after several months Wandering Spirit was cornered. He surrendered and attempted suicide by stabbing himself in the chest, but only pierced a lung. He was taken into custody.

== Trial ==
After Wandering Spirit was captured, he was held in custody until the trial took place at Battleford. The trial was overseen by the Magistrate Charles Rouleau. Around the same time as the Frog Lake Massacre, Rouleau received a telegram informing him that his home had been burned down by the Cree during the Looting of Battleford. At this time several other Indigenous men such as Little Bear (Apaschiskoos), Walking the Sky (a.k.a. Round the Sky), Bad Arrow, and Miserable Man, Iron Body, Ika (a.k.a. Crooked leg), and Man Without Blood were also facing charges. They were put on trial for the murders committed during the Frog Lake Massacre. Throughout Wandering Spirit's trial, he spoke freely about his actions regarding both the Frog Lake Massacre and the capture of Fort Pitt. This was an admission of guilt so that he could clear his conscience and have assurances for his afterlife. However, Wandering Spirit was not permitted access to legal counsel during this time. Additionally, the trials were held in English which prevented many of the accused from defending themselves against the charges. Aside from legal matters, the majority of Wandering Spirit's communications were with missionaries, who often encouraged Indigenous people, such as Wandering Spirit and the other men who were held prisoner, to plead guilty regardless of whether they committed the crime or not. Originally Wandering Spirit refused to speak to the missionaries up until he had a "spiritual awakening" prior to his execution. It was at this point that Wandering Spirit was baptized.

Even though Wandering Spirit did plead guilty to the charges laid against him, he insisted that he only played a minor role in the uprising, as he felt immense guilt for the role he had played in both the Frog Lake Massacre and the death of Thomas Quinn. He even said that he "fought against it, Imasees nor the others would let [him] go." On September 22, after confessing to shooting Thomas Quinn in the head at point-blank range. Wandering Spirit was sentenced to hang by Rouleau. Rouleau described Wandering Spirit as "the greatest killer ever to walk on two legs in America." In many ways the use of the death penalty in Wandering Spirit's trial was seen as a way for the government to reassert its dominance over the land and its occupants during times of civil unrest.

== Death ==
The Canadian government hoped to make an example of Wandering Spirit and his men to discourage future uprisings by Indigenous peoples. Sir John A. Macdonald said on the hanging that "we must vindicate the position of the white man; we must teach the Indians what law is." The plan was for the eight men to be hanged two at a time, but it was later decided that all eight would be hanged together.

On November 27, 1885, Wandering Spirit was executed as part of the 1885 hangings at Battleford, which holds the record for Canada's largest mass execution. Wandering Spirit had said that he wished his death alone could atone for his acts, as he was saddened that seven others had to die with him. A myth circulated that Wandering Spirit sang a love song to his wife as he was hanged. However, there are no reputable sources that substantiate this claim. Sources do indicate that Wandering Spirit appeared stoic during the hanging, while the other men were singing death chants.

Wandering Spirit's body was interred in a mass grave in Battleford along with the other men hanged at Battleford in 1885. Originally unmarked, a tombstone with the names of the eight men buried there was erected in December 1985 to mark the 100th anniversary by the North West Centennial Advisory Committee and Battleford City Council, with both groups splitting the costs along with a grant from the Provincial Department of Culture and Recreation.

== Legacy ==
In 1976, Pauline Shirt and Vern Harper established Wandering Spirit Survival School in Toronto. The school began meeting in the Harper-Shirt household's living room in the Bain Co-op with a handful of children and soon outgrew the space. They moved temporarily into the Native Canadian Centre's second-floor rooms before finding a suitable space and being designated an alternative school. The school was named for Wandering Spirit, who was Shirt's great-grandfather. In 1983 the school was renamed First Nations School of Toronto. The National Film Board of Canada made a documentary about the school in 1978. In February 2019, the school was renamed Kapapamahchakwew–Wandering Spirit School. Wandering Spirit's great-great-granddaughter was the head female dancer at the rededication ceremony.

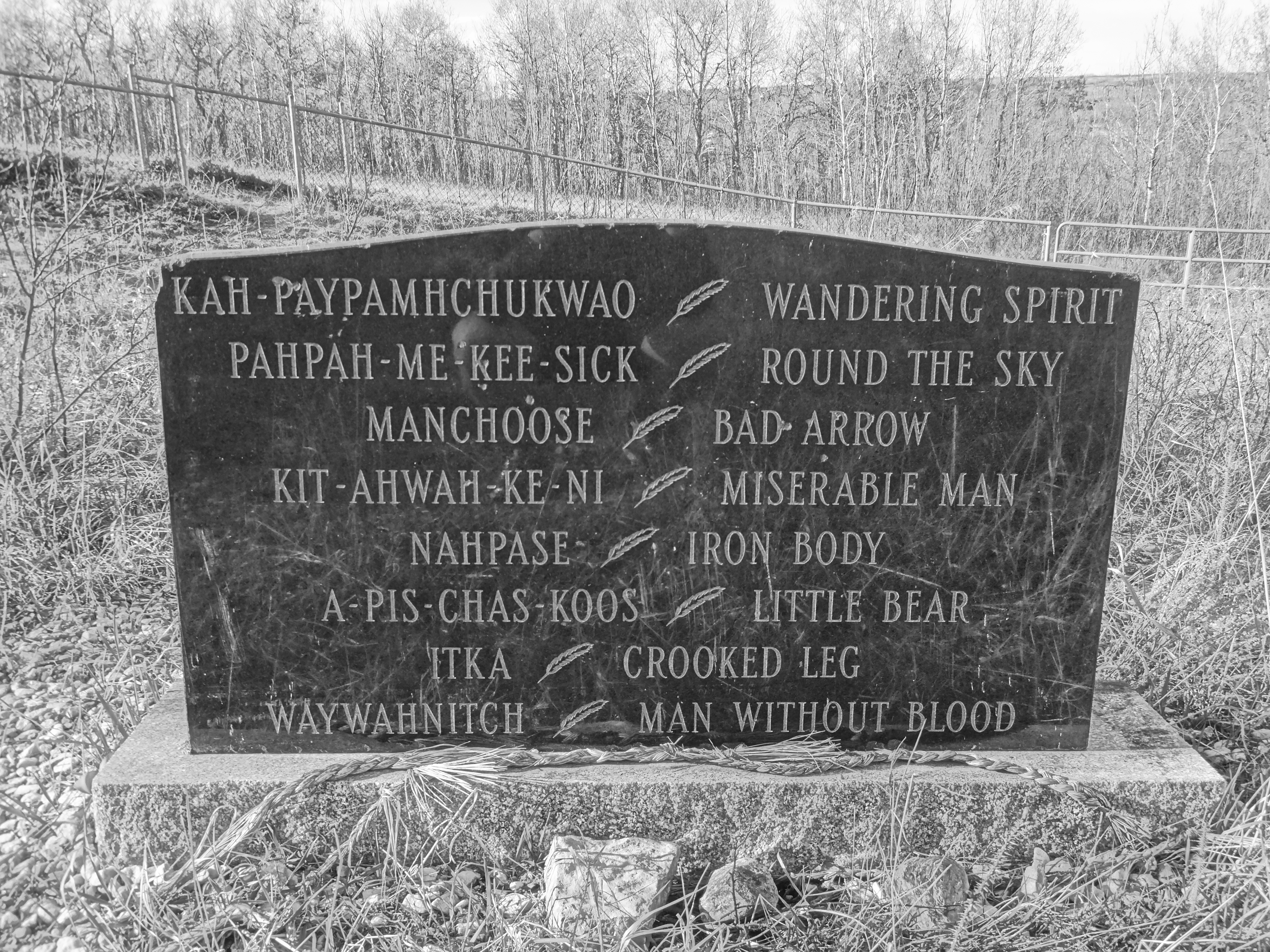
Headstone marking the mass grave

In 1985, a tombstone with the names of the eight men executed at Battleford was erected by the North West Centennial Advisory Committee (NWCAC) and Battleford City council to mark the 100th anniversary of the execution. In attendance were Culture and Recreation Minister Rick Folk, Chief Lawrence of Poundmaker Cree Nation, NWCAC member Gordon Tootoosis and Harvey Johnson, who was the Director of the NWCAC. Chairman of the NWCAC Irwin McInstosh said, "This mass grave commemoration is the last historical date of any significance in the North West Rebellion." Rich Folk added, "We are not here to pass judgement on the Indian people who lie buried here in this mass grave, that was done 100 years earlier when they were arraigned for acts of violence during the Rebellion but, this gravesite marker will serve as a call to peace and a reminder that violence and war is never the solution." A sign and permanent teepee were added in the same year.

In 2013, the gravesite was vandalized. Ray Fox, the groundskeeper, said, "I'm just saying we need to talk about these kinds of things because this is not pretty, as you can see, when you're looking at this gravestone and it's been deliberately pushed over and our teepee structure here that we erected as a memorial to these warriors is strung all over this place in this piece of property. That's not respect." He added that whether or not someone agrees with what the men did, their final resting place should be respected.
