= North Battleford (disambiguation) =

North Battleford may refer to:

- Rural Municipality of North Battleford No. 437, Saskatchewan, Canada
  - North Battleford, Saskatchewan, Canada
- North Battleford Crown Colony, Saskatchewan, Canada; an unincorporated community
- North Battleford Comprehensive High School, in North Battleford, Saskatchewan, Canada
- North Battleford Energy Centre, natural gas power station in Saskatchewan, Canada
- North Battleford railway station, North Battleford, Saskatchewan, Canada
- North Battleford Airport (IATA: YQW; ICAO: CYQW) formerly the RCAF Station North Battleford
- North Battleford/Hamlin Airport (TC: CJD4) former airport in Saskatchewan, Canada
- North Battleford (electoral district) (1917–1949) former federal riding in Saskatchewan, Canada
- North Battleford (provincial electoral district) former provincial riding in Saskatchewan, Canada

== See also ==
- Battleford (disambiguation)
