= Frog Lake, Alberta =

Frog Lake
- Indigenous community
- Location of Frog Lake in Alberta
- Coordinates: 53°49′54″N 110°25′00″W
- Country: Canada
- Province: Alberta
- Region: Northern Alberta
- Census division: 12
- Municipal district: County of St. Paul No. 19

Government
  - Type: Unincorporated
- Elevation: 593 m (1,946 ft)
- Time zone: UTC−06:00 (Alberta Time)
- Postal code: T0A 1M0
- Area code: +1-780
- Highways: Highway 897
- Waterways: Frog Lake

Frog Lake is a Cree community of Frog Lake First Nation approximately 207 km (129 mi) east of Edmonton, Alberta, Canada. It is located 11 km (6.8 mi) northeast of the hamlet of Heinsburg and 13 km (8.1 mi) southwest of the Fishing Lake Metis Settlement.

Frog Lake has 2,454 band members as of August, 2007. Frog Lake has a reserve population of approximately 1,000 residing on-reserve.

== History ==
Frog Lake was the scene of the Frog Lake Massacre of which nine white men were killed by Cree Indigenous people on April 2, 1885, in the course of the North-West Rebellion.
