= Government House (Battleford) =

Historic site in Saskatchewan, Canada

Coordinates: 52.7113°N 108.3085°W

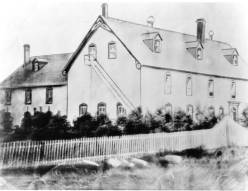
Government House of the Northwest Territories in Battleford (in present-day Saskatchewan), Canada.

Government House in Battleford, Saskatchewan served as the seat for the government of the Northwest Territories between 1878 and 1883 (the area that now makes up Saskatchewan was part of the Northwest Territories until the province was created in 1905).

Originally a two-storey Carpenter Gothic wood structure designed by architect Thomas S. Scott, it was altered with Mansard roof that gave the building a third floor and expanded into a 3 floor complex.

The building was constructed in 1877 but used for a short time for government administration centre. From 1883 to 1984 several institutions call the building their home:

- Battleford Industrial School 1883 to 1914
- Seventh Day Adventist Academy from 1914 to 1931
- Oblates of St. Mary's House of Studies (boarding school and seminary) from 1932 to 1972; St. Mary's owned the building until 1984.
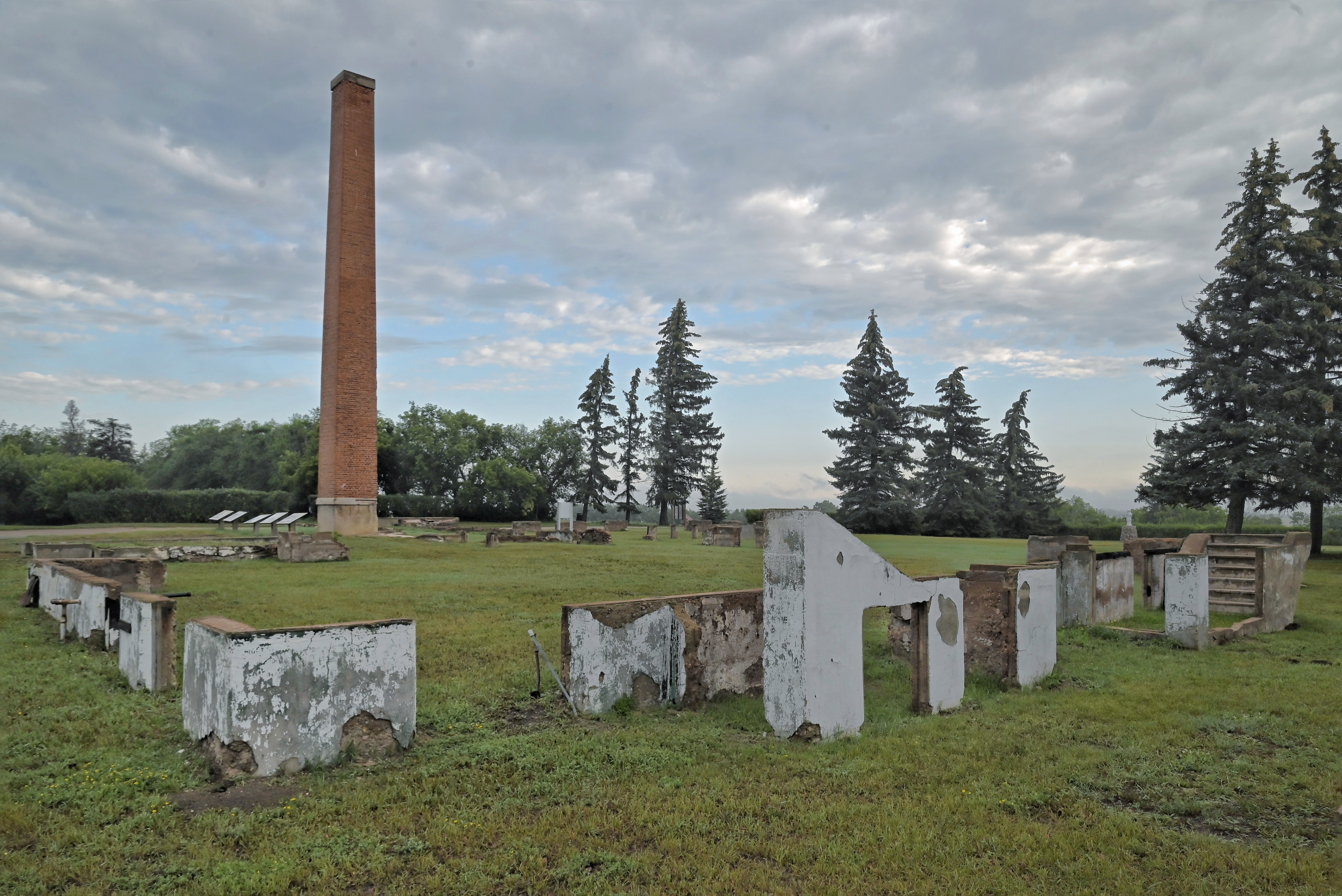
  Remains of Government House in 2022.

The site was designated a National Historic Site of Canada in 1973.

The structure was destroyed by fire in 2003. Today only parts of the buildings foundation and the chimney remains.
