= Fort Battleford =

Historical fort in Saskatchewan, Canada

Coordinates: 52°43′38″N 108°17′46″W

- At the confluence of the North Saskatchewan and the Battle rivers in Battleford, Saskatchewan, Canada
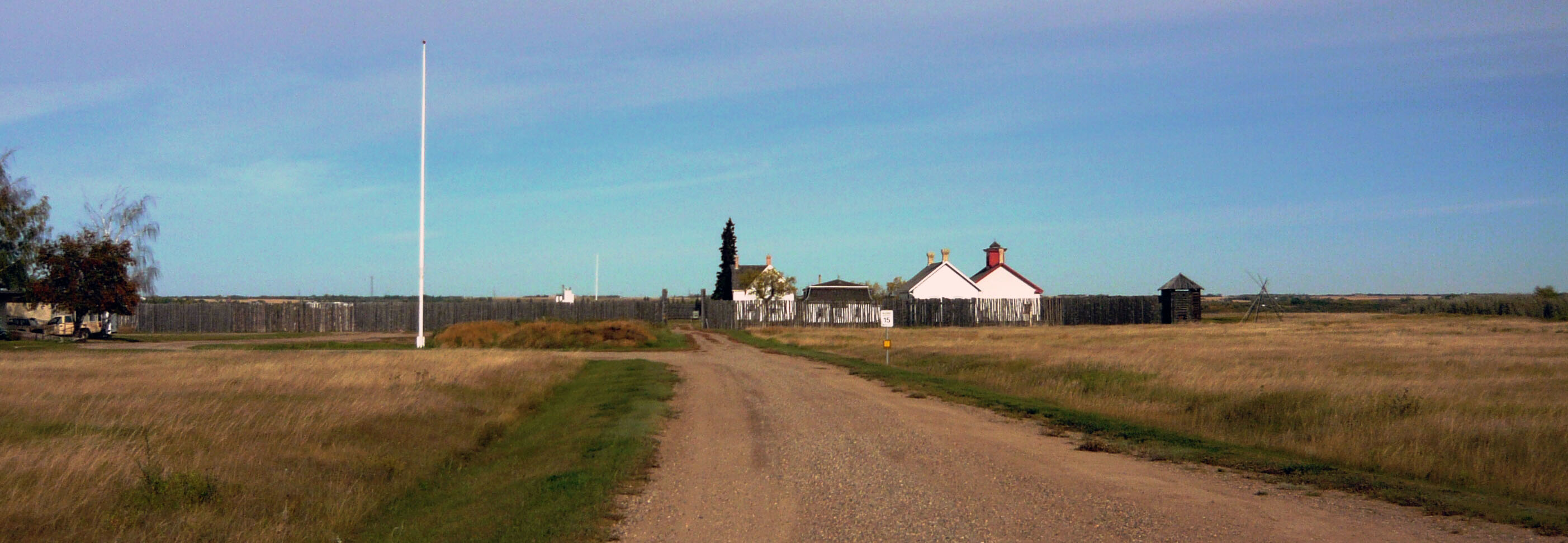
- Fort Battleford National Historic Site

Site information
- Type: Fort
- Controlled by: Canada

Site history
- Built: 1876
- In use: 1876-1924
- Materials: Wood
- Battles/wars: North-West Rebellion

National Historic Site of Canada
- Official name: Fort Battleford National Historic Site of Canada
- Designated: 1923

Garrison information
- Garrison: North-West Mounted Police

Fort Battleford was the sixth North-West Mounted Police fort to be established in the North-West Territories of Canada, and played a central role in the events of the North-West Rebellion of 1885. It was here Chief Poundmaker was arrested, and where six Cree and two Stoney men were hanged for murders committed in the Frog Lake Massacre and the Looting of Battleford.

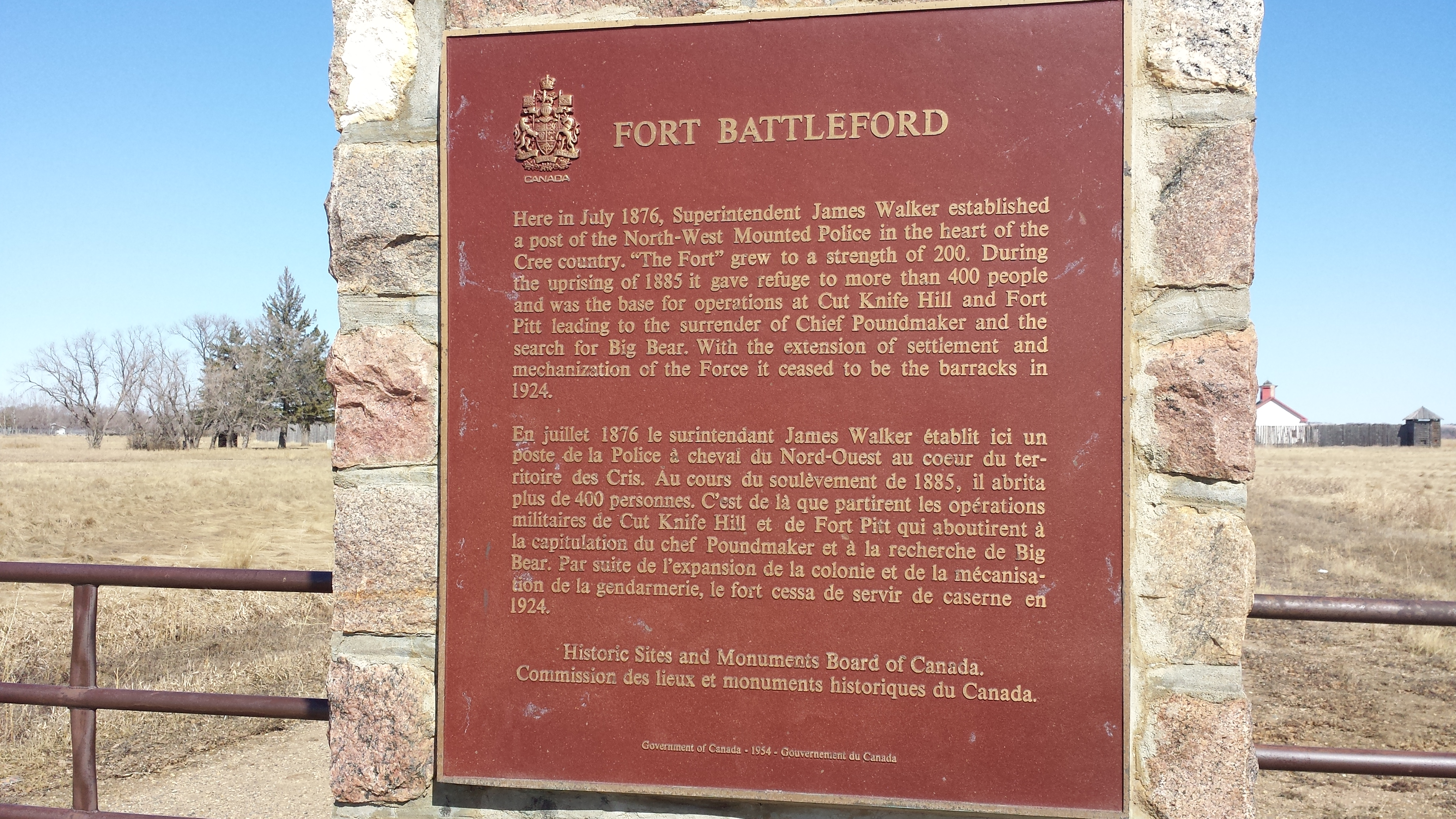
Fort Battleford

Its location near the confluence of the North Saskatchewan and the Battle rivers offered access to fresh water, as it was many years before an on-site well was made available; and offered an alternative means of transportation to the Red River cart. As the site was on a plateau, the fort was easily defensible, and offered clear lines of sight for the surrounding area and to Government Ridge – thus providing warning against possible attacks. The fort sheltered around 500 people, and it helped protect the settlement of Battleford.

Battleford was the capital of the North-West Territories and that played a substantial role in the decision to locate the fort there. The government's believed the presence of the NWMP would act as a civilizing influence on the First Nations in the area and would help them to transition from their nomadic lifestyle to a stationary one modelled on European societies. It also hoped the NWMP would assist settlers in their homesteading efforts and that their presence in the area would encourage the people to respect the law.

The difficulties that had plagued Native American–government relations in the United States, along with the high Aboriginal population in the Battleford area, prompted the federal government to establish a strong NWMP presence. Both the Canadian government and the First Nations were quite aware of what had transpired south of the "Medicine Line" and sought to follow a different path.

Originally, the Canadian Pacific Railway route was planned to pass through Battleford, along the Qu'Appelle route, but the railway was eventually built on a southerly route. This resulted in the capital of the North-West Territories moving from Battleford to Regina, which was then known as Pile of Bones.

== Legacy ==
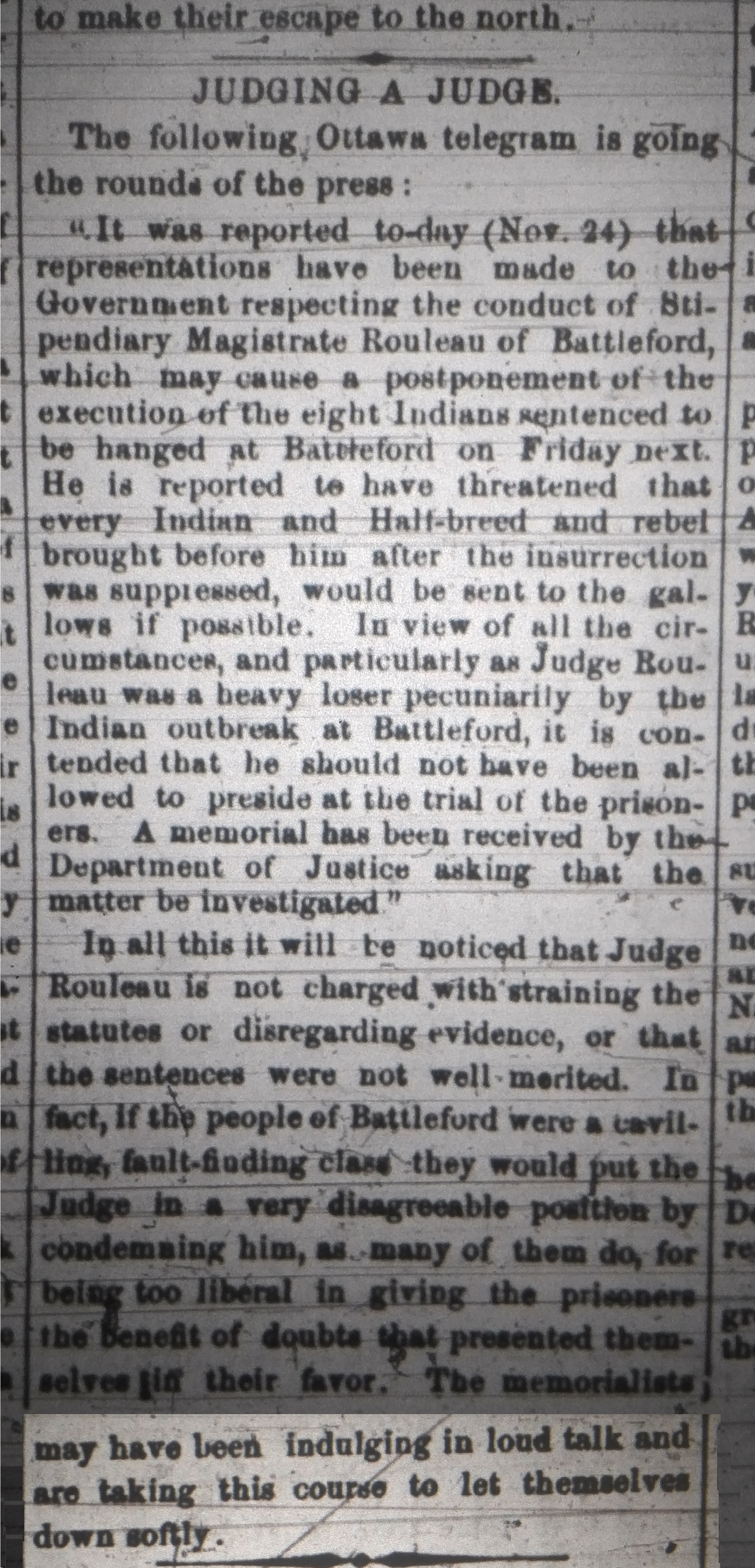
A newspaper clipping from December 1885, which closely followed the hangings, suggests that Judge Charles Rouleau, who heard the case, was biased

In the spring of 2008, Tourism, Parks, Culture and Sport Minister Christine Tell proclaimed in Duck Lake that "the 125th commemoration, in 2010, of the 1885 Northwest Resistance is an excellent opportunity to tell the story of the prairie Métis and First Nations peoples' struggle with Government forces and how it has shaped Canada today."

Fort Otter was built during the Rebellion, on the site of Battleford's government house located at the capital of the North-West Territories (1876 and 1883). The largest Canadian mass hanging occurred here when eight First Nations men were executed for murders they committed during the Frog Lake Massacre and the looting of Battleford.

The fort was designated a national historic site of Canada in 1923 and became known as the Fort Battleford National Historic Site. This commemorated its role as military base of operations for battles of Cut Knife Hill and Fort Pitt, as a refuge for 500 area settlers, and for its role in the lifting of the Siege of Battleford.
