= Battleford Court House =

Historic building in Saskatchewan, Canada

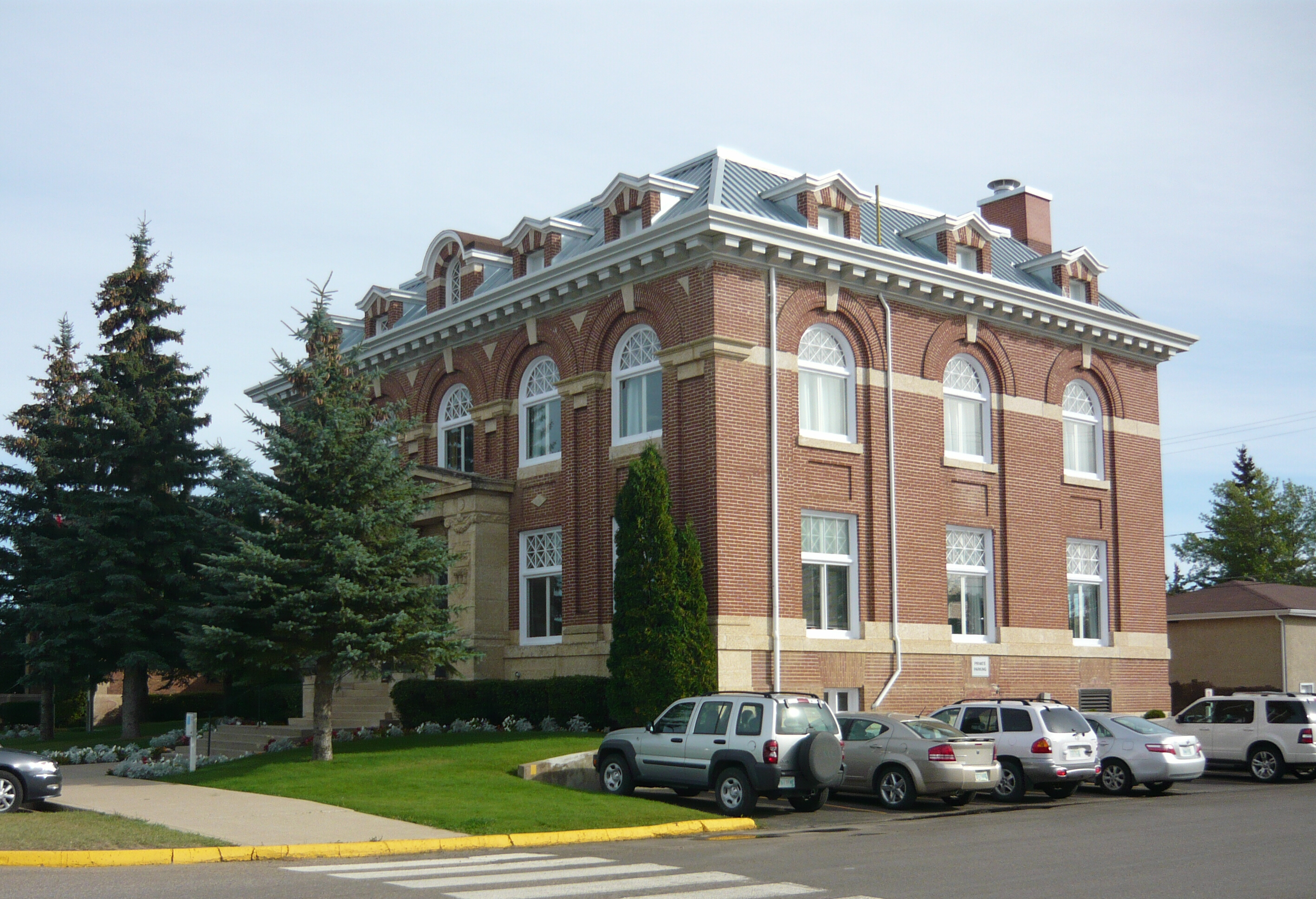
- Interactive map of Battleford Court House
- Location: Battleford, Saskatchewan, Canada
- Coordinates: 52°44′12.66″N 108°18′41.15″W
- Established: 1907

National Historic Site of Canada
- Official name: Battleford Court House National Historic Site of Canada
- Designated: 1981

Battleford Court House is the facility located in Battleford to provide a public forum used by the Saskatchewan legal system to adjudicate disputes and dispense civil, labour, administrative and criminal justice under its laws.

== History ==
In 1785, a fur trading post was built at Battleford. The Dominion government acquired the North-West the Hudson's Bay Company in 1870, and in 1873, created the North-West Mounted Police to maintain law and order. In 1876 Fort Battleford was established, a North-West Mounted Police post. Shortly thereafter, in 1877 the capital of the North West Territories moved from Fort Pitt to Battleford. In 1883 the capital of the North West Territories moved again, this time to Regina. In 1886 the Supreme Court of the North-West Territories with five puisne judges was established and resided in Regina. The original Provincial Regina Supreme Court House was constructed in 1895 and replaced in 1965. Saskatchewan became a province in 1905. The Judicature Act, 1907, established the Supreme Court of Saskatchewan. The Battleford Court House was designed by the architectural firm of Storey and Van Egmond, and constructed in 1907, marking the end of the old territorial court system.

The Canadian Northern Railway was built north of the North Saskatchewan River creating a rapidly growing community of North Battleford. Battleford was no longer the capital of the NWT, nor centre of law and order through the post at Fort Battleford. Battleford Court House is still the oldest court house in Saskatchewan and received Provincial Heritage Property status in 1978. The court house still has sittings of the Court of Queen's Bench.

The building was designated a National Historic Site of Canada in 1981.

Saskatchewan Provincial Archives keeps the historical records of court proceedings.

== Nearby ==
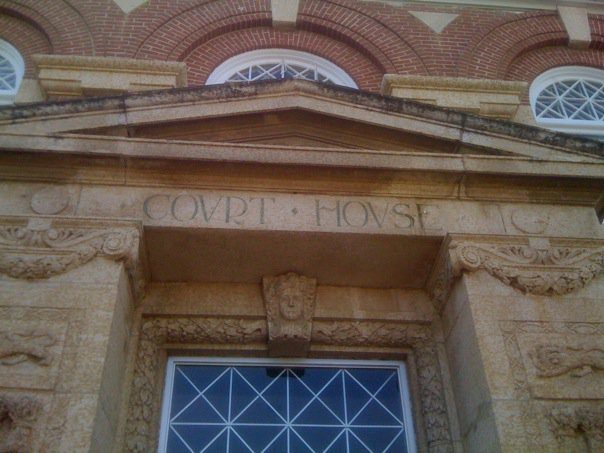
Doorway detail

- The Old Government House
- Queen's Hotel
- Land Titles (Registry) Office
- Battleford Post Office
- Town Hall/Opera House
- 1911 CNR Railway Station
- 1913 Hot Carl Commissioner
- The Presbyterian Gardiner Church
- St. Vital RC Church
- The Merchants Bank of Canada
- Fred Light Museum

== See also ==
- History of Saskatchewan Courts
