= Charles Rouleau =

Canadian politician

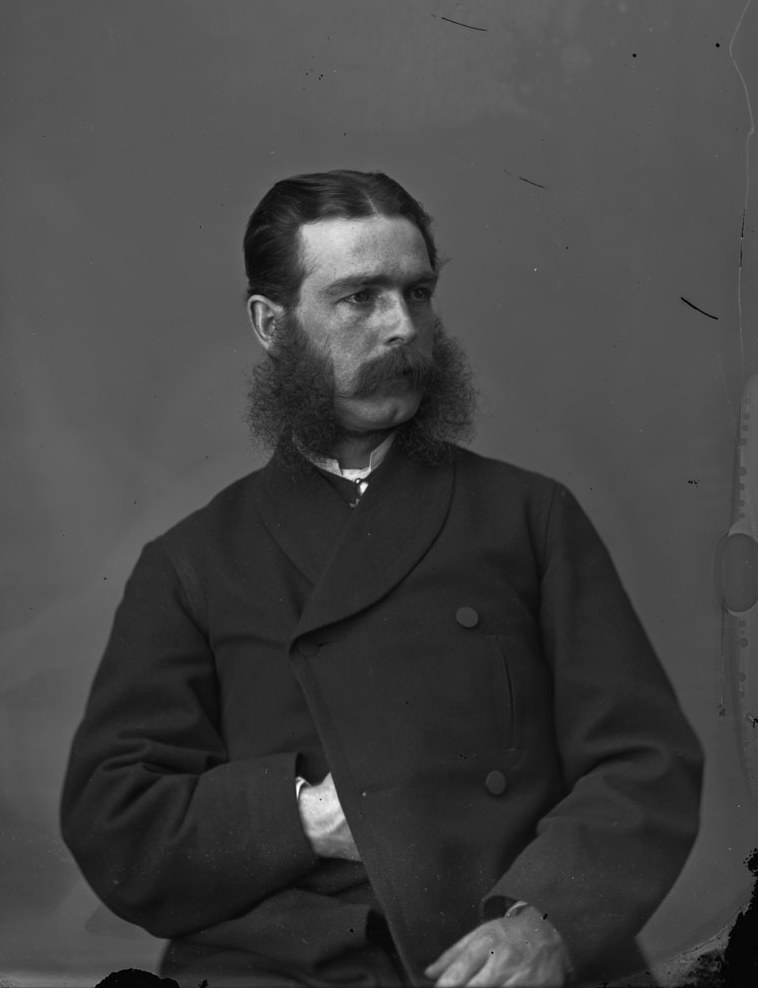
Charles Borromée Rouleau (1868)

Charles Borromée Rouleau (born: December 16, 1840 L'Isle Verte, Lower Canada- died: August 25, 1901 Rouleauville, North-West Territories) was a 19th-century Canadian politician, lawyer, judge and writer. He served as stipendiary magistrate and justice of the Supreme Court of the North-West Territories, as well as legal advisor to the Northwest Territories Legislature.

== Early life ==
Rouleau began his legal career when he was called to the bar in Quebec on December 16, 1868. He later became an inspector for the Ottawa and Pontiac Counties Catholic School Districts.

Rouleau first ran for public office on the municipal level in the County of Ottawa in 1874. He was unsuccessful.

== Legal career ==
Rouleau then made his career through political appointments as magistrate and judge at increasingly higher levels of the justice system. On July 12, 1876, he was appointed district magistrate in Ottawa County and held that position until 1883.

On September 28, 1883, Rouleau was appointed to the North-West Territories Council where he replaced Matthew Ryan. He served his first term on the council with the title of stipendiary magistrate. The NWT then included what later was split off to make modern-day Yukon, Alberta, Saskatchewan and Nunavut.

In 1885 during the North-West Rebellion his home in Battleford was looted and burned.

Later in 1885 he presided over the murder trials of several Indigenous men, 11 of whom he convicted and 8 were hanged.

On February 18, 1888, Rouleau vacated that position to accept an appointment to the Supreme Court of the North-West Territories, where he sat for cases in the Northern Alberta District. After the 1888 North-West Territories general election, Lieutenant Governor Joseph Royal reappointed Rouleau as legal advisor to the North-West Territories Legislature. He held that position until dissolution of the legislature in 1891.

With his appointment to the Supreme Court, Rouleau moved just outside Calgary to a mission parish there, which had been founded by French-Canadian priests in the 1870s. There he and his brother founded Rouleauville, which they intended to be a French-speaking community. The village was later annexed by Calgary and was renamed the Mission District. Rouleau's house, built before 1896, stood until 1940, when it was replaced by an apartment building.

Rouleau was on the Council when an 1892 assembly vote made English the only official language in the territories. French was reintroduced as an official language in the late 1980s. (By that time, the provinces of Alberta and Saskatchewan had been carved out of the NWT.) By the Northwest Territories' Official Languages Act (1988), nine native languages were also recognized as official for certain purposes, including in the territorial court.

== Frog Lake trial ==
Rouleau, in his capacity of stipendiary magistrate, tried the case of Wandering Spirit, (Kapapamahchakwew) a Plains Cree war chief, and others for the murders committed during the Frog Lake Massacre and at Battleford (the murders of farm instructor Payne and Battleford farmer Barney Tremont).

Wandering Spirit, a Plains Cree war chief, Little Bear (Apaschiskoos), Walking the Sky (also known as Round the Sky), Bad Arrow, Miserable Man, Iron Body, Ika (also known as Crooked Leg) and Man Without Blood were tried for the murders. None of the accused were allowed legal counsel, and Rouleau sentenced each of them to death by hanging. He sentenced three others to hang as well, but their death sentences were commuted.

Minister of Justice John Sparrow David Thompson reviewed the cases but mitigating circumstances were not taken into account, and in retrospect, justice seems to have been arbitrarily dispensed.

Eight Indigenous men, including Wandering Spirit, were hanged on November 27, 1885, in the largest mass hanging in Canada's history.

== See also ==
- Rouleau, Saskatchewan
