= Frog Lake Massacre =

Massacre during the North-West Rebellion in Canada

- Part of North-West Rebellion
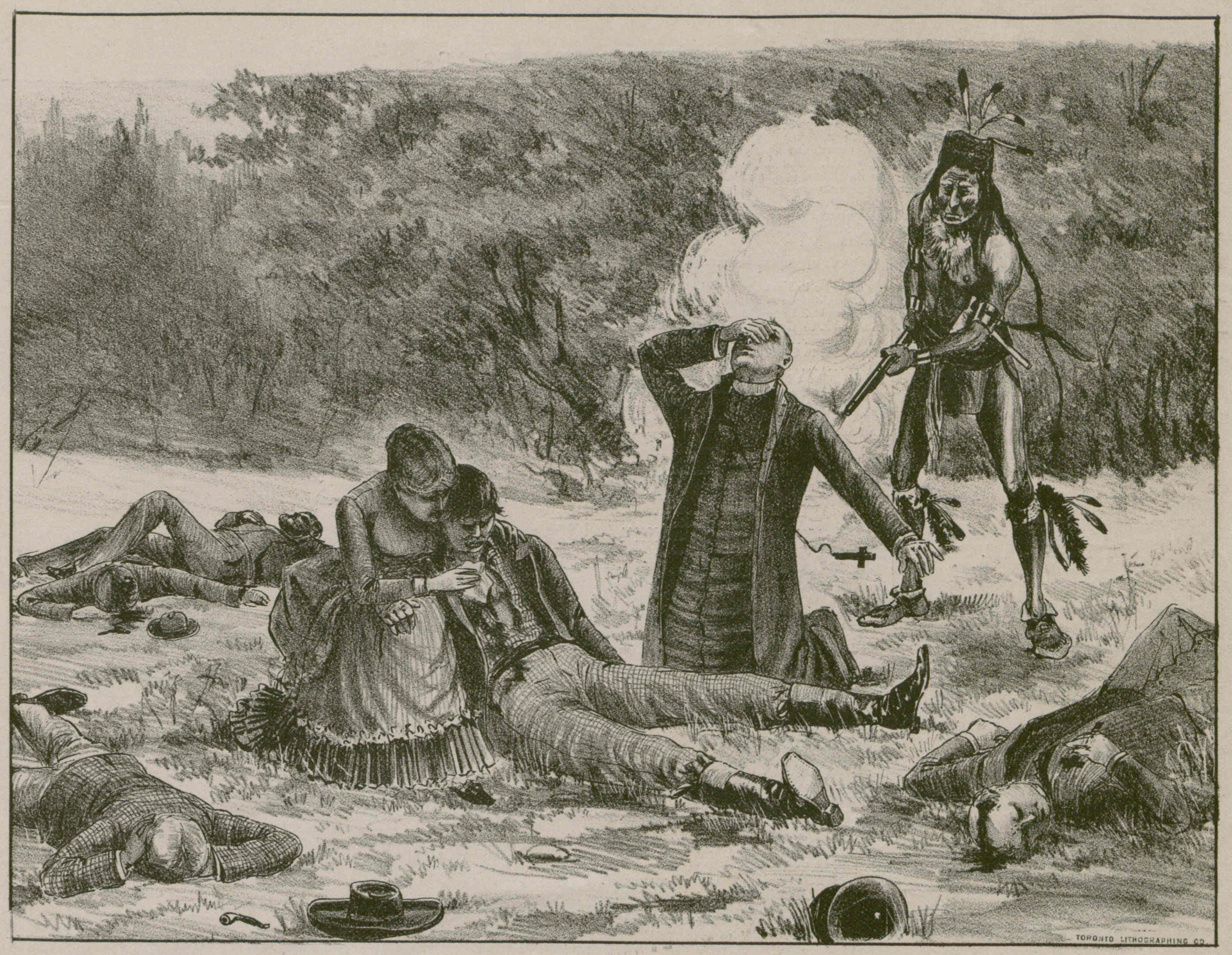
- Murder of the priests Léon Fafard and Félix Marchand at Frog Lake
- Location: 53.831186°N 110.358696°W; Frog Lake, Alberta
- Date: April 2, 1885; 11:00 am
- Target: Residents of Frog Lake
- Attack type: Massacre
- Deaths: 9
- Perpetrator: Cree warriors led by Wandering Spirit

The District of Saskatchewan in 1885 (within the black diamonds) included the central section of Saskatchewan and extended into Alberta and Manitoba.

The Frog Lake Massacre was part of the Cree uprising during the North-West Rebellion in western Canada. Led by Wandering Spirit, Cree men attacked and killed nine officials, clergy and settlers in the small settlement of Frog Lake, at the time in the District of Saskatchewan in the North-West Territories on April 2, 1885. (The location, about 200 km east of Edmonton, is now within the province of Alberta.)

== Causes ==
Chief Big Bear and his band had settled near Frog Lake in late 1884. He had signed Treaty 6 in 1882 and been pushed to move his band near Fort Pitt, located about 55 km (34 mi) from Frog Lake, but had not yet selected a reserve site. Angered by what he saw as an unfair treaty and by the dwindling buffalo population and the subsequent enforced starvation of the Cree people, Big Bear began organizing the Cree for resistance.

On March 28 the Indigenous people living at Frog Lake learned of the Métis victory at the Battle of Duck Lake two days before and of Poundmaker's looting of Battleford. Hearing a rumour that a war had started and Canadian soldiers were coming to Frog Lake to kill Indigenous people there, Wandering Spirit took on the post of war chief of Big Bear's band. He began a campaign to gather arms, ammunition and food supplies in preparation for establishing a defended camp. The largest local source of supplies were the government stables, the Hudson's Bay Company post and George Dill's store at Frog Lake. Indian Agent Thomas Quinn, as an official of the Canadian government, was seen to be protecting the supplies and therefore an obstacle to Wandering Spirit's aims.

Meanwhile, Cree in the area were angry at Quinn because he had control of the inadequate rations that kept the Cree in a state of near-starvation. But the attacks that occurred were perpetrated by several members of Big Bear's band, which had moved into the area not long before, not the local Cree.

== Massacre ==
A group of armed Cree men led by the war chief Wandering Spirit took Thomas Quinn hostage in his home in the early morning of April 2. The Cree then took control of the community, looting various stores and eating food.

Many of the white settlers in the settlement attended the local Catholic church, where two priests conducted mass with Natives attending. After mass concluded, at around 11:00 a.m., Wandering Spirit ordered the whites to move to a Native encampment a couple of kilometres away.

Quinn repeatedly said he would not be moved; in response, Wandering Spirit shot him in the head. After that, despite Big Bear's attempt to stop the shootings, Wandering Spirit's group then killed another eight unarmed people: the two Catholic priests, Leon Fafard and Felix Marchand, Fafard's lay assistant John Williscroft, as well as John Gowanlock, John Delaney, William Gilchrist, George Dill, and Charles Gouin.

A Hudson's Bay Company clerk, William Bleasdell Cameron, who had been made to go to the church, after mass had gone to the Hudson's Bay shop to fill an order made by Quinn for Miserable Man. When the first shots were fired, he escaped with the help of sympathetic Cree, and made his way to a nearby Wood Cree camp, where the chief protected him.

After the nine people were killed, Wandering Spirit's men took captive the surviving whites and government loyalists in the community. The hostages numbered about 70 and included Theresa Gowanlock and Theresa Delaney, wives of two of the slain men, and their children, as well as William Carmeron and several Métis men: John Pritchard, Pierre Blondin, Dolphus Nolin, and Louis Goulet, and others. Pritchard and another Metis man ransomed the two widows for two horses each and put them under Pritchard's protection, to which they possibly owed their lives. The two Theresas later wrote a book on their experience: Two Months in the Camp of Big Bear. William Cameron's book Blood Red the Sun also gives an account of the killings and their aftermath.

Henry Ross Halpin, a long-serving HBC official, was at Frog Lake that day. He became one of the hostages and was held for six weeks, during part of which he acted as Big Bear's secretary. He later spoke in defence of Big Bear.

== Aftermath ==
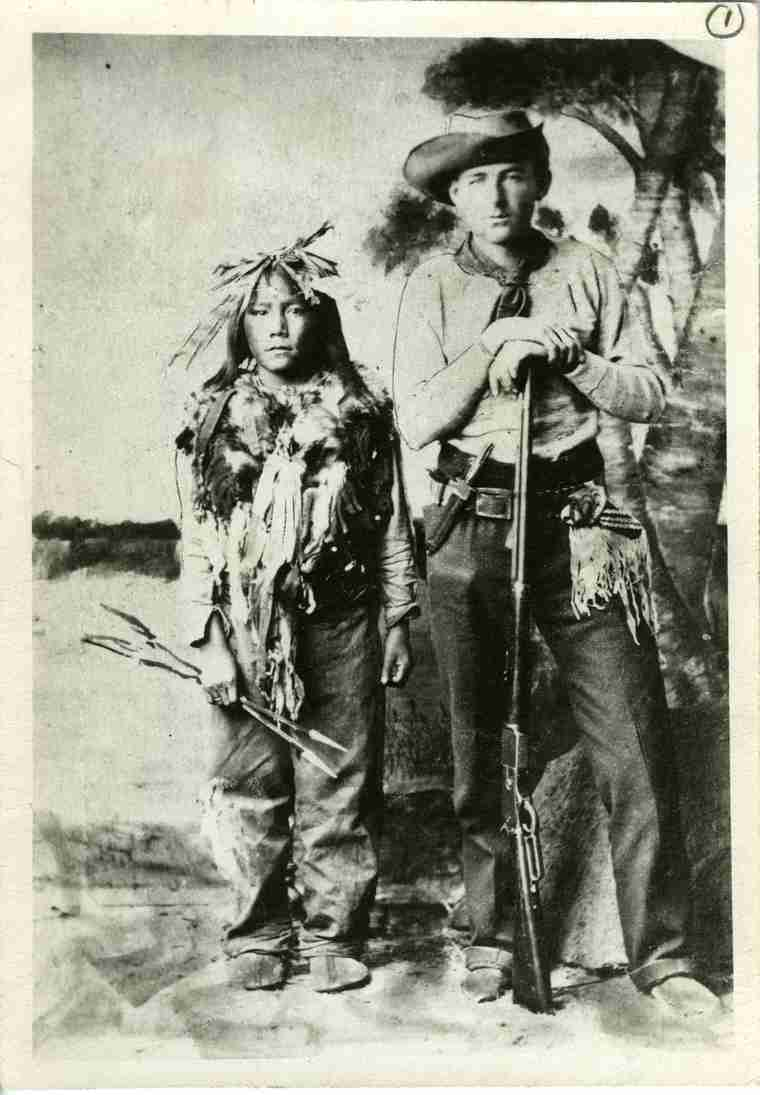
Survivor William Bleasdell Cameron with Horse Child, 12-year-old son of Big Bear. They were photographed together in Regina in 1885 during the trial of Big Bear. Cameron testified in Big Bear's defence.

After the massacre, several of the Métis residents who were now captive hurriedly placed the bodies of Fafard, Marchand, Delaney and Gowanlock in the cellar under the church. At great risk, they also moved the bodies of Quinn and Gouin into the cellar of a house near where they were killed. However, they were refused permission to touch the other victims.

Two days after the killings, the church, the rectory and all the buildings of the Frog Lake settlement were burned on April 4, 1885 (the day before Easter). All that remained of the mission was the bell tower and the cemetery.

In the days following April 2, Wandering Spirit's followers moved on to Fort Pitt.

The Frog Lake incident, along with the Métis rebellion at the same time, prompted the Canadian government to send troops and police to the area. On June 14 the Midland Battalion (the advance guard of Major-General Thomas Bland Strange's Alberta Field Force) arrived and buried the victims of the massacre in the cemetery. During their occupation the bell hanging in the fire-blackened bell tower was taken. (Later the bell, displayed prominently in the Legion hall at Midland, Ontario, was confused with the bell of Batoche. Taken from there in 1991, it was found in Métis hands in 2013.)

The Alberta Field Force then pursued Big Bear's band, accompanied by its hostages, fighting them at Frenchman's Butte.

When the rebellion was put down and law and order restored, Wandering Spirit, the war chief responsible for the Frog Lake incident, walked to Fort Pitt where he turned himself in.

Wandering Spirit (Kapapamahchakwew), a Plains Cree war chief, Little Bear (Apaschiskoos), Walking the Sky (A.K.A. Round the Sky), Bad Arrow, Miserable Man, Iron Body, Ika (A.K.A. Crooked Leg) and Man Without Blood were put on trial for murders committed during the Frog Lake Massacre and at Battleford (the murders of Farm instructor Payne and Battleford farmer Barney Tremont). None of the accused were allowed legal counsel, and Judge Charles Rouleau sentenced each of them to death by hanging. He sentenced three others to hang as well, but their death sentences were commuted.

Sentenced to be hanged and perhaps in an attempt to expiate his offences, Wandering Spirit attempted suicide but lived to be hanged.

Wandering Spirit and the seven others were hanged on November 27, 1885, in the largest mass hanging in Canada's history.

Although Big Bear had opposed the attack, he was charged with treason because of his efforts to organize resistance among the Cree. He was convicted and sentenced to three years in the Manitoba Penitentiary. He served about half the prison term then was released, to die a short time later, in 1888.

== Legacy ==
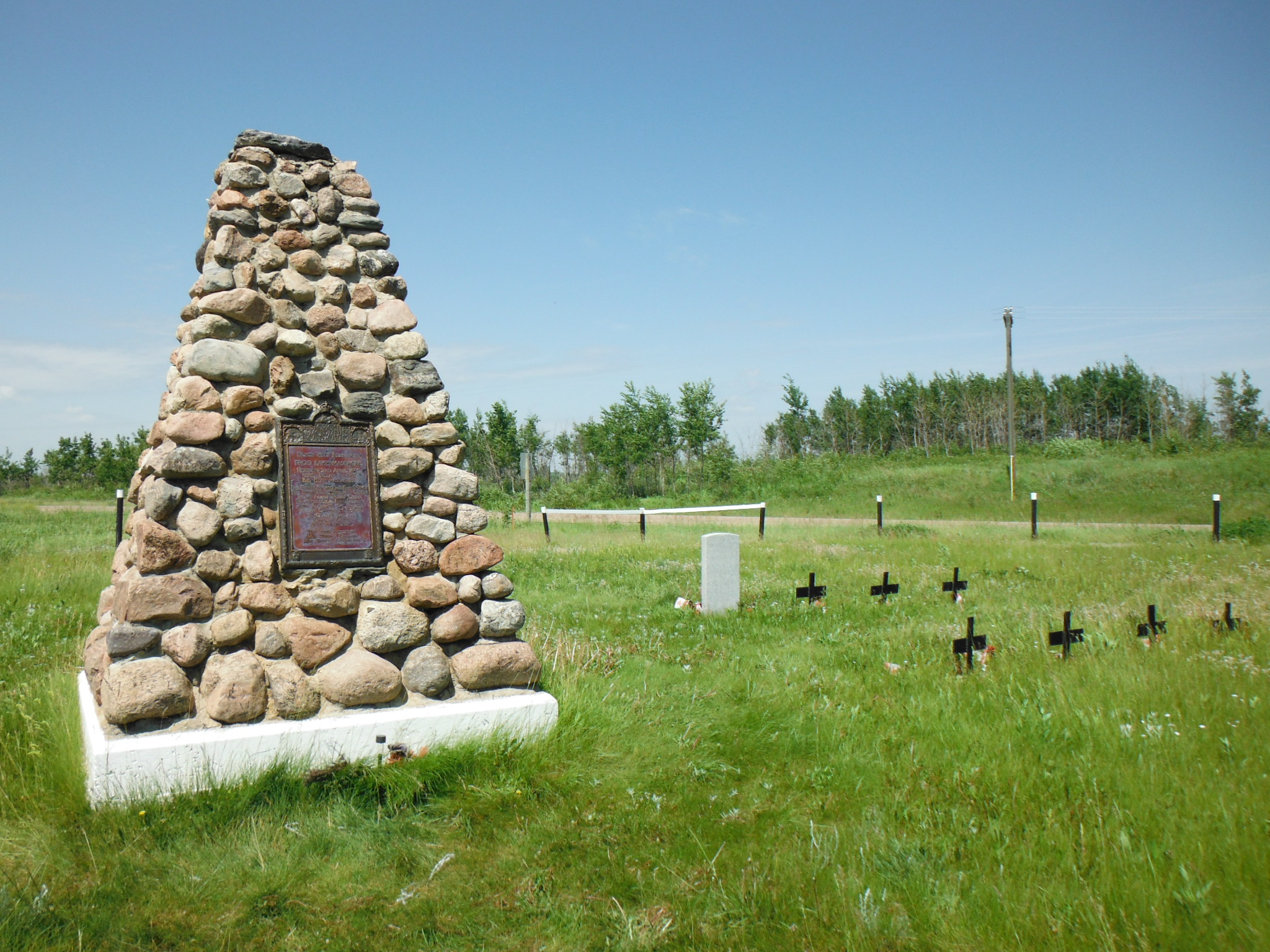
Frog Lake National Historic Site

Frog Lake became part of the province of Alberta in 1905. The site of the massacre was designated the "Frog Lake National Historic Site" in 1923. Parks Canada says the site designated by the Historic Sites and Monuments Board of Canada is extensive, but the national park service owns only a small portion, mainly a graveyard, where a stone cairn and federal plaque were erected in 1924. The geographic coordinates on this page are for that cairn.

In 2008, Christine Tell (provincial minister for tourism, parks, culture and sport) said "the 125th commemoration, in 2010, of the 1885 Northwest Resistance is an excellent opportunity to tell the story of the prairie Métis and First Nations peoples' struggle with Government forces and how it has shaped Canada today."

== See also ==
- Bell of Frog Lake
- Wandering Spirit (Cree leader)
- List of massacres in Canada
