= Battleford =

Town in Saskatchewan, Canada

- Town
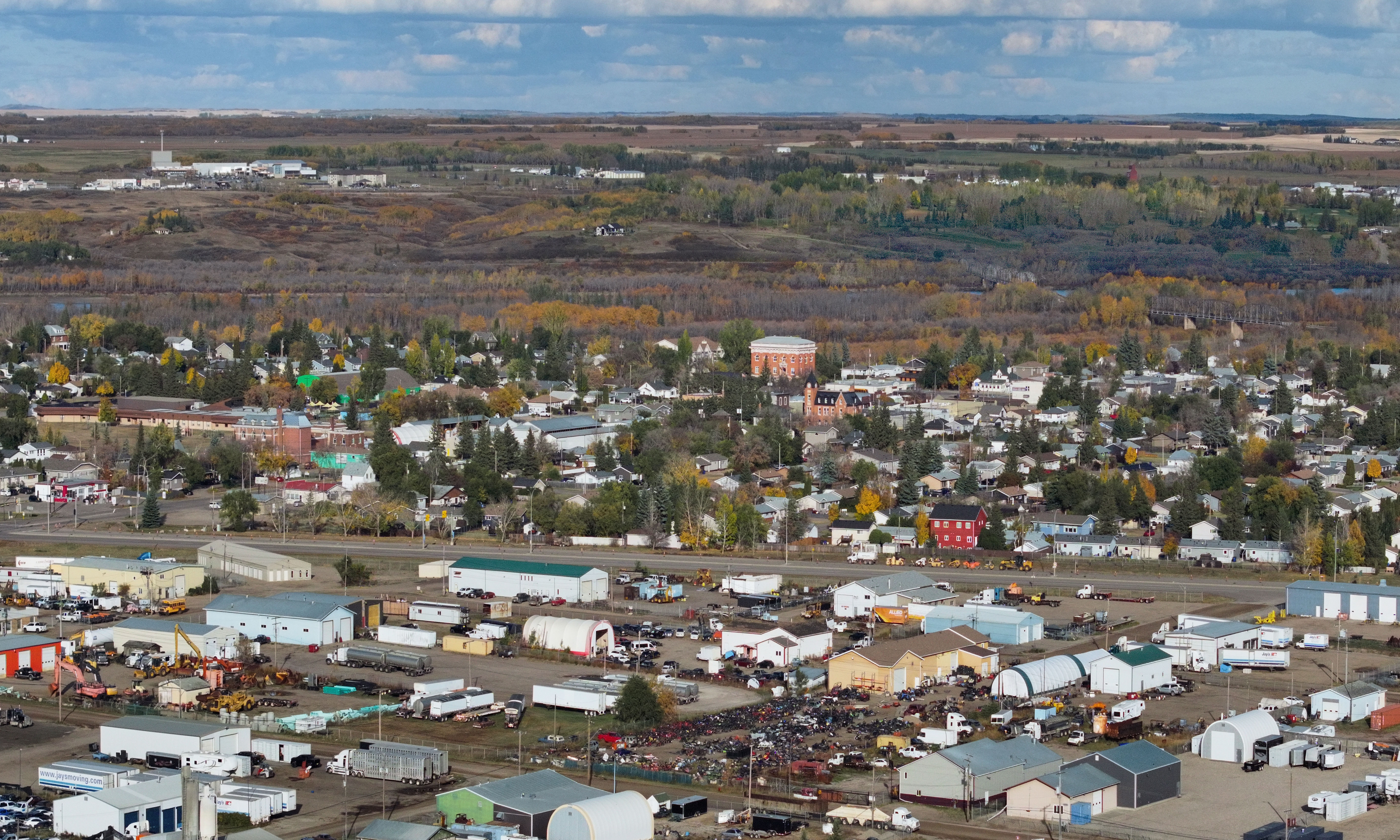
- Downtown Battleford, pictured in 2025
- Nicknames: "The Battlefords", "South Battleford"
- Location within Saskatchewan
- Coordinates: 52°44′18″N 108°18′55″W
- Country: Canada
- Province: Saskatchewan
- Census division: 12
- Post office founded: 1877
- Incorporated (town): 1904

Government
  - Mayor: Ames Leslie
  - Governing body: Battleford Town Council
  - Fed. riding: Battlefords—Lloydminster
  - Prov. riding: The Battlefords

Area
  - Land: 23.26 km^{2} (8.98 sq mi)
  - Urban: 2.14 km^{2} (0.83 sq mi)

Population (2021)
  - Total: 4,400
  - Density: 189.2/km^{2} (490/sq mi)
  - Urban: 3,651
  - Urban density: 1,705.8/km^{2} (4,418/sq mi)
- Time zone: UTC−06:00 (CST)
- Postal code: S0M 0E0
- Area code: 306
- Highways: Highway 4
- Waterways: North Saskatchewan River; Battle River
- Website: www.battleford.ca

Battleford (2021 population 4,400) is a town located across the North Saskatchewan River from the city of North Battleford, in Saskatchewan, Canada.

Battleford and North Battleford are collectively referred to as "The Battlefords". Although there has been occasional talk of the two communities merging, they remain separate entities. The local economy is fuelled mainly by agriculture.

== History ==
The Battleford area, dating from the 1770s, was the site of fur trading houses of numerous independent companies as well as the Hudson's Bay Company (that opened its Battleford, or Battle River post circa 1868). William Holmes operated a trading post for the North West Company just above the confluence of the Battle and Saskatchewan rivers in 1784. At least three posts were in use between 1868 and 1914.

The town itself was founded in 1875 as a fur trading post and North-West Mounted Police (NWMP) fort. Its post office opened in 1877. Between 1876 and 1883, Battleford was the territorial capital of the North-West Territories (now Alberta, Saskatchewan, Nunavut, northern Quebec, northern Ontario and the Northwest Territories) and the NWMP fort (Fort Battleford) located there played an important role in the 1885 North-West Rebellion. It is also the terminus of the historic Swift Current–Battleford Trail.

In 1883, the Battleford Industrial School opened. A residential school for First Nations children in Battleford, it operated from 1883 to 1914. It was the first residential school operated by the Government of Canada with the aim of assimilating Indigenous people into the society of the settlers. The school was one of three industrial schools opened by the Government of Canada in the early 1880s. The senior officials of the Department of Indian Affairs arranged for various religious denominations to administer and operate the schools. The federal government delegated responsibility for the Battleford school to an Anglican minister.

In 1888, the Canadian Pacific Railway was completed in the area. In 1892, Hudson's Bay Company opened a new store in Battleford, which closed in 1910.

=== Looting of Battleford ===
On March 30, 1885, during the North-West Rebellion, the town of Battleford was looted by a party of Cree, who were short on food due to declining bison populations. When the Cree approached Battleford, the 500 residents fled to the nearby North-West Mounted Police post, Fort Battleford. The Crees then took food and supplies from the abandoned stores and houses. Two people died during the looting. Crooked Leg was accused of killing John Payne, and Man Without Blood was accused of killing a farmer named Tremont. They were convicted of murder and hanged later that year.

== Geography ==
Battleford is located along the North Saskatchewan River near the mouth of the Battle River. It is bordered by the Rural Municipality of Battle River No. 438, as well as by the city of North Battleford and a small section of the Rural Municipality of North Battleford No. 437.

=== Climate ===
Climate data is taken from North Battleford Airport located 5.41 km (3.36 mi) northeast of the town.

North Battleford and the surrounding area experiences a humid continental climate (Köppen climate classification Dfb). The average high during the end of July is 24.6 °C (76.3 °F) and the average low is 11.3 °C (52.3 °F). For the middle of January the average high is −12.3 °C (9.9 °F) and the average low is −22.6 °C (−8.7 °F).

The highest temperature ever recorded in North Battleford was 39.5 °C (103.1 °F) on July 13, 2002. The coldest temperature ever recorded was −51.7 °C (−61 °F) on February 1, 1893 and January 12, 1916.

Climate data for North Battleford (North Battleford Airport) WMO ID: 71876; coordinates 52°46′19″N 108°15′20″W; elevation: 548.3 m (1,799 ft); 1991–2020 normals, (Note: Rain, snow, days with rain, and days with snow annually and for December are not available,) extremes 1879–present (Note: Climate data was recorded in the city of Battleford from November 1879 to March 1942, and at North Battleford Airport from March 1942 to present.)
| Month | Jan | Feb | Mar | Apr | May | Jun | Jul | Aug | Sep | Oct | Nov | Dec | Year |
|---|---|---|---|---|---|---|---|---|---|---|---|---|---|
| Record high humidex | 10.7 | 10.1 | 19.3 | 30.0 | 36.9 | 41.5 | 42.9 | 40.7 | 36.9 | 30.0 | 19.3 | 10.4 | 42.9 |
| Record high °C (°F) | 10.8 (51.4) | 10.4 (50.7) | 19.3 (66.7) | 32.2 (90.0) | 34.9 (94.8) | 37.8 (100.0) | 39.5 (103.1) | 38.3 (100.9) | 36.5 (97.7) | 30.0 (86.0) | 19.5 (67.1) | 10.9 (51.6) | 39.5 (103.1) |
| Mean daily maximum °C (°F) | −10.1 (13.8) | −7.8 (18.0) | −1.2 (29.8) | 9.9 (49.8) | 18.0 (64.4) | 21.7 (71.1) | 24.3 (75.7) | 23.7 (74.7) | 18.5 (65.3) | 9.4 (48.9) | −1.4 (29.5) | −8.4 (16.9) | 8.1 (46.6) |
| Daily mean °C (°F) | −15.3 (4.5) | −13.3 (8.1) | −6.6 (20.1) | 3.3 (37.9) | 10.5 (50.9) | 15.1 (59.2) | 17.6 (63.7) | 16.6 (61.9) | 11.3 (52.3) | 3.3 (37.9) | −6.3 (20.7) | −13.4 (7.9) | 1.9 (35.4) |
| Mean daily minimum °C (°F) | −20.6 (−5.1) | −18.9 (−2.0) | −12.0 (10.4) | −3.3 (26.1) | 3.0 (37.4) | 8.5 (47.3) | 10.8 (51.4) | 9.4 (48.9) | 4.1 (39.4) | −2.8 (27.0) | −11.1 (12.0) | −18.4 (−1.1) | −4.3 (24.3) |
| Record low °C (°F) | −51.7 (−61.1) | −51.7 (−61.1) | −38.4 (−37.1) | −27.8 (−18.0) | −13.2 (8.2) | −2.9 (26.8) | 1.6 (34.9) | −1.8 (28.8) | −10.3 (13.5) | −27.2 (−17.0) | −35.8 (−32.4) | −44.2 (−47.6) | −51.7 (−61.1) |
| Record low wind chill | −55.3 | −54.6 | −48.2 | −35.8 | −16.4 | −5.4 | 0.0 | −3.9 | −14.0 | −29.6 | −41.1 | −51.7 | −55.3 |
| Average precipitation mm (inches) | 18.9 (0.74) | 14.2 (0.56) | 12.9 (0.51) | 25.0 (0.98) | 30.6 (1.20) | 60.1 (2.37) | 77.4 (3.05) | 50.7 (2.00) | 28.4 (1.12) | 20.4 (0.80) | 20.8 (0.82) | 23.8 (0.94) | 383.2 (15.09) |
| Average rainfall mm (inches) | 0.2 (0.01) | 0.6 (0.02) | 2.6 (0.10) | 16.5 (0.65) | 29.5 (1.16) | 65.7 (2.59) | 72.5 (2.85) | 55.5 (2.19) | 32.0 (1.26) | 11.1 (0.44) | 2.3 (0.09) | — | — |
| Average snowfall cm (inches) | 21.1 (8.3) | 13.7 (5.4) | 14.2 (5.6) | 11.4 (4.5) | 2.0 (0.8) | 0.0 (0.0) | 0.0 (0.0) | 0.0 (0.0) | 0.9 (0.4) | 8.5 (3.3) | 16.8 (6.6) | — | — |
| Average precipitation days (≥ 0.2 mm) | 12.2 | 10.1 | 8.6 | 9.8 | 9.0 | 13.0 | 12.9 | 9.9 | 7.7 | 8.3 | 11.4 | 12.8 | 125.6 |
| Average rainy days (≥ 0.2 mm) | 0.56 | 0.38 | 1.2 | 6.0 | 8.1 | 12.7 | 12.6 | 9.5 | 7.8 | 5.0 | 0.73 | — | — |
| Average snowy days (≥ 0.2 cm) | 10.5 | 6.7 | 6.8 | 4.1 | 0.63 | 0.12 | 0.0 | 0.0 | 0.19 | 3.1 | 7.4 | — | — |
| Average relative humidity (%) (at 1500 LST) | 72.8 | 71.6 | 66.1 | 46.8 | 38.4 | 48.0 | 51.0 | 47.5 | 45.2 | 53.5 | 70.2 | 74.4 | 57.1 |
Source: Environment and Climate Change Canada (January extreme minimum) (February extreme minimum)

== Demographics ==
In the 2021 Canadian census conducted by Statistics Canada, Battleford had a population of 4.400 living in 1,758 of its 1,877 total private dwellings, a change of −0.7% from its 2016 population of 4,429. With a land area of 23.26 km^{2} (8.98 sq mi), it had a population density of 189.2/km^{2} (489.9/sq mi) in 2021.

The median age of the population in 2021 was 41.6, compared to the provincial figure of 38.8, and 79.6% were over the age of 15. The indigenous population was 23.9%, compared to 17.0% for Saskatchewan. Of the indigenous population, 52.9% were First Nations (Saskatchewan 64.5%), 43.1% were Métis (Saskatchewan 33.4%), and 3.4% gave other responses (Saskatchewan 2.1%).

Canada census – Battleford community profile

| | 2021 | 2016 | 2011 |
| Population | 4,400 (-0.7% from 2016) | 4,429 (+9.0% from 2011) | 4,065 (+10.3% from 2006) |
| Land area | 23.26 km^{2} (8.98 sq mi) | 23.33 km^{2} (9.01 sq mi) | 23.33 km^{2} (9.01 sq mi) |
| Population density | 189.2/km^{2} (490/sq mi) | 189.8/km^{2} (492/sq mi) | 174.2/km^{2} (451/sq mi) |
| Median age | 41.6 (M: 40.4, F: 42.4) | 40.3 (M: 39.9, F: 40.6) | 40.6 (M: 39.9, F: 41.1) |
| Private dwellings | 1,877 (total) 1,758 (occupied) | 1,816 (total) 1,755 (occupied) | 1,652 (total) |
| Median household income | $91,000 | $82,304 |

References: 2021 2016 2011

Federal census population history of Battleford

| Year | Pop. | ±% |
|---|---|---|
| 1901 | 609 | — |
| 1911 | 1,335 | +119.2% |
| 1921 | 1,229 | −7.9% |
| 1931 | 1,096 | −10.8% |
| 1941 | 1,336 | +21.9% |

| Year | Pop. | ±% |
|---|---|---|
| 1951 | 1,319 | −1.3% |
| 1961 | 1,627 | +23.4% |
| 1971 | 1,803 | +10.8% |
| 1981 | 3,565 | +97.7% |
| 1991 | 4,107 | +15.2% |

| Year | Pop. | ±% |
|---|---|---|
| 2001 | 3,820 | −7.0% |
| 2006 | 3,685 | −3.5% |
| 2011 | 4,065 | +10.3% |
| 2016 | 4,429 | +9.0% |
| 2021 | 4,400 | −0.7% |

Source: Statistics Canada

Home language (2021)
| Language | Population | Percentage |
|---|---|---|
| English | 4,080 | 96% |
| French | 10 | 0% |
| Other languages | 120 | 3% |

Mother tongue (2021)
| Language | Population | Percentage |
|---|---|---|
| English | 3,850 | 90% |
| French | 45 | 1% |
| Other languages | 290 | 7% |

Visible minorities (2021)
| Ethnicity | Population | Percentage |
|---|---|---|
| Not a visible minority | 4,095 | 96.1% |
| Visible minorities | 165 | 3.9% |

== Historic buildings ==
National historic sites in Battleford include Fort Battleford National Historic Site of Canada, Battleford Court House National Historic Site of Canada and Old Government House / Saint-Charles Scholasticate National Historic Site of Canada. The Old Government House, built in 1878–1879, was destroyed by fire in 2003 and was the seat of Territorial Government from 1878 to 1883

Other historic places in Battleford include the Battleford Land Registry Office built between 1877 and 1878 is the last remaining building on Battleford's Government Ridge that dates from the Territorial era. Other heritage buildings include the District Court House, the Town Hall / Opera House, the Former Land Titles Building, the Station Building, the Fred Light Museum (St. Vital School), St. Vital Church, Gardiner Church and the Former Bank of Montreal Building.

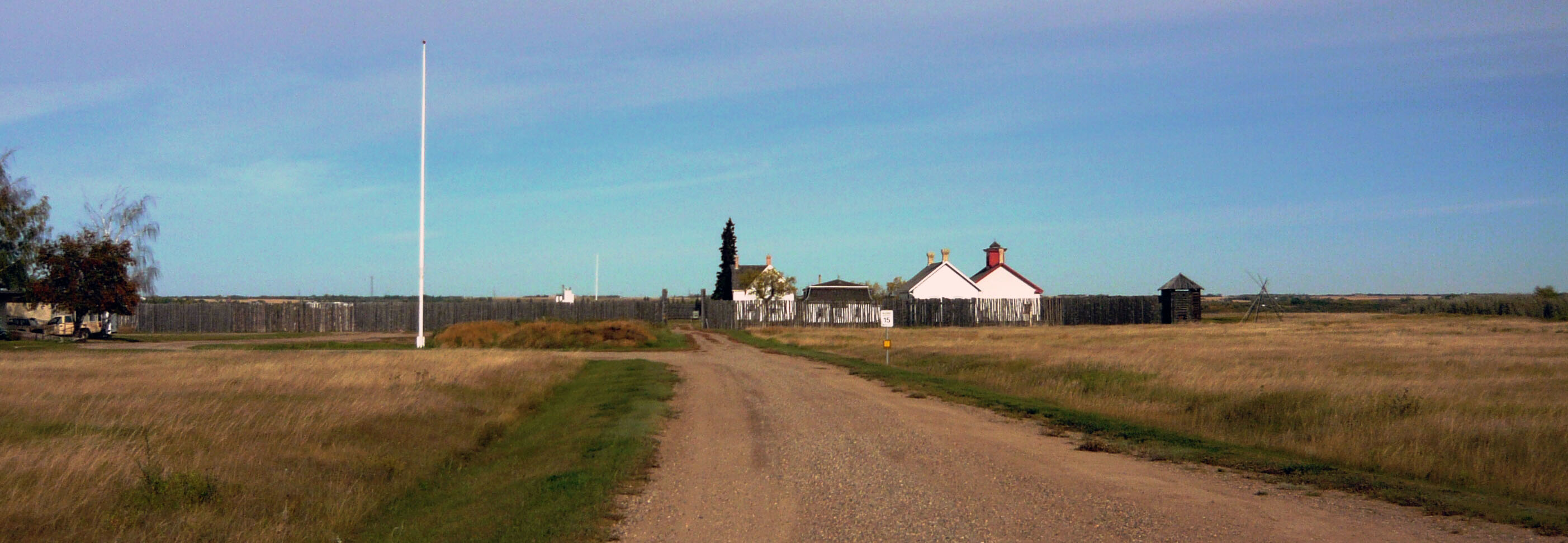
Fort Battleford

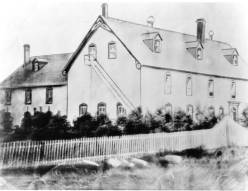
Old Government House

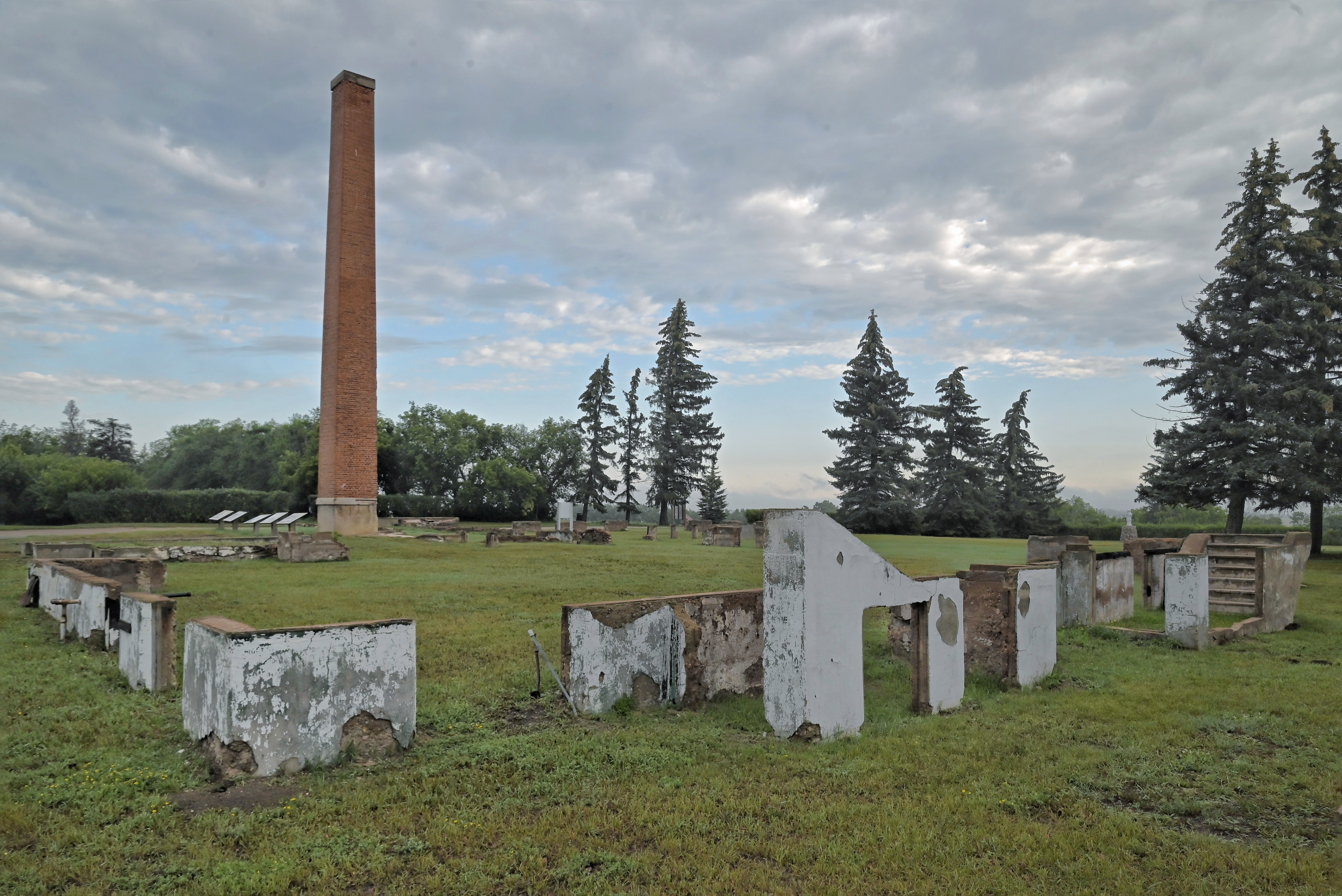
Remains of Old Government House

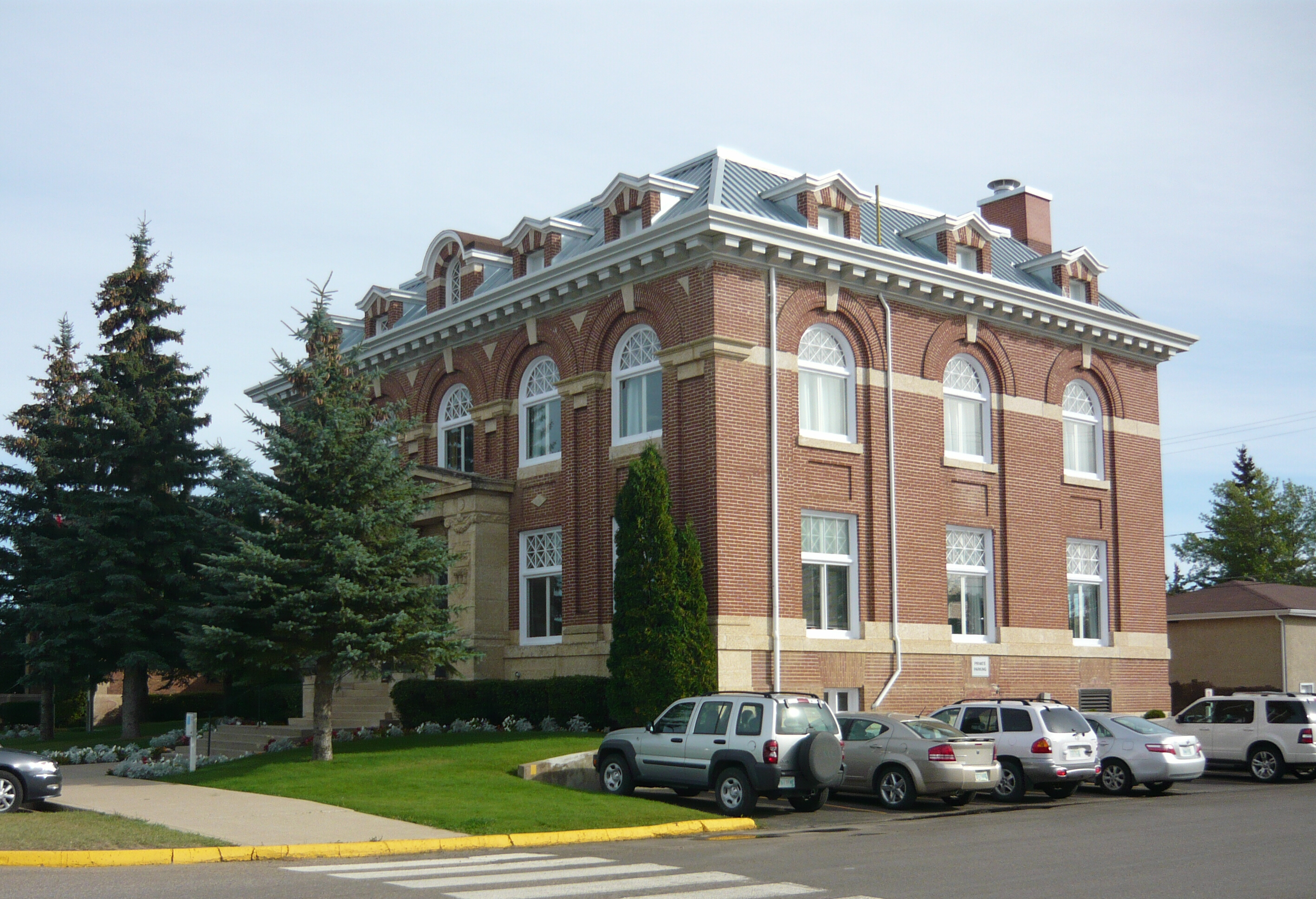
Battleford Court House

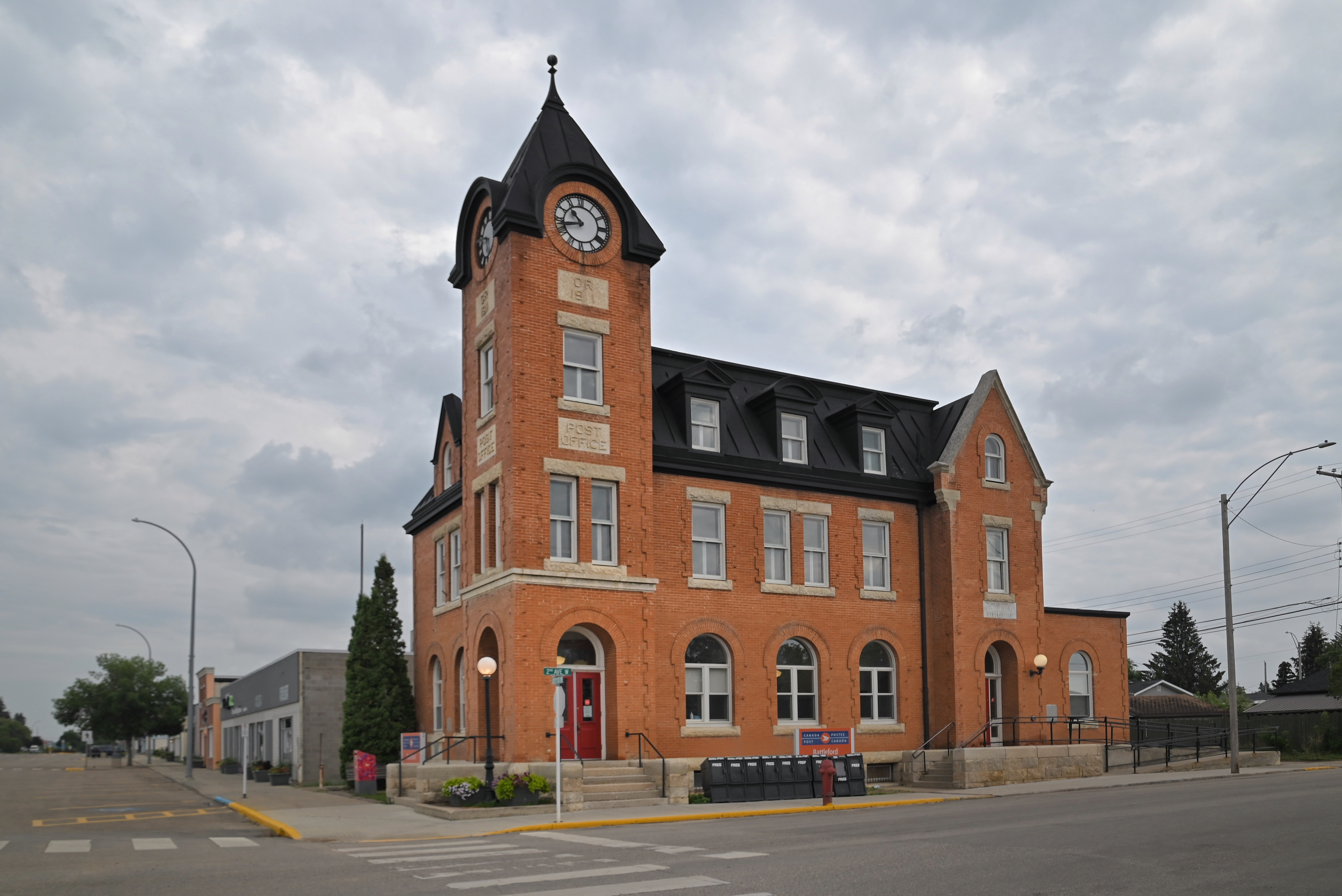
Battleford Post Office

== Attractions ==
- Fort Battleford, historical North-West Mounted Police fort near the confluence of Battle River and North Saskatchewan River
- Finlayson Island Nature Park on Finlayson Island, accessed from the old south Battleford Bridge

== Local media ==
Newspaper

The local newspaper is The Battlefords News Optimist. It is published weekly on Thursday and has circulation in the surrounding area.

Radio

Three local radio stations serve the area; CJNB, CJCQ-FM ("Q98"), and CJHD-FM ("93.3 Beach Radio"). Some Saskatoon radio stations can also be received.

Television

The Battlefords are served by CFQC-TV-2 channel 6, an analogue repeater of CTV station CFQC-DT Saskatoon.

== See also ==
- List of communities in Saskatchewan
- List of towns in Saskatchewan
