= List of regions of Nunavut =

List of regions in Nunavut, Canada

Regions of Nunavut
- Location: Nunavut
- Number: 3
- Populations: 6,458 (Kitikmeot Region) — 19,355 (Qikiqtaaluk Region)
- Areas: 432,108.00 km^{2} (166,837.83 sq mi) (Kitikmeot Region) — 970,554.61 km^{2} (374,733.23 sq mi) (Qikiqtaaluk Region)
- Government: Administrative region
- Subdivisions: Municipalities

The Canadian territory of Nunavut, which was established in 1999 from the Northwest Territories by the 1993 Nunavut Land Claims Agreement, is divided into three regions. Though these regions have no governments of their own, Nunavut's territorial government services are highly decentralized on a regional basis.

In addition, these regions serve as census divisions for Statistics Canada. Prior to the 2021 Canadian census the Qikiqtaaluk Region and the Kivalliq Region were known as the "Baffin Region" and the "Keewatin Region" respectively to the agency.

It is a misconception that Nunavut's regions constitute the former regions of the Northwest Territories (NWT), separated in their entirety. This is not the case, rather, the portions of the regions of the Northwest Territories that ended up in the newly created territory were retained and had their borders slightly adjusted upon the creation of Nunavut.

The regional divisions are distinct from the district system of dividing the Northwest Territories that dated to 1876 and was abolished when Nunavut was created, although for practical purposes had not been used since the 1980s. Nunavut encompasses the entirety of the District of Keewatin (which had differing boundaries from the Keewatin/Kivalliq regions), the majority of the District of Franklin and a small portion of the District of Mackenzie.

== List ==
Region (census division)	Regional centre	Former NWT region	Population, 2021 (2016)	Population change (2016–2021)	Land area	Population density	Map
Kitikmeot Region ᕿᑎᕐᒥᐅᑦ	Cambridge Bay	Kitikmeot Region	6,458 (6,543)	-1.3%	432,108.00 km^{2} (166,837.83 sq mi)	0.015/km^{2} (0.039/sq mi)	
Kivalliq Region ᑭᕙᓪᓕᖅ	Rankin Inlet	Keewatin Region	11,045 (10,413)	+6.1%	434,331.16 km^{2} (167,696.20 sq mi)	0.025/km^{2} (0.066/sq mi)	
Qikiqtaaluk Region ᕿᑭᖅᑖᓗᒃ	Iqaluit	Baffin Region	19,355 (18,988)	+1.9%	970,554.61 km^{2} (374,733.23 sq mi)	0.020/km^{2} (0.052/sq mi)	
