= Districts of the Northwest Territories =

Division and administration of Canada's Northwest Territories

The vastness of Canada's Northwest Territories (Note: Spelled North-West Territories from 1870 to 1906.) meant that for much of its history it was divided into several districts for ease of administration. The number and size of these territorial districts varied as other provinces and territories of Canada were created and expanded. The districts of the Northwest Territories were abolished in 1999 with the creation of the Nunavut territory and the contraction of the Northwest Territories to its current size.

== North-West Territories before districts ==
The North-West Territories were administered as a single entity, with no districts, from 1870 to 1882.

In 1870, Canada gained control of Rupert's Land and the North-Western Territory from the Hudson's Bay Company. That same year, a small piece of Rupert's Land was formed into the province of Manitoba, but the rest of the area was merged and renamed the North-West Territories. This region included the vast bulk of Canada's present day landmass and covered an area about the size of western Europe.

In 1876, the North-West Territories contracted in size when a large area of 590,932 km^{2} (228,160 sq mi), between Manitoba and Ontario and along the entire west coast of Hudson Bay, was established by Canada as a territory named the District of Keewatin. This autonomous territory is not to be confused with the districts which would later be created within the North-West Territories.

In 1880, the Canadian Arctic Archipelago was ceded to Canada by the United Kingdom and this land was added to the North-West Territories.

== Timeline ==
Districts of the Northwest Territories
District	Created	Abolished	Present Location	Territory covered	Notes
Alberta	1882	1905	Alberta	The south-central and southwestern portion of the modern-day Province of Alberta	
Assiniboia	1882	1905	Saskatchewan, Alberta	The southern quarter of the modern-day Province of Saskatchewan, and the extreme southeastern portion of the modern-day Province of Alberta	
Athabasca	1882	1905	Alberta, Saskatchewan	Originally the northern portion of the modern-day Province of Alberta.; Expanded in 1895 to include the northern portion of the modern-day Province of Saskatchewan.	
Franklin	1895	1999	Northwest Territories, Nunavut	All Canadian Arctic Ocean islands, plus the mainland Melville Peninsula and Boothia Peninsula (both in modern-day Nunavut), which were added in 1897.; Expanded in 1920 to include islands in Hudson Bay, James Bay and Ungava Bay.	District effectively ceased to function many years prior to 1999, with the creation of NWT "administrative regions"
Keewatin	1905	1999	Nunavut, Ontario, Manitoba	Initially included the extreme far north portions of modern-day Ontario and Manitoba, as well as almost all of the mainland portions of modern-day Nunavut.; All land south of the 60th parallel ceded to Ontario and Manitoba in 1912.; Not to be confused with the District of Keewatin (1876–1905), an autonomous entity that was not part of NWT.	District effectively ceased to function many years prior to 1999, with the creation of NWT "administrative regions"
Mackenzie	1895	1999	Northwest Territories, Nunavut, Yukon	Includes almost all of the mainland portion of the present-day Northwest Territories, and the extreme northwestern mainland portion (the 'mainland panhandle') of present-day Nunavut.; Initially included some land which is now in the far eastern and northeastern portion of Yukon; ceded this land to Yukon Territory in 1901 as part of a boundary adjustment, while gaining a tiny strip of land in the process.	District effectively ceased to function many years prior to 1999, with the creation of NWT "administrative regions"
Saskatchewan	1882	1905	Saskatchewan, Alberta, Manitoba	The central and north-central portion of the modern-day Province of Saskatchewan, as well as a northeastern portion of the modern-day Province of Alberta, and a northwestern portion of the modern-day Province of Manitoba	
Ungava	1895	1920	Quebec, Newfoundland and Labrador, Nunavut	Initially included modern-day northern Quebec; the interior of modern-day Labrador; and islands in Hudson Bay, James Bay and Ungava Bay that are now part of Nunavut.; The southernmost part of the district was ceded to Quebec in 1898.; All remaining continental land was ceded to Quebec in 1912.; The remaining (uninhabited) offshore islands were transferred to the District of Franklin in 1920.	District effectively ceased to function in 1912, once all continental land had been ceded to Quebec.
Yukon	1895	1898	Yukon	Almost exactly coterminous with modern-day Yukon; some land in present-day Yukon on the eastern border was transferred from the District of Mackenzie in 1901, which gained a tiny strip of land in the process.	Converted into the autonomous Yukon Territory in 1898 due to the advent of the Klondike Gold Rush

=== 1882 ===
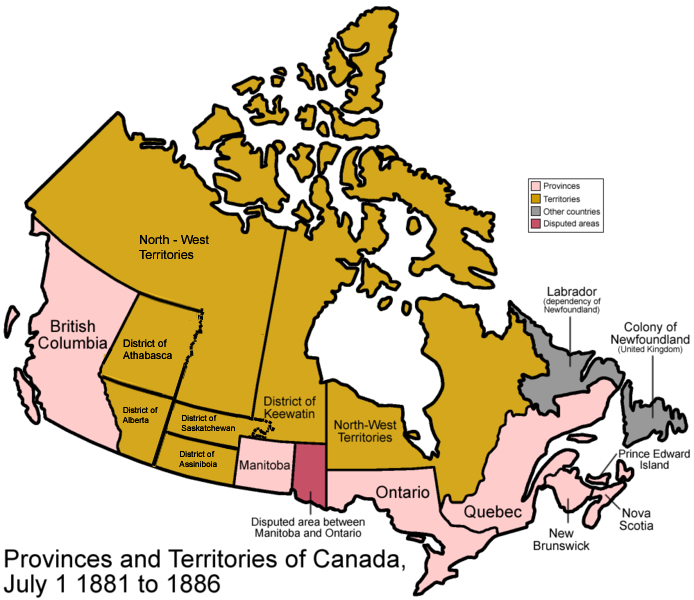
1882 districts are superimposed over the 1881 map

As the southern part of the North-West Territories became populated, four districts were created in 1882 for ease of administration; unlike Keewatin, these areas remained a part of the North-West Territories, and thus were formally called provisional districts:

- The District of Alberta was where the southwestern part of the province of Alberta is today, east of British Columbia, west of the line between ranges 10 and 11 of the Dominion Land Survey (about 112° west) and north of the Canada–US border.
- The District of Athabasca covered the northern half of what is today Alberta.
- The District of Assiniboia was where the southernmost quarter of Saskatchewan is today (south of the Ninth Correction Line, about 51.97° north), but also stretched further west into what is today Alberta.
- The District of Saskatchewan was to the north of Assiniboia extending halfway up modern Saskatchewan (18th Correction Line, about 55.11° north). It stretched further east than Assiniboia, running all the way to the shore of Lake Winnipeg and the Nelson River. It also stretched west into what is now Alberta.

=== 1886 ===
The southwestern border of the autonomous District of Keewatin was adjusted to conform to the boundaries of the District of Saskatchewan.

=== 1895 ===
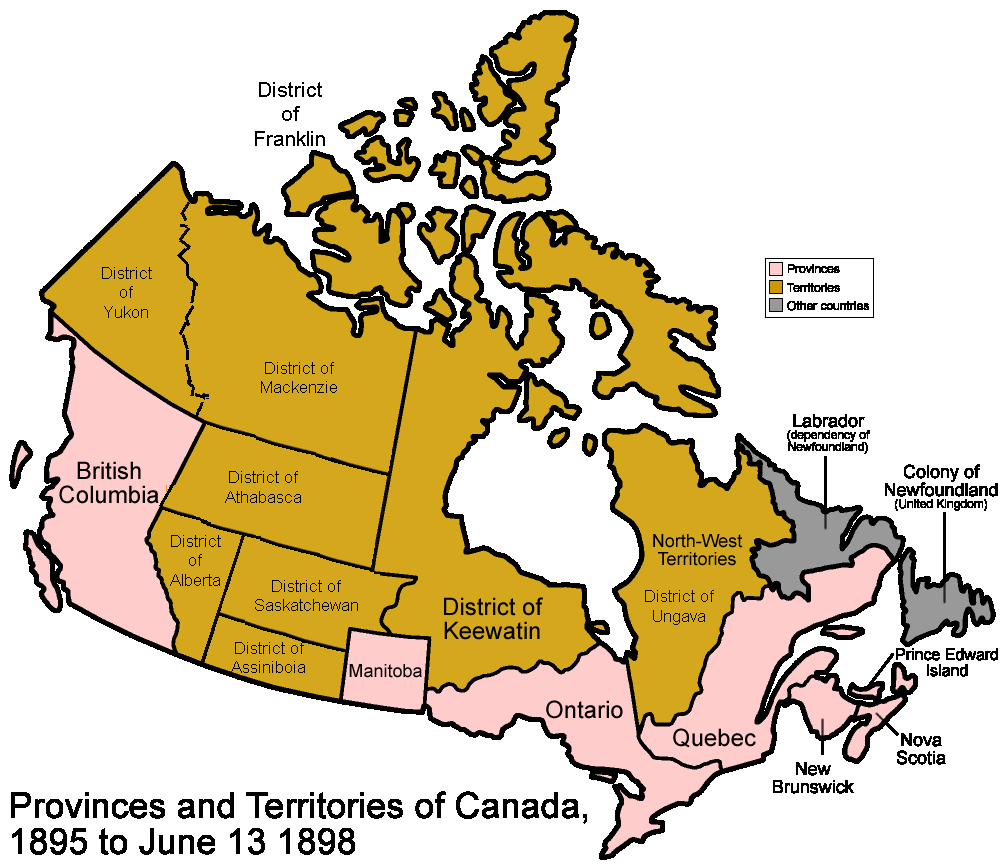

In 1895, the northern portion of the North-West Territories was divided into four more internal districts for ease of administration:

- The District of Franklin was made up of the Arctic islands.
- The District of Ungava was made up of what is today northern Quebec, parts of Labrador, and offshore islands (in Hudson, James and Ungava Bays) that are today part of Nunavut.
- The District of Yukon was made up of what is today the Yukon.
- The District of Mackenzie was the rest, stretching from the Yukon border in the west to the Keewatin border in the east, and containing none of the islands.
- The District of Athabasca expanded and covered the northern half of what is today both Alberta and Saskatchewan.
- The portion of the North-West Territories north of Ontario was ceded to the autonomous District of Keewatin.

=== 1897 ===
Southampton Island, Coats Island, Akimiski Island, and other islands were ceded to the autonomous District of Keewatin, whereas Boothia Peninsula and Melville Peninsula, which were previously part of the autonomous District of Keewatin, were added to the District of Franklin.

=== 1898 ===
The North-West Territories shrunk in 1898 when the Klondike Gold Rush necessitated the conversion of the District of Yukon into the autonomous Yukon Territory. Also, the southernmost part of Ungava was ceded to Quebec.

=== 1901 ===
The eastern border of Yukon Territory was slightly adjusted, thus exchanging some area with the North-West Territories.

=== 1905–1906 ===
The North-West Territories experienced significant adjustments between 1905 and 1906:

- The Districts of Alberta, Assiniboia, Athabasca, and Saskatchewan were reorganized to form the provinces of Alberta and Saskatchewan (1905).
- The autonomous District of Keewatin, portions of which had been converted into the expansion of Manitoba and Ontario, gave up its autonomy and became a district within the North-West Territories (1905).
- The easternmost portions of the (now) defunct Districts of Saskatchewan and Athabaska were added to the District of Keewatin (1905).
- The Northwest Territories now consisted of the Districts of Franklin, Ungava, Mackenzie and Keewatin.
- The hyphen was removed from North-West Territories, so that the area was now named the Northwest Territories (1906).

=== 1912 ===
The Northwest Territories experienced further attrition in 1912:

- The entire continental portion of the District of Ungava was converted into the northern expansion of the province of Quebec. Only the district's more than 1500 almost entirely uninhabited offshore islands remained part of the Northwest Territories; they were made a part of the Franklin District in 1920.
- Most of the District of Keewatin (i.e., everything south of 60 degrees north) was converted into the northern expansion of the provinces of Ontario and Manitoba. In 1920, the easternmost portion of the District of Mackenzie was added to the District of Keewatin.

The Northwest Territories now consisted of the Districts of Franklin, Mackenzie and Keewatin. Ungava remained a district until 1920, but with no population to administer, this district designation was effectively unused after 1912.

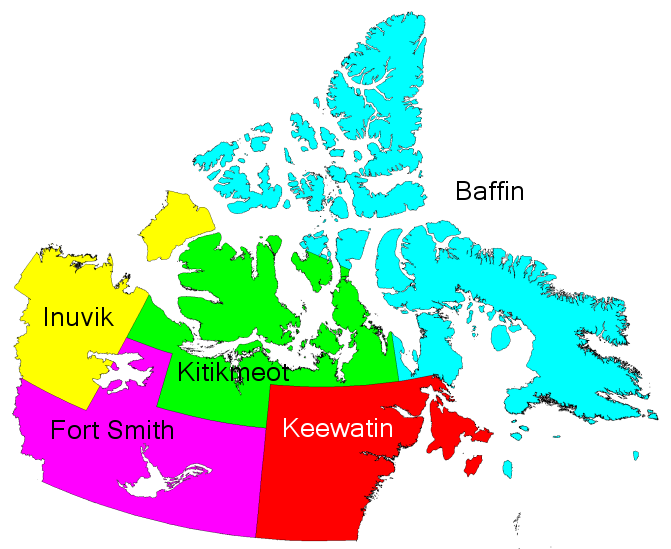
Administrative regions as they existed starting in the 1980s.

The three remaining districts continued to be used for a number of decades, but as control over the territory was moved from departments of the federal government to a centralized government in Yellowknife starting in 1967, they began to have far less use. Although the Districts of Franklin, Mackenzie and Keewatin continued to appear on many maps (and continued to exist), by the 1980s the practical governance of the Northwest Territories was divided into four administrative regions: Inuvik, Fort Smith, Keewatin and Baffin. A fifth region, the Central Arctic Region, subsequently called the Kitikmeot, was later carved out of the Fort Smith Region.

=== 1999 ===
In 1999, the Northwest Territories was reduced to its current size, and the notion of the districts was abolished, with the creation of the territory of Nunavut. The former District of Keewatin, most of the Arctic Islands of the District of Franklin, and a northeast portion of the District of Mackenzie now form Nunavut, with the remainder of Franklin and the majority of Mackenzie forming the current version of the Northwest Territories. Today, the Northwest Territories is divided into five administrative regions.

== See also ==
- Former colonies and territories in Canada
- Territorial evolution of Canada
- Politics of Northwest Territories
- History of the Northwest Territories
- History of Northwest Territories capital cities
- Council of Keewatin
- List of Northwest Territories Legislative Assemblies
