= District of Alberta =

Regional administrative district of Canada's Northwest Territories (1882–1905)

Coordinates: 51.80°N 113.40°W

Provisional District of Alberta
- Provisional district of the North-West Territories
- 1882–1905
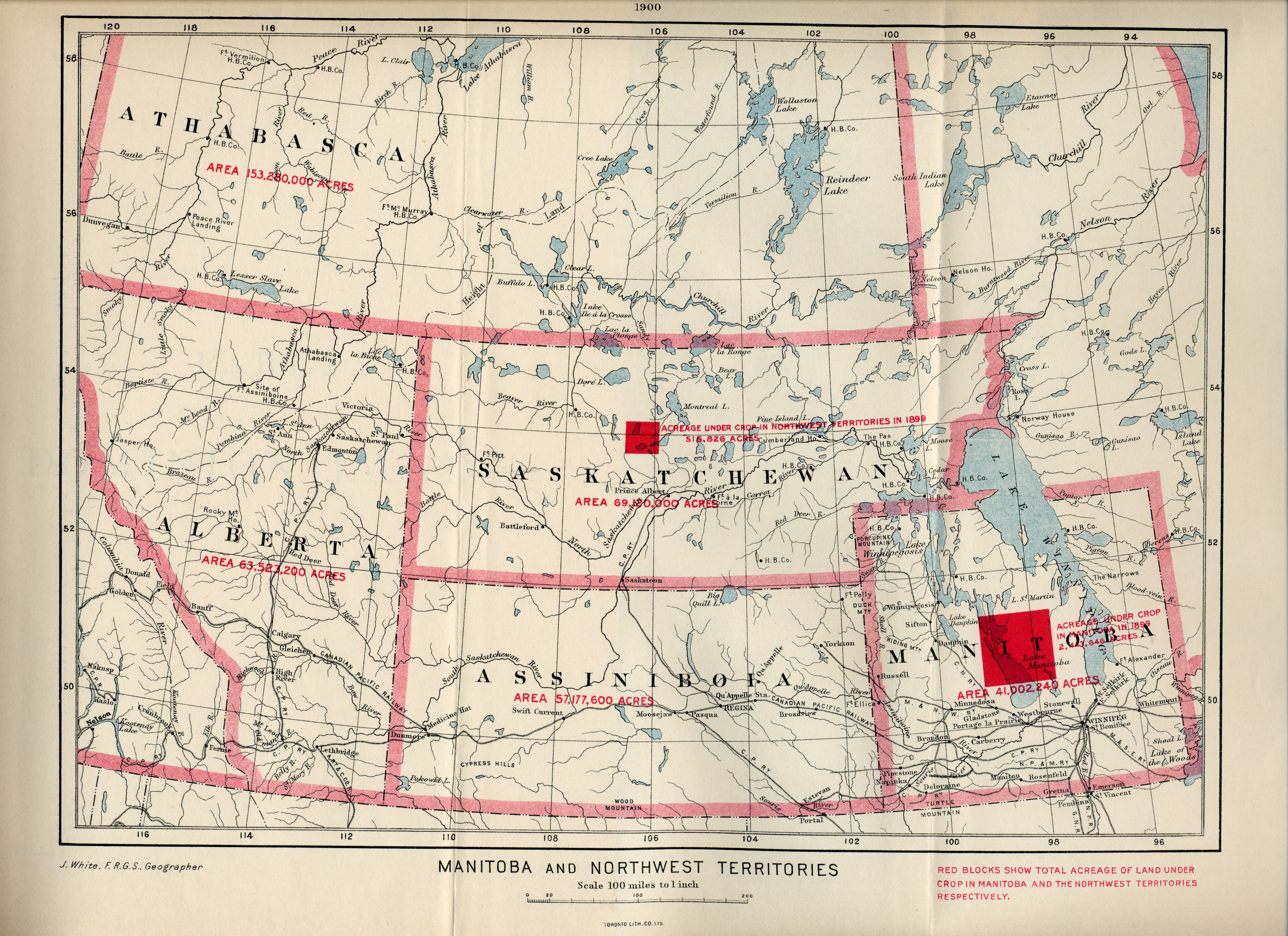
- A 1900 map showing the boundaries of the District of Alberta.
- History
  - Established: 1882
  - Disestablished: 1905
- Today part of: Alberta

The District of Alberta was a regional administrative district of Canada's North-West Territories. It served as an administrative district from 1882 until the creation of the province of Alberta in 1905. The District of Alberta and province of Alberta are named in honour of Princess Louise Caroline Alberta, the fourth daughter of Queen Victoria and Prince Albert.

== Brief overview ==
The District of Alberta and three other provisional districts of the North-West Territories were created 8 May, 1882. It was styled the Alberta Provisional District to distinguish it from the District of Keewatin which had a more autonomous relationship from the NWT administration. The modern province of Alberta was created 1 September, 1905 from the District of Alberta and parts of the Districts of Athabasca, Assiniboia and Saskatchewan.

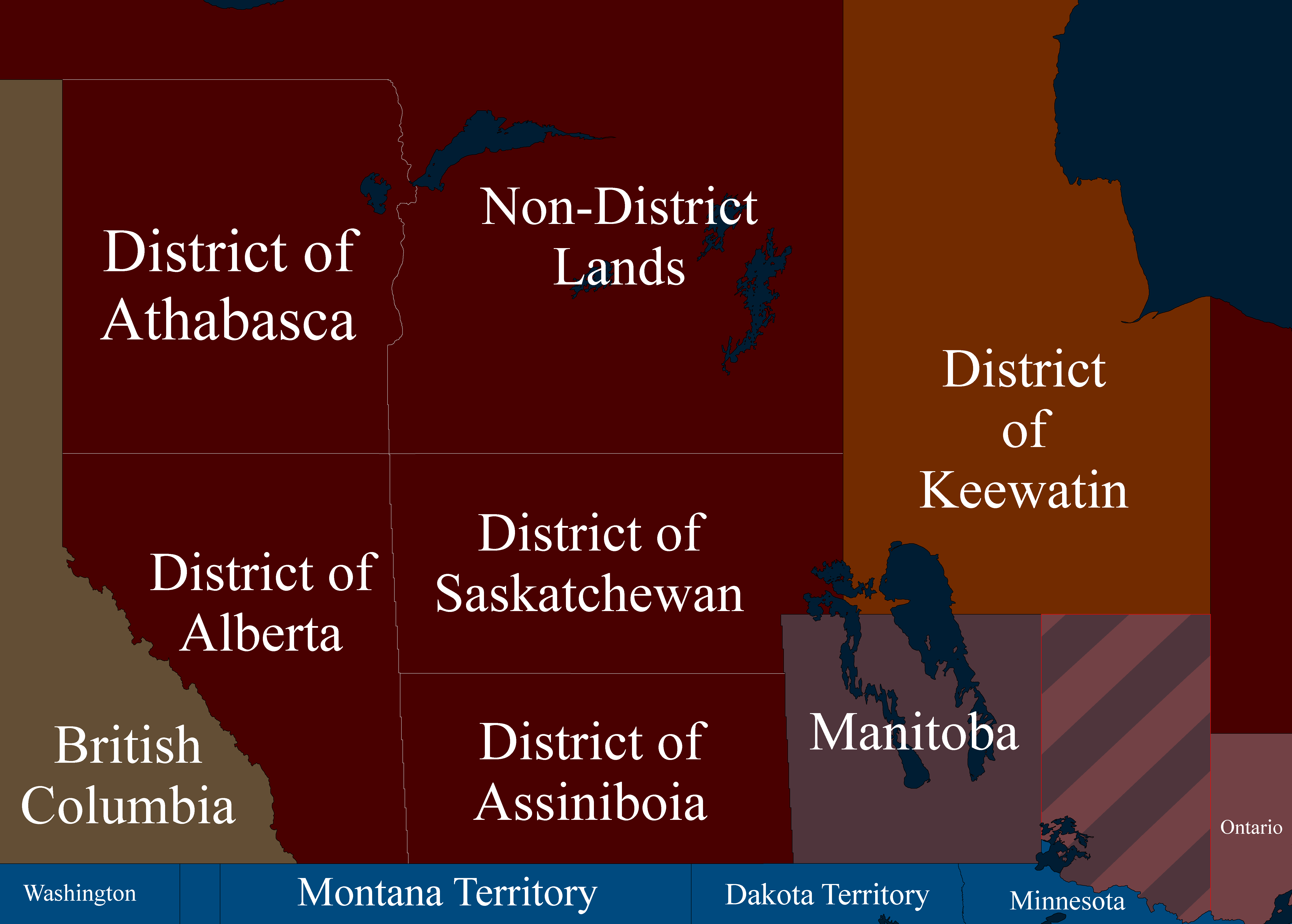
A map of the Canadian Prairies showing the Districts of the North-West Territories in 1882.

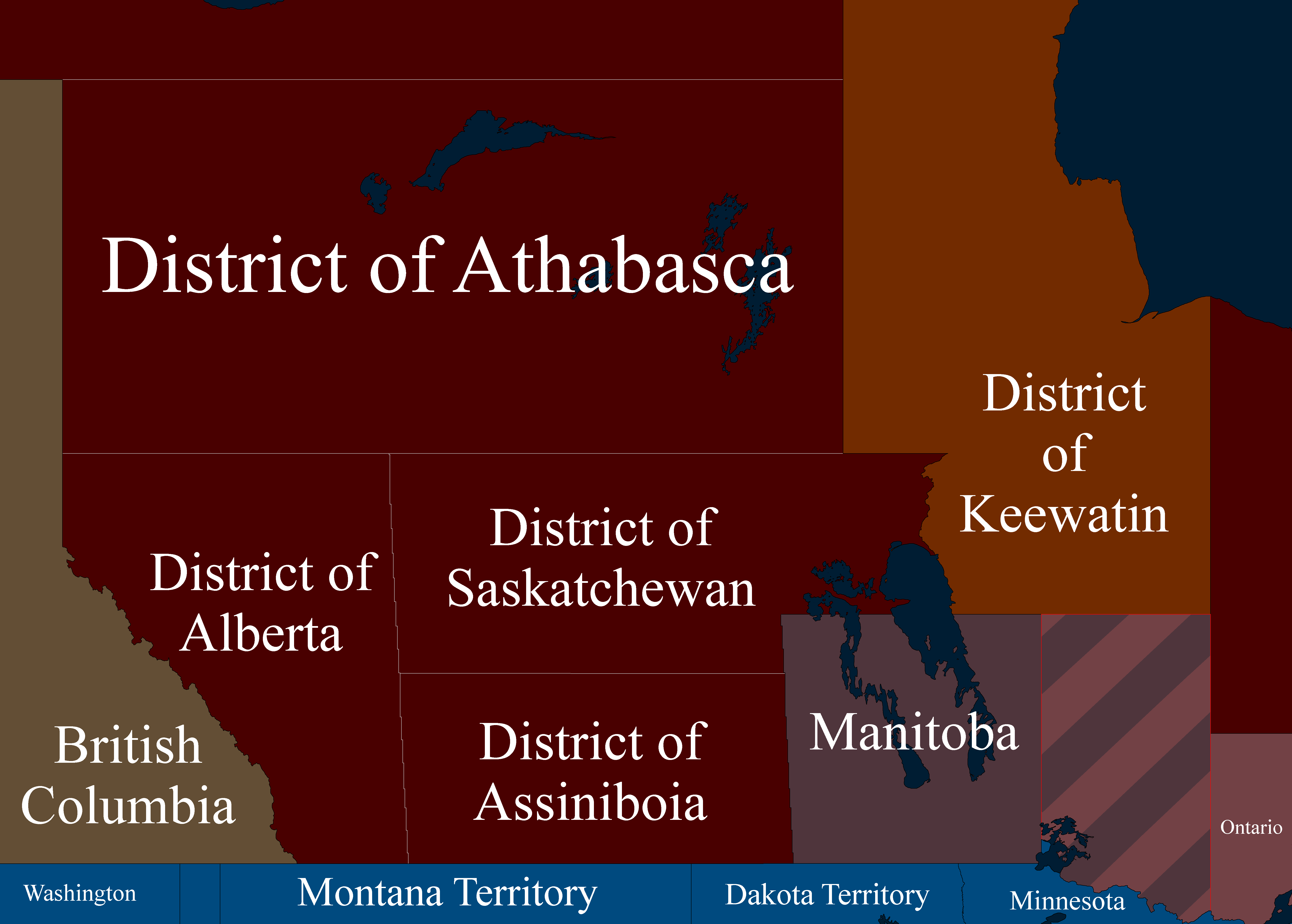
A map of the Canadian Prairies showing the Districts of the North-West Territories in 1886.

The boundaries of the district were:

- On the south, the international boundary, 49° north.
- On the east, the line between the 10th and 11th ranges west of the fourth meridian of the Dominion Land Survey. This line, now designated Range Road 110, has jogs at each correction line. It crosses Highway 16 between Innisfree and Minburn and Highway 1 between Tilley and Suffield.
- On the north, the 18th correction line, approximately 55° north, now designated Township Road 710.
- On the west, the British Columbia boundary: the height of land of Pacific Ocean drainage and the 120th meridian west.

The District of Alberta was used as a federal riding from 1887 to 1908.

== See also ==
- Territorial evolution of Canada
