= District of Athabasca =

Regional administrative district of Canada's Northwest Territories (1882-1905)

Coordinates: 57.405°N 105.037°W

- District of North-West Territories
- 1882–1905
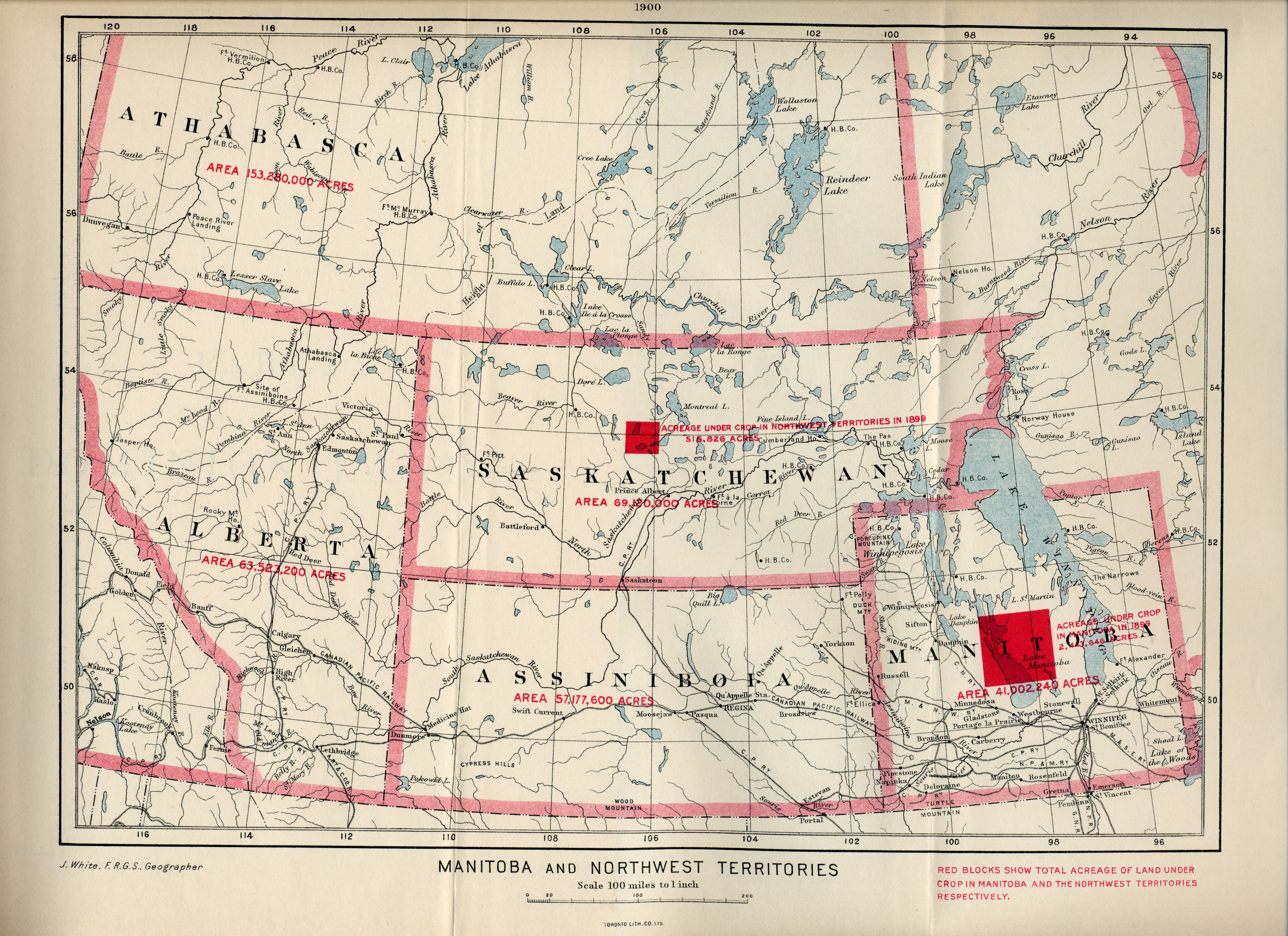
- 1900 map showing boundaries of Athabasca.
- History
  - Established: 1882
  - Disestablished: 1905
- Today part of: Alberta, Saskatchewan

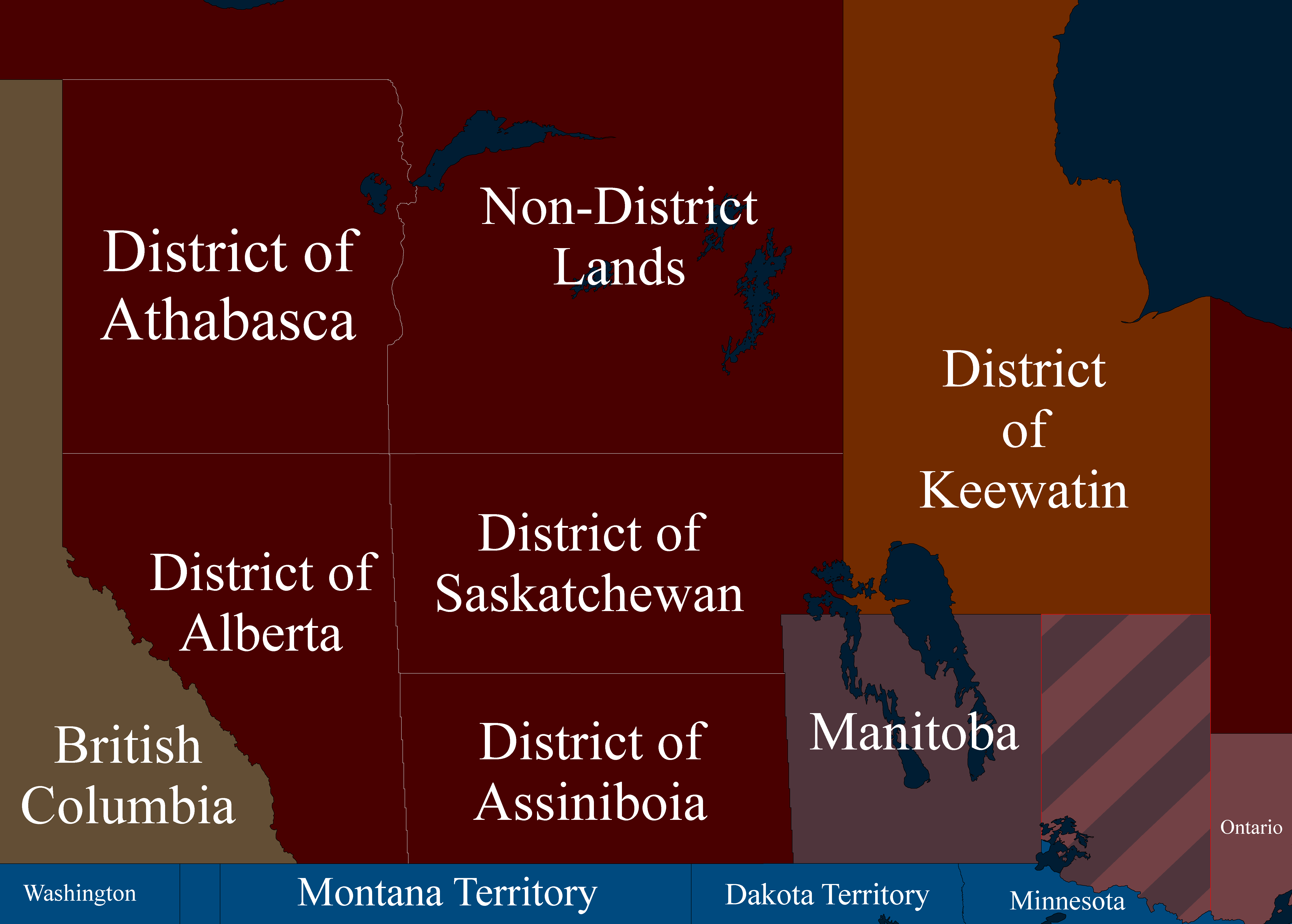
A map of the Canadian Prairies showing the Districts of the North-West Territories in 1882.

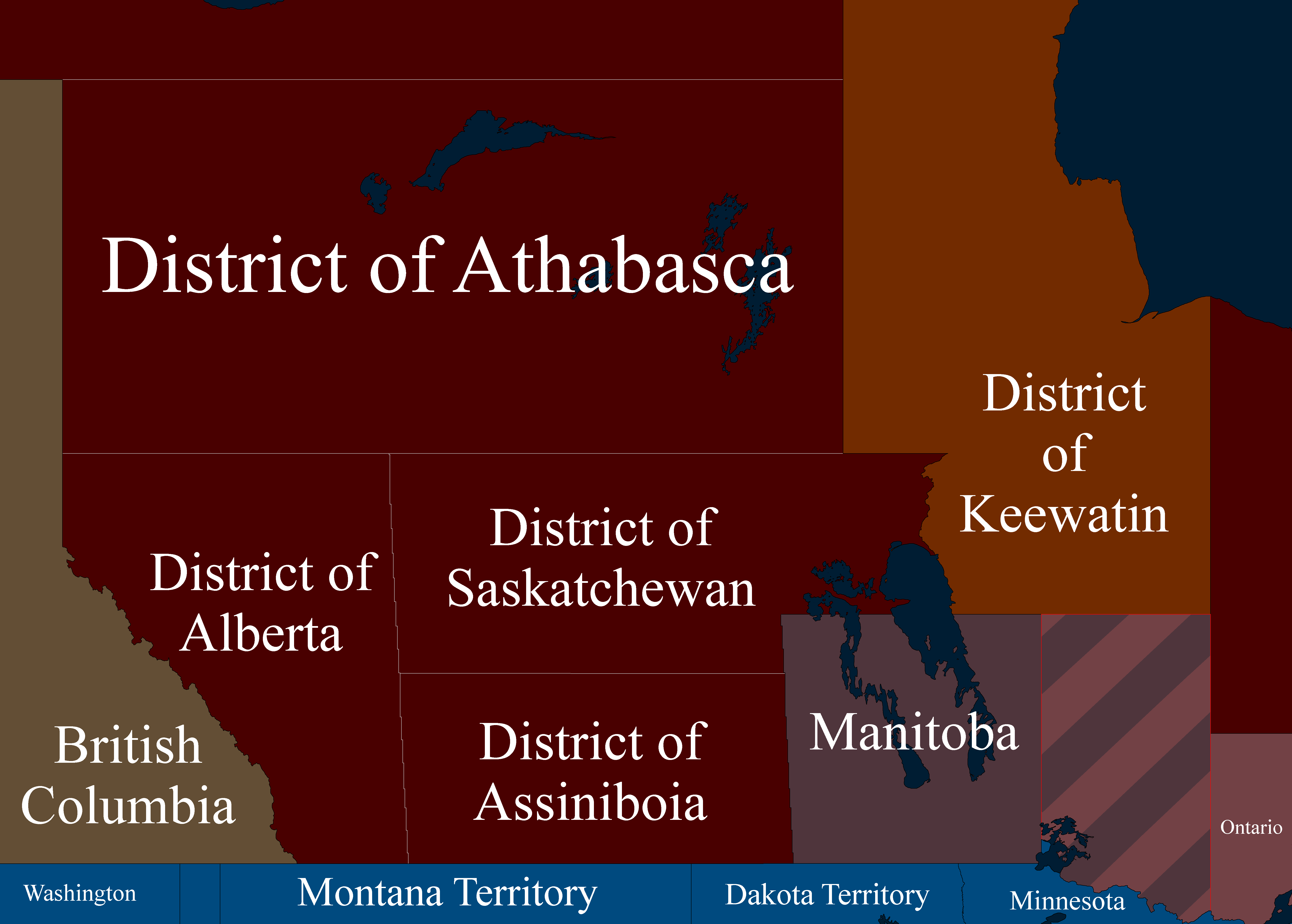
A map of the Canadian Prairies showing the Districts of the North-West Territories in 1886.

The District of Athabasca was a regional administrative district of Canada's Northwest Territories. It was formed in 1882, was later enlarged, and then abolished with the creation of the provinces of Saskatchewan (its central-eastern part) and Alberta (western part) in 1905. The very easternmost part is now within Manitoba.

== Boundaries ==
Its northern boundary was the current southern boundary of the Northwest Territories and the western part met the boundary of British Columbia. In 1882 it included most of the northern portion of the modern-day Province of Alberta. On the south, its boundary with the District of Alberta was the 18th correction line, approximately 55° north, now designated Township Road 710.

In 1895 it was expanded east to include the northern portion of the modern-day Province of Saskatchewan and part of northwestern modern-day Manitoba, and the southern boundary was moved northward.

== See also ==
- Territorial evolution of Canada
- District of Alberta
- District of Assiniboia
- District of Saskatchewan
