= Keewatin =

Keewatin may refer to:

== Places ==
=== Canada ===
- Keewatin, Ontario, a town amalgamated with Norman to form Kenora
- District of Keewatin, a former territory of Canada and former administrative district of the Northwest Territories
- Keewatin Region, a former region of the Northwest Territories (NWT)
  - Keewatin Region usage continued, informally, when this portion of the NWT was renamed Kivalliq Region and became part of the 1999 creation of Nunavut

=== United States ===
- Keewatin, Minnesota

== Other uses ==
- Keewatin Air, an airline that operates from Rankin Inlet, Nunavut, Canada
- Keewatin Community College, now University College of the North, in Northern Manitoba, Canada
- SS Keewatin, a Great Lakes steamship

== See also ==
- Kewadin (disambiguation)
- Keewaydin, Minneapolis, Minnesota
- Diocese of Keewatin, a former Anglican Church of Canada diocese
- Roman Catholic Archdiocese of Keewatin–Le Pas, a Roman Catholic archdiocese in Canada
- Keewatin ice sheet, formerly over North America
- Keewatin Railway, in northern Manitoba, Canada
