= Sandy Bar =

Sandy Bar may refer to:

- Sandy Bar, Manitoba, Canada
- Sandy Bar (actress) (born 1976), Israeli actress and model

== See also ==
- Sandy Barr
