= Canadian Elections Database =

Online database of Canadian election results

- Available in: English
- Founder: Anthony M. Sayers
- Services: Political science database
- Website: www.canadianelectionsdatabase.ca
- Commercial: No
- Launched: 2017
- Current status: Active

The Canadian Elections Database (CED) is an online database of Canadian federal, provincial, and territorial election results dating from Confederation in 1867. Developed as a research resource by Dr. Anthony M. Sayers, it organizes historical electoral information by election, political party, candidate, and electoral district.
