= Alfred Codd =

Canadian politician

Alfred Codd (March 19, 1843 – after 1896) was a Canadian pioneer medical doctor and politician. He served on the Council of Keewatin from 1876 to 1877 and was a well-respected physician in Manitoba.

== Early life ==
Alfred Codd was born in Norfolk County, England. His family moved to Ottawa early in his life.

== Political career ==
Codd had a short political career. He was appointed to serve on the Council of Keewatin, the short lived government for the District of Keewatin territory on November 25, 1876. Codd was appointed to the Council for his medical expertise by Alexander Morris to help deal with the Smallpox epidemic that was inflicting the territory.

== Late life ==
Codd was best friends with Lieutenant Governor John Christian Schultz. After Schultz died in 1896, Codd handled all the arrangements for his funeral, including accompanying Schultz's wife in a specially draped funeral train to return Schultz's remains to Winnipeg.
