= Council of Keewatin =

Unelected legislative body and territorial government

Type
- Type: Unicameral

History
- Established: November 25, 1876
- Disbanded: April 16, 1877

Leadership
- Lieutenant Governor: Alexander Morris; November 25, 1876; April 16, 1877

Structure
- Seats: 6
- Political groups: Independent

Elections
- Last election: Members chosen by appointment November 25, 1876.

Meeting place
- Fort Garry^{[B]}

The Council of Keewatin was an unelected legislative body and territorial government for the now defunct District of Keewatin in Canada. The District of Keewatin was created by the passage of the Keewatin Act on October 7, 1876 from a portion of Canada's North West Territories.^{[A]} Lieutenant Governor Alexander Morris convinced the government that the new territorial government of the North West Territories would be unable to effectively administer land to the north and east of Manitoba. Shortly after the District of Keewatin was formed a large group of Icelanders arrived, infected with smallpox which quickly spread to the indigenous First Nation population. The Government of Canada allowed the Council to be formed for the purpose of containing the smallpox epidemic. The Council also administered Indian treaty claims, immigrant land claims, Hudson's Bay Company trading post concerns as well as policing and health care. The Council lasted from November 25, 1876, until April 16, 1877, after which control of the territory was returned under federal authority.

The founder of the Council of Keewatin as well as the District of Keewatin was Alexander Morris. He selected and appointed the members to serve after being given permission by the Government of Canada. After the Council was disbanded in 1877, the legislation passed and departments organized by the council, such as the Boards of Health and Quarantine, continued to remain in force as late as 1878. The council was not reconstituted before the District of Keewatin was ceded back to the Northwest Territories in 1905.^{[A]} All matters of administration were handled by the Government of Canada and the Lieutenant Governor of Manitoba.

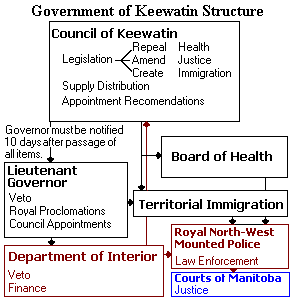
The structure and powers of the Government of Keewatin

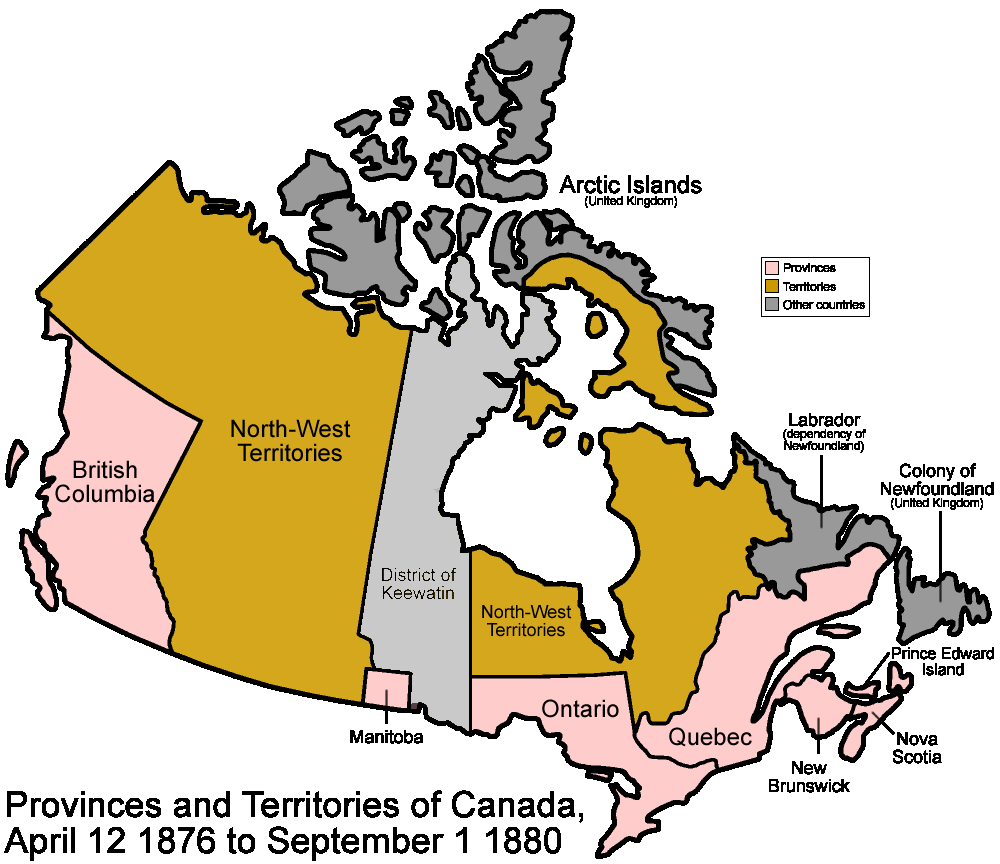
Map of Canada showing the District of Keewatin in 1876 (light gray)

== Location ==
The new district of Keewatin was separate from the North West Territories. Keewatin was an area extending north of the "postage stamp" province of Manitoba and the Canada–United States border, to the northern shores of Canada. To the west was the North-West Territories, to the east Ontario and again the North-West Territories. The Lieutenant Governor of Manitoba, Alexander Morris, served ex officio as Lieutenant Governor of the district.^{[G]}

== History ==
=== Treaty 5 land negotiations ===
Morris had fully expected the Sandy Bar Saulteaux to sign Treaty 5, The Lake Winnipeg Treaty in 1875. The purpose of the treaty would be to free up lands for immigration and settlement were then inhabited by the First Nations people. In return the First Nations would be granted reserve land, $5.00 per person annual payment, two oxen, one bull and four cows for each band, an annual payment of $50.00 salary for the Chief and three executive officers amounting to $70.00 total, as well as agricultural implements.^{[C]} The Chief also received a flag and medal.^{[D]}

=== Icelandic land grant ===
Icelanders emigrated from Iceland due to volcanic eruptions and shortage of grasslands, as well as a population increase which limited access to resources. In this era, Canada was attracting immigrants with cheap land under the Dominion Lands Act to settle western Canada. Lord Dufferin, Governor General of Canada, and Lieutenant Governor Alexander Morris granted the Icelanders territory at Sandy Bar, south of the Icelandic River. Between 235 and 285 Icelanders arrived at Willowpoint near Gimli on October 21, 1875; later that summer 1200 new immigrants from Iceland joined them. The Icelandic settlers elected a provisional town council of five members for the colony administration. The Dominion Government granted free transportation within Canada and settlement rights for a reserve known as New Iceland (Nýja Ísland), established by an Order in Council. 27,000 acres (110 km^{2}) was set aside for the New Iceland territory, which comprised 57.9 kilometres (36.0 mi) astride the western shore of Lake Winnipeg between Boundary Creek and White Mud River (Icelandic River) inclusive of Big Island (Hecla Island).^{[Map]} The Canadian government also promised the Icelanders local self-government, laws and judicial system and maintenance of their own school system. The Icelanders received a loan, which was offered to the settlement in stages. $15,000 was allotted to the first arrivals of 1875. Then a loan of $5,000 was extended to the summer immigrants to cover the cost of tickets, and $8,000 for agricultural tools and provisions. An extra $9,000 was paid to cover travel costs and three months' provisions. $25,000 was received in April which was used for seed and livestock: 250 head of cattle were purchased. October saw another loan of $18,000 for winter provisions, and 100 cows. Altogether, $80,000 was loaned to the Icelandic settlers, for which the 160 acres (65 ha) of settlement lands per settler was used as collateral.^{[F]} Their local council was dissolved on April 12, 1876, when the District of Keewatin was established by the Dominion Government under the North-West Territories Act. At this same time the territory of New Iceland underwent an official transfer to the District of Keewatin.

=== Land claim dispute ===
A land claim dispute arose between the Saulteaux family of John Ramsay and the Icelandic family of Ólafur Ólafsson. The Saulteaux believed the boundary line between the settlements was at the south shore of the river. Ólafur Ólafsson constructed his cabin on the river's north shore. J.A.N. Provencher supported Ólafsson. Ramsay brought his claim to Morris. Ramsay had recently lost his wife and four of his five children to smallpox and wanted the Saulteaux title to be recognized. The surveyor general and the Indian Affairs Department deputy superintendent both agreed that Ramsay was entitled to the land under the Indian Act. Treaty 5 was not signed by the Sandy Bar Saulteaux until 1876, after all appeals to federal agents regarding land claims failed.

=== Smallpox ===
The District of Keewatin had a severe epidemic of smallpox that started shortly after the territory's creation in the settlements of Gimli and Sandy Bar. The disease originated from a large group of Icelandic settlers who settled on the west shore of Lake Winnipeg. The Icelanders thought the first appearance of the epidemic was chickenpox and so it was not recognized as a deadly smallpox epidemic. The epidemic quickly spread to the local native population who were the predominant inhabitants of the territory.

== Council formation ==
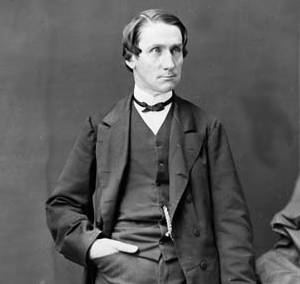
Alexander Morris, founder of both the District and the Council of Keewatin

Council of Keewatin members
Alfred Codd
William Hespeler
Albert G. Jackes
Gilbert McMicken
Joseph Provencher
William Osborne Smith

The Council of Keewatin was created and its first and only members were appointed and sworn in on November 25, 1876, by Lieutenant Governor Alexander Morris. Morris sent word to Ottawa by telegraph on November 24, 1876, asking for permission to set up the Council. The federal government responded quickly, allowing appointments and a proclamation to be printed the next day. Members of the Legislative Council were entitled to use the prefix The Honourable for the duration of their appointments. The first session of the Council opened on November 30, 1876, with Morris delivering the only throne speech. He emphasized the impending need for the council to deal with the smallpox epidemic in the fledgling territory. He detailed the history of the Temporary North-West Council, why the District of Keewatin was created, and outlined the powers of the Council of Keewatin.

The council sat in Fort Garry, Manitoba, even though this was outside of the boundaries of the District of Keewatin. Morris determined during the creation of the territory that the affairs of the District of Keewatin should be administered from Fort Garry until November 7, 1876. A total of six members were appointed to the Council. The law that created the territory allowed for a minimum of five members.

William Hespeler was appointed to serve on the Executive Council as a cabinet minister serving Lieutenant Governor Morris. His portfolio gave him the title of Territorial Immigration Agent. This office was needed to put measures and people in place to control access by settlers in the territory to help quarantine the smallpox epidemic.

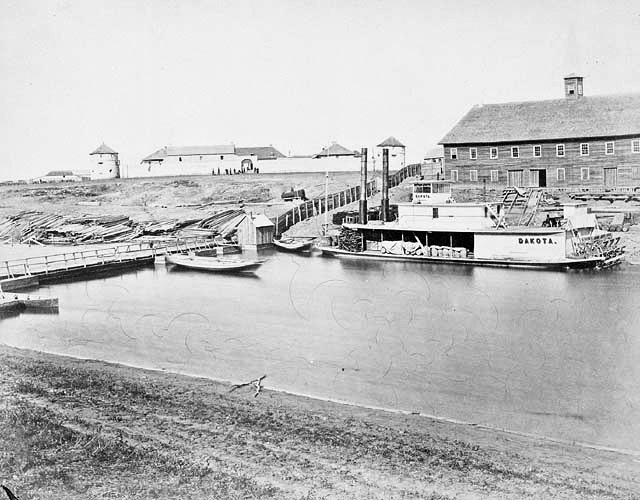
Fort Garry, Manitoba

The other members of the council were all chosen for their medical knowledge rather than a political background. The Council met at Early Government House in Fort Garry, which was also the home of Alexander Morris. The only clerk and secretary appointed to serve the council was F.G. Becher. The Council chose William Osborne Smith to chair the proceedings of the Council as well as the Board of Health.

=== Emergency quarantine ===
Fearing the disease would spread to Manitoba and the North West Territories, Morris advised the Department of the Interior that a territorial government needed to be set up to deal with the crisis. Morris appointed Dr Lynch to care for the Saulteaux smallpox epidemic. Sigtryggur Jonasson visited John Taylor to seek help, returning to New Iceland on November 8, 1877. Drs David Young, James S. Lynch, and A. Baldwin arrived at New Iceland and placed the area under quarantine as of November 27, 1876.

Smallpox and chickenpox virus rash distribution

A hospital was established in Gimli, Keewatin, and a quarantine station at Netley Creek. The Grassy Narrows House, a Hudson's Bay "outpost" also became an emergency hospital during the epidemic. The nearby Sandy Bar Band first nation community at Riverton was reached by Lynch and Young, and had been abandoned. The buildings were burned to contain the smallpox epidemic. Following the trail, they found the remaining 17 residents of the Sandy Bar band of about 60 people. The Sandy Bar Band fled to the east shore of Lake Winnipeg. This spread the epidemic and infected any bands living there. Ramsay guided the doctor to the various bands. At Sandy River 200 dead bodies were found. The Hudson's Bay Company warehouse, houses and teepees were all burned.

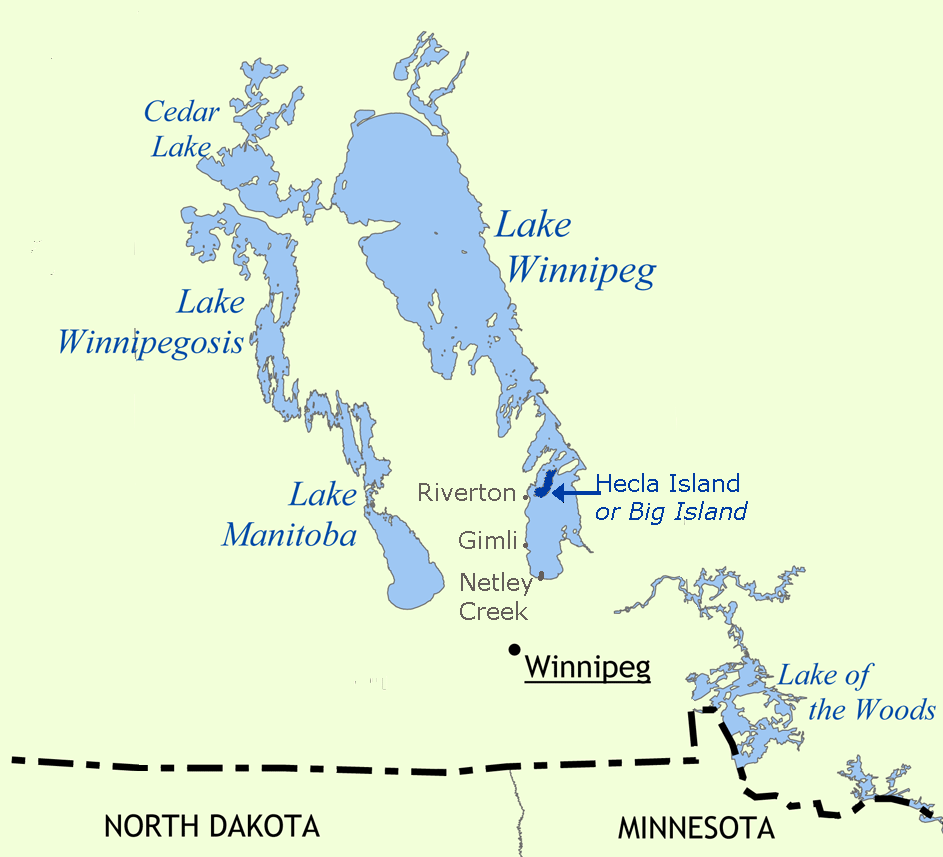
Initial smallpox outbreak area: Gimli, Netley Creek, Big Island (Hecla Island) and Riverton

After the throne speech was read on November 30, 1876, the council of Keewatin got to work quickly and passed its first piece of legislation. The Act was entitled An Act respecting Small Pox, and it served as the centrepiece of the council. The Act defined penalties and provisions to enforce Morris' proclamation outlawing intercourse by people outside the infected zone who did not have permission from the Council. The Act also offered advice and procedures for medical treatment of the disease. For the entire lifespan of the Council, all acts and regulations passed were geared towards dealing with smallpox. Everyone who wanted to do business with or visit the infected areas had to obtain permission from the council.

By April 1877, the smallpox epidemic had abated; however, the quarantine remained until June 20, 1877. The Icelanders demonstrated to Netley Creek, the southern border of New Island, requesting an end to the quarantine, which had been lifted the previous day, June 19. Of the 1200 Icelandic settlers, 102 died of smallpox. Fortunately, many of the immigrants had been immunized in Iceland before they traveled to Canada.

=== The fur trade ===
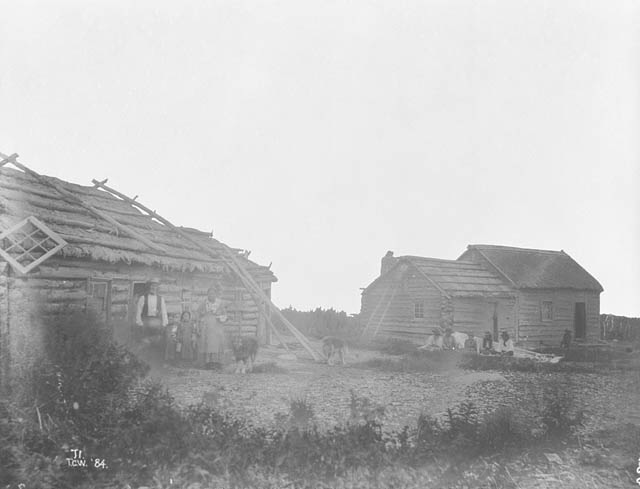
Hudson Bay Post on Lake Winnipeg

During the short existence of the Council, it became involved with regulating the fur trade. The Council feared furs contaminated with smallpox would be exported outside the quarantine zone. The Council invited people involved in the fur trade from Keewatin, Manitoba, and even the United States government to discuss the matter. The purpose of the meeting was to solicit testimony and gain the support of the industry, so that the Council could effectively draft, implement and enforce legislation.

The Council passed an Act on February 26, 1877, which was subsequently given Royal Assent. The measures adopted effectively quarantined furs from areas of the district deemed infected, and prevented their export. However, furs from areas in the District of Keewatin deemed to be free of smallpox could be exported as long as they did not come into contact with infected furs.

Before being exported from the district, all furs had to pass through depots manned by a quarantine officer appointed by the Board of Health. Any furs believed to have come into contact with parts of the district infected by smallpox were to be destroyed. This led to some problems for the Government of Canada after the Council was dissolved. Some people whose furs had been destroyed under these regulations applied to the Government for compensation, as no mechanism was put in place when the Act was drafted. These claims for compensation were considered, but ultimately ignored.

The Hudson's Bay Company had lost a full year in the northern fur trade and pressed for further steps to be taken to prevent another smallpox outbreak. Dr. D.W.J. Hagarty was appointed as medical superintendent of the Manitoba and North-West Superintendencies in October 1878. His mission was to vaccinate all Native persons resident in the Manitoba Superintendency. Every spring vaccinations were administered to the people who were not away hunting.

=== Board of Health ===
The Council of Keewatin established a powerful Board of Health for the territory. The Board of Health was run out of a head office in the city of Winnipeg^{[B]} and a local office was also established at the town of Gimli, in the District of Keewatin.

The Board of Health was led by Chief Health Officer Walter R. Nursey. All matters regarding quarantine within the district were handled by Edmund A. Struthers. The board was established to confine and treat the smallpox epidemic in the territory, and had wide powers to carry out this mission. The Board of Health established vaccination programs among native populations in the District of Keewatin based on legislation that continued well after the Council was dissolved. Mr Nursey was dispatched by Governor Morris in February 1877 with a quarantine party to Lake Winnipeg to establish a northern quarantine and sanitary cordon between the City of Winnipeg and the infected area. This party was to regulate the traffic in fur as well. The party arrived at Dog Head outpost in May 1877, having travelled the winter months on foot. There were no supplies, money, or instructions on arrival. The quarantine party returned to Winnipeg in July 1877 half starved.

== Dissolution ==
The council was short-lived: there was just one legislative session. Less than a year after its formation, the smallpox crisis in the District of Keewatin subsided. The Department of the Interior determined that a territorial government for the district was no longer needed. The entire council resigned and was effectively dissolved after being requested to do so on April 16, 1877, by Secretary of State James Aikins. Aikins had the council resign as a cost-saving measure; also he did not want members of the council to abuse the powers of their appointments.

Control of the District of Keewatin returned to the federal government under the management of the Department of the Interior in cooperation with the Lieutenant Governor of Manitoba. The council was not reconstituted until the remaining portions of the territory were once again merged with the Northwest Territories in 1905. The land formally comprising the territory is today governed by the provincial and territorial governments of Ontario, Manitoba and Nunavut.

== Debate of the Senate of the Dominion of Canada ==
On February 25, 1878, the Honourable Mr Girard presented to the Governor-General the correspondence between the Government of Canada, the Council of Keewatin, and the Government of Manitoba regarding the smallpox claims and accounts. The Honourable Mr Pelletier replied that the accounts were examined by Honourables Mr. Norquay and Mr. Begg representing the Province of Manitoba, and Messrs. McCall and Graham representing the Dominion Government. The resolution would be that the Government of Keewatin (Dominion Government) would pay $20,000 and the Government of Manitoba $5,000 in settlement of claims. $20,000 is equivalent to $667,000 in present-day terms and $5,000 is equivalent to $167,000.

== New Iceland ==
New Iceland elected administrators again on February 13, 1877. Under the provisional constitution, the colony was named Vatnsthing (Lake assembly). It was divided into four districts each with its own administration: Vidinesbyggd (Willow Point District), Arnesbyggd (Arnes District), Flotsbyggd (River District) and Mikleyjarbyggd (Big Island District). When the quarantine ended in July 1877, it was too late to seed. The Federal government voted to survey a road in the colony, with an allotment of $8,000 to employ labourers. Workers were paid 60 to 70 cents a day along with their daily expenses. The women looking after camps were also similarly paid.^{[F]} This monetary income enabled settlers to remain at New Iceland till the following agricultural season of 1878. New Iceland became a part of the province of Manitoba in 1881. This regional Icelandic government continued until 1887.

== First Nation ==
During Treaty 5 negotiations, Norway House Band requested the Grassey Narrows area which was the White Mud River – Icelandic River area which was a portion of New Iceland. The Norway House Band (Kinosao Sipi Cree Nation) agreed to settle at Fisher River. Norway House Band was a Western Woods Cree community of the Algonquian (Central) language group. The Sandy Bar group wanted also a reserve in the Grassey Narrows area. Their settlement area was on the northern edge of New Iceland. The Sandy Bar Saulteaux/Cree of the Algonquian (Central) language group may have been a portion of the Peguis-St. Peters Band. This group was almost entirely decimated during the smallpox epidemic, those who were left were re-located. The Island band requested a reserve on Big Island (later renamed Hecla Island). This band settled at Hollow Water River and renounced the traditional lands at Big Island. Blood Vein River, Big Island, Sandy Bar, Thickfoot and Jack-Fish Head bands met with Messrs. Reid and Howard in October 1876 and requested lands for their reserves. The Dog Head Band requested a point opposite the Dog Head River. Similarly, the Blood Vein River Band made a request for lands at the mouth of the Blood Vein River. The Big Island Band at this time requested the lands at the mouth of Badthroat River. The Jack-Fish Head Band made requests for the north side of Jack Head Point at the Lobstick River. The Sandy Bar Band, a branch of St. Peter's Band requested White Mud River site on the west Side of Lake Winnipeg. The Blood Vein River Band was a Saulteaux (Ojibwa) first nation of the Algonquian (Central) language family. The Moose Lake (Big Island) band which signed Treaty 5 in 1875 was a Cree first nation of the Algonquian (Central) language group. The Big Island band which signed Treaty 2 in 1877 was an Ojibwa first nation of the Algonquian (Central) language group.^{[E]}

== Notes ==
^{A} During this time frame the spelling was North West Territories. Northwest as one word was a 1905 adoption.
^{B} Winnipeg: Established 1738 as Fort Rouge; renamed 1822 Fort Garry; incorporated in 1873 as the City of Winnipeg.
^{C} $5.00 is equivalent to $150.00, $50.00 to $1,470, $70.00 to $2,050 in present day terms.
^{D} The previous Lieutenant Governor Archibald had negotiated Treaty 1 (1871) and 2 (1871) and these treaties were revised by Alexander Morris who was Chief Justice of the Manitoba Court of Queen's Bench at this time. Treaty 3 through 6 were negotiated directly by Morris. Treaty 3, the Northwest Angle Treaty was signed in 1873 by the Lake of the Woods Saulteaux. Treaty 4 was signed in 1874; Treaty 5 (The Lake Winnipeg Treaty), 1875; and Treaty 6, 1876.
^{E} Treaty 6 signed 1876 and Treaty 10 signed 1908 negotiated land claims with the more northerly portions of Keewatin.
^{F} $5,000.00 is equivalent to $147,000 in present day terms, $8,0000.00 to $235,000; $9,000.00 to $264,000; $15,000.00 to $440,000; $18,000.00 to $528,000, $25,000.00 to $733,000; $80,000.00 to $2.35 million in present day terms.
^{G} This topographic map of Canada shows the location of Lake Winnipeg and Lake Manitoba just north of Winnipeg near the US Canada border. It is located in the very south area of the District of Keewatin in respect to the northern shore line of Canada. The council during this time was involved with interlake region concerns which were in the southern area of the District of Keewatin, and not of the northern region. The New Iceland and local bands who were part of theTreaty 5 land negotiations were both situated within the interlake region of the District of Keewatin.
^{Map} Map of New Iceland along shore of Lake Winnipeg
