= Kewadin =

Kewadin may refer to:

- Kewadin, Michigan
- Kewadin Casinos
- Kewadin Casino, Hotel and Convention Center

== See also ==
- Keewatin (disambiguation)
