= District of Saskatchewan =

Canadian administrative district (1882–1905)

Coordinates: 57.07°N 106.09°W

- District of North-West Territories
- 1882–1905
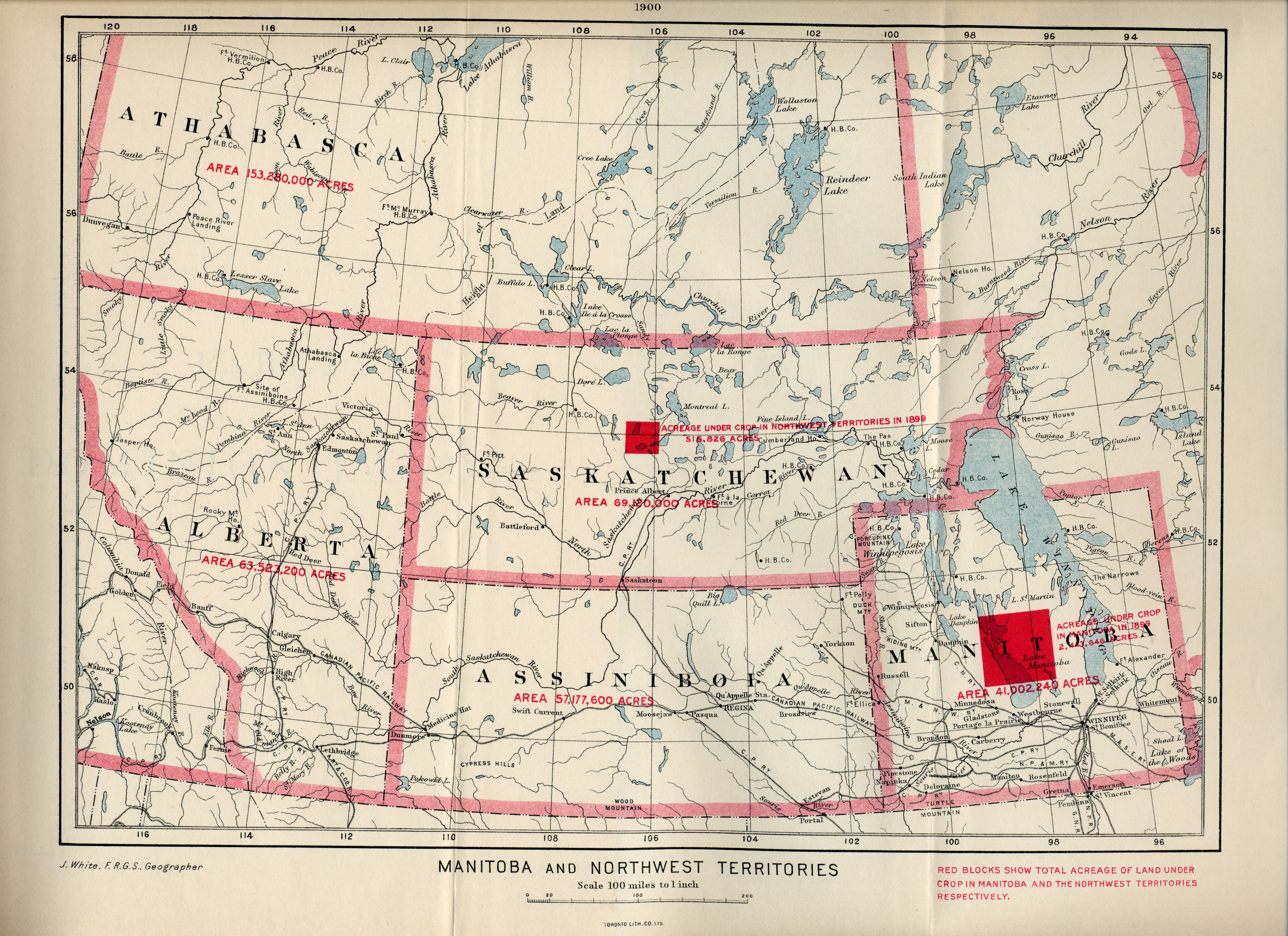
- A 1900 map showing the District of Saskatchewan at its greatest extent.
- History
  - Established: 1882
  - Disestablished: 1905
- Today part of: Alberta, Manitoba, Saskatchewan

The District of Saskatchewan was a regional administrative district of Canada's North-West Territories. Formed in 1882, it was later enlarged then abolished with the creation of the provinces of Saskatchewan and Alberta in 1905. Much of the area was incorporated into the province of Saskatchewan. The western part became part of Alberta, and the eastern part (which extended to Lake Winnipeg) is now part of Manitoba.

The conflicts during the North-West Rebellion of 1885 occurred in the District of Saskatchewan.

== Settlements ==
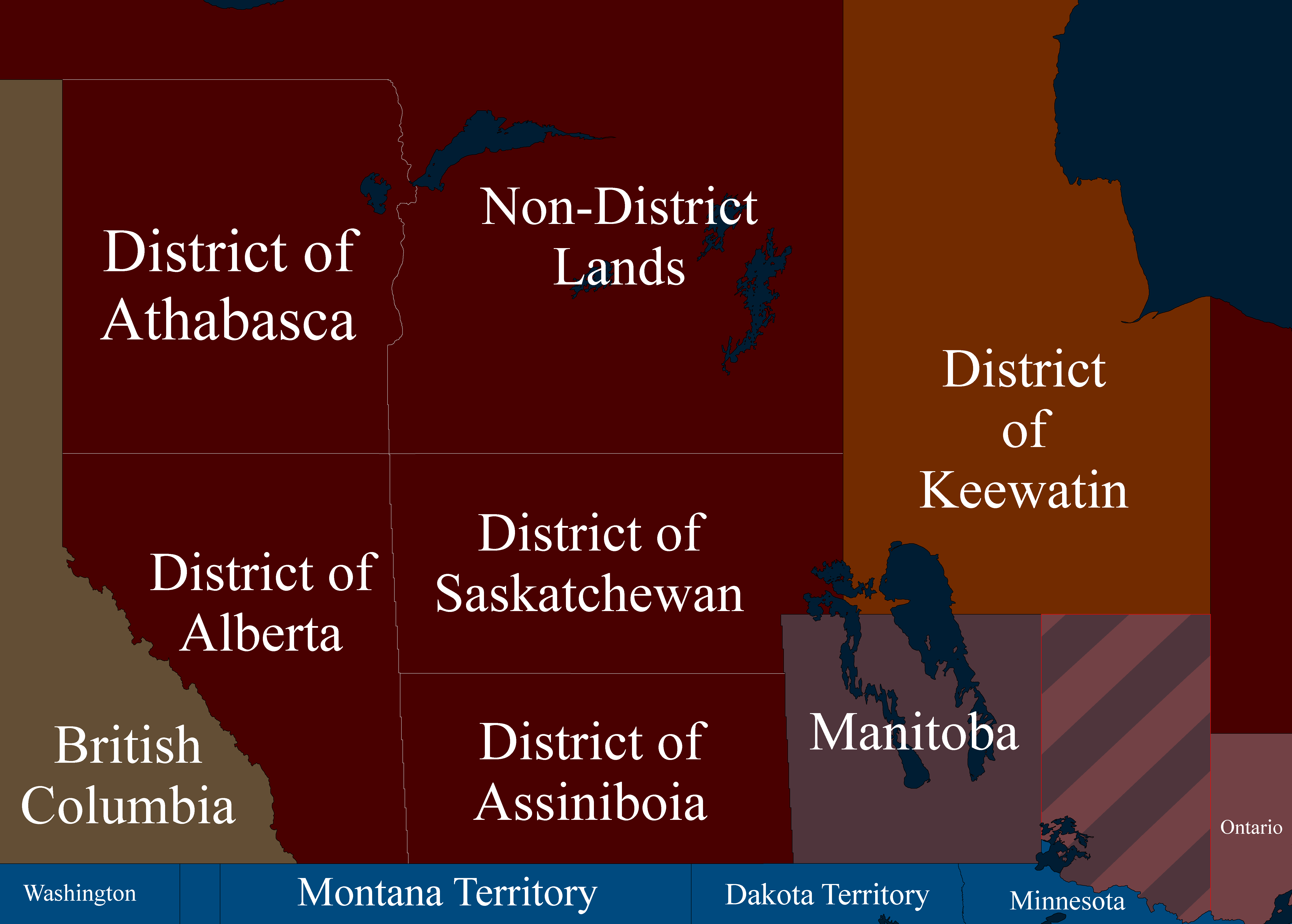
A map of the Canadian Prairies showing the Districts of the North-West Territories in 1882.

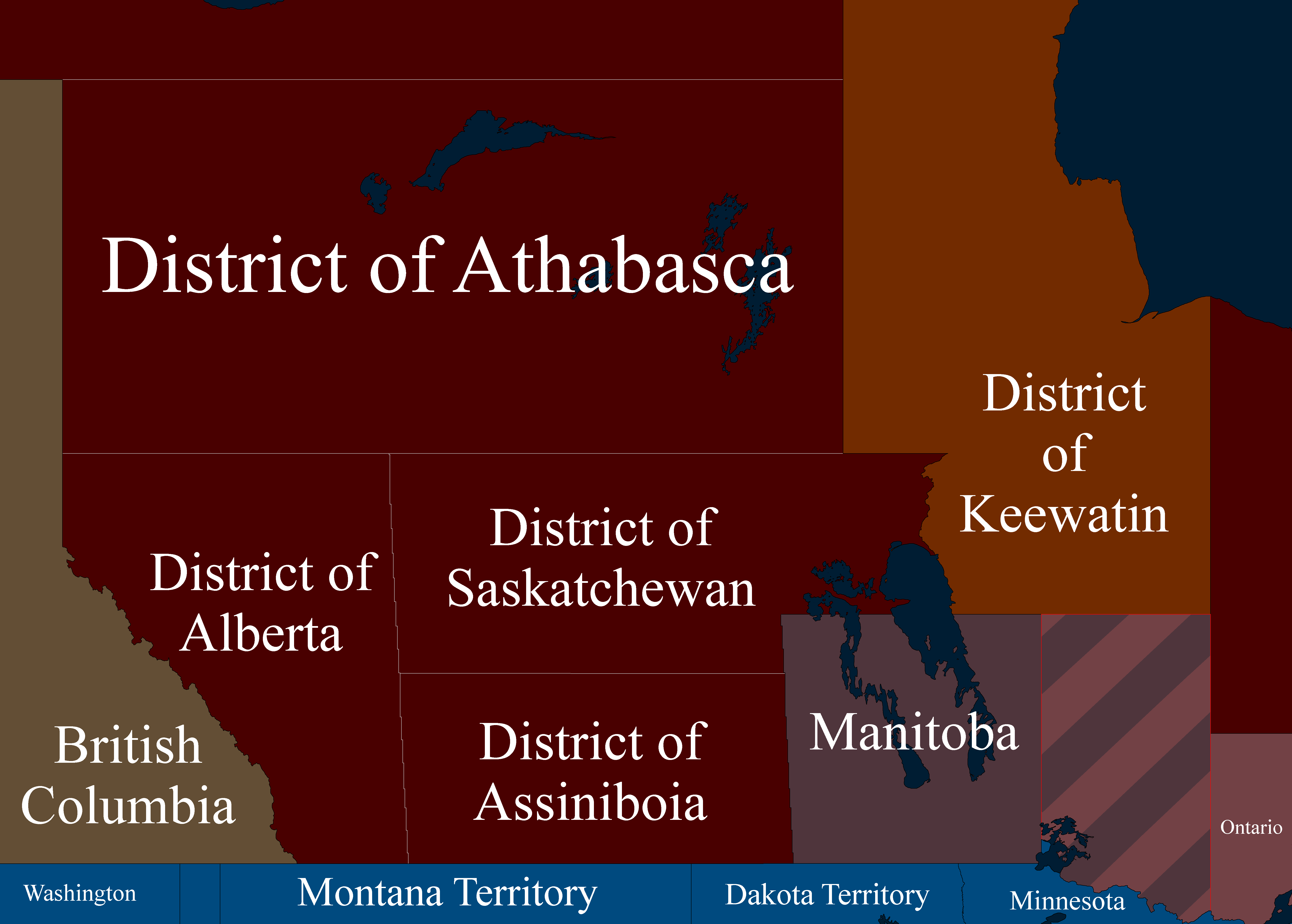
A map of the Canadian Prairies showing the Districts of the North-West Territories in 1886.

The District of Saskatchewan in 1888 included the five French speaking settlements of St. Laurent, Fish Creek, Duck Lake, Batoche and St. Louis de Langevin in the area of the South Branch of the Saskatchewan River and the settlements of Green Lake, La Ronge, Red Deer Lake (56-25-W2), Nut Lake (39-23-W2), Birch River, Fort à la Corne, Snake Plains (northwest of Carleton near Muskeg Lake), Birch Hills (46-23-W3), Clarke's Crossing (38-4-W3), Shell River (15 miles northwest of Prince Albert), Carrot River, Cumberland House, The Pas, Grand Rapids, Battleford, Fort Pitt, Frog Lake, Onion Lake, Cold Lake, Fort Carlton, Humboldt, Saskatoon.

The district was home to Cree people of Treaty 4, Treaty 5 and Treaty 6 who lived on Indian reserves and a small band of Dene who lived in the northwest section around Cold Lake.

== Population ==
The population of the District of Saskatchewan in 1885 was 10,595. The Prince Albert sub-district had a population of 5,373 people which included the Southbranch settlements with about 1,300. To the west was the Battleford sub-district with 3,603 people and to the east the Carrot River sub-district with 1,770.

The largest settlement and the capital of the district was Prince Albert with about 800 people followed by Battleford with about 500 people.

== Boundaries ==
Most of the boundaries of the district in 1882 were defined by lines of the Dominion Land Survey.

- On the south, the 9th Correction Line, about 51.9687° north, then the line between Ranges 29 and 30 west of the Principal Meridian (a staircase-shaped line about 101° west), then the 12th Base Line, about 52.84° north
- On the west, the line between Ranges 10 and 11 west of the Fourth Meridian (a staircase-shaped line about 112° west)
- On the north, the 18th Correction Line, about 55.1122° north
- On the east, the west shore of Lake Winnipeg and the Nelson River.

The southwest corner of the Saskatchewan District is commemorated by a cairn 10 km south of Coronation, Alberta.

== See also ==
- Territorial evolution of Canada
- District of Alberta
- District of Assiniboia
- District of Athabasca
- Lorne (electoral district)
- Provisional District of Saskatchewan
