= District of Mackenzie =

Former district of the Northwest Territories, Canada

Coordinates: 61°40′N 114°00′W

- District of North-West Territories
- 1895–1999
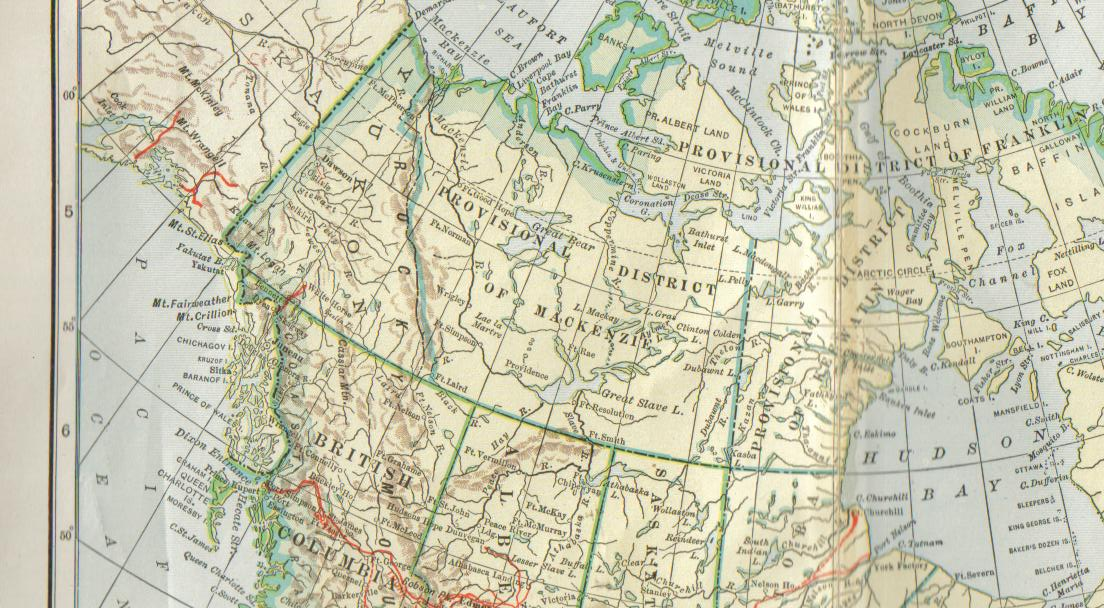
- District of Mackenzie c. 1905
- History
  - Established: 1895
  - Disestablished: 1999
- Today part of: Northwest Territories, Nunavut

The District of Mackenzie was a regional administrative district of Canada's Northwest Territories. The district consisted of the portion of the Northwest Territories directly north of British Columbia, Alberta, and Saskatchewan on Canada's mainland.

== History ==
The District of Mackenzie was sparsely populated; the population was just 6,507 in 1911, but grew to 9,316 by 1931. By 1960, the population had increased to 12,492.

Along with the District of Keewatin and the District of Franklin, it was one of the last remaining districts of the old Northwest Territories before the formation of Nunavut in 1999, at which point it ceased to exist. As an administrative district of the NWT it had ceased to function several years prior to division.

Today the area that formerly comprised the District of Mackenzie is mostly included in the Northwest Territories (which is no longer subdivided into districts). The remainder, along with all of Keewatin and most of Franklin, is in Nunavut.

== See also ==
- Territorial evolution of Canada
