= Keewatin Region =

Region of the Northwest Territories until 1999

Coordinates: 63°N 98°W

- District of Northwest Territories
- 1905–1999
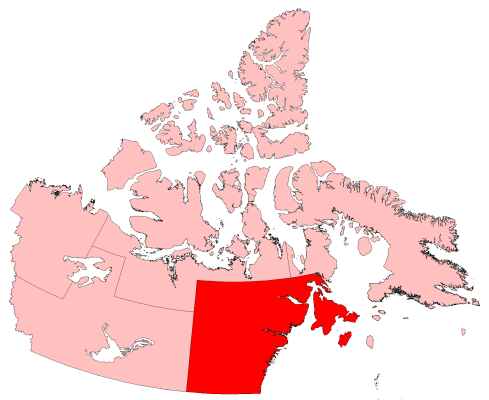
- Pre-1999 Keewatin Region
- History
  - Established: 1905
  - Disestablished: 1999
| Preceded by | Succeeded by |
| District of Keewatin | Nunavut |
- Today part of: Nunavut

The Keewatin Region was a district of the Northwest Territories, in use as an administrative and statistical division until the creation of Nunavut in 1999. The majority of Keewatin Region fell on the Nunavut side of the boundary and was reconstituted as Kivalliq Region within the new territory, while a strip on the region's west side remaining in the NWT was transferred to Fort Smith Region. Kivalliq continues to be referred to as "Keewatin Region, Nunavut" in some circumstances, such as by Statistics Canada.

The regional seat of the Keewatin Region was Rankin Inlet.
