= District of Franklin =

Former district of the Canadian Northwest Territories

- District of North-West Territories
- 1895–1999
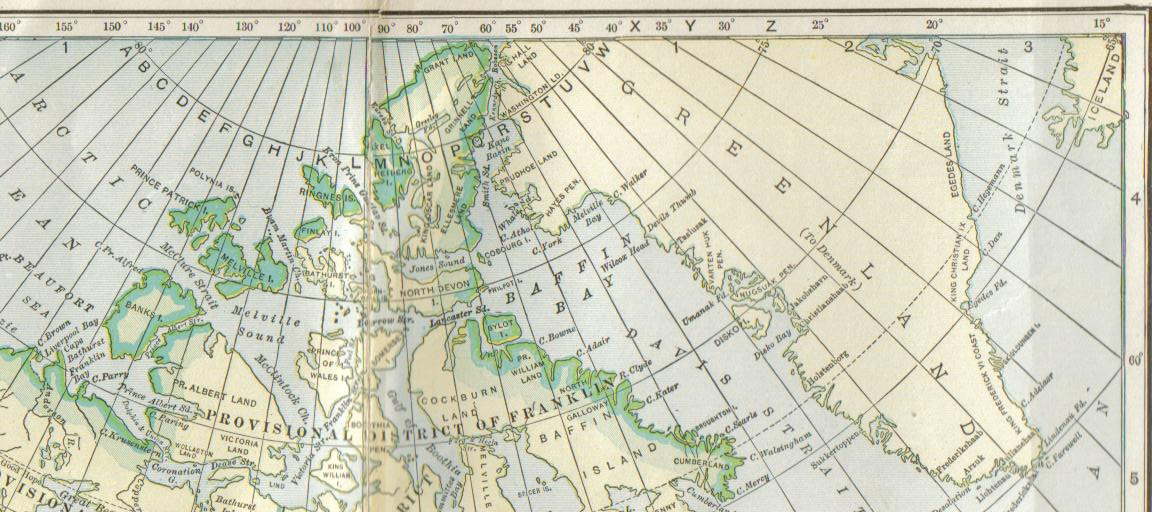
- District of Franklin in 1902
- History
  - Established: 1895
  - Disestablished: 1999
- Today part of: Nunavut

The District of Franklin was a regional administrative district of Canada's Northwest Territories. The district consisted of the Canadian high Arctic Islands, notably Ellesmere Island, Baffin Island, and Victoria Island. The district also contained the mainland Melville Peninsula and Boothia Peninsula.

English navigators Martin Frobisher and Henry Hudson were the first Europeans known to have visited the area (although Viking sailors, coming from Greenland, may have made occasional landings and hunting treks on Baffin Island in the 11th and 12th centuries). The area was transferred from British colonial authority to the Government of Canada in 1894 and named after Sir John Franklin in the following year; however, the northernmost islands were claimed by Norway until the year 1930.

Along with the District of Keewatin and the District of Mackenzie, it was one of the three districts of the old Northwest Territories before the formation of Nunavut in 1999, at which point the district ceased to exist, although as an administrative district of the NWT it had ceased to function several years prior to the splitting off of Nunavut. The area of the former District of Franklin was divided between the remaining portion of the Northwest Territories and Nunavut. In the process, Victoria Island was divided with approximately two-thirds of its area falling in Nunavut, and several other islands were also divided between the two territories.
