= Sandy Bar, Manitoba =

Coordinates: 52°25′N 97°7′W

Sandy Bar is a small town located on Lake Winnipeg in Manitoba, Canada.

== History ==
Sandy Bar was founded in the 1870s. It was hit by a severe out break of smallpox brought by Icelandic settlers who settled at Gimli. The first and only clerk and secretary appointed to serve the council was F.G. Becher.
