= Baffin Region =

Region of the Northwest Territories until 1999

Coordinates: 74°08′51″N 086°18′49″W

The Baffin Region was a region of the Northwest Territories, in use as an administrative and statistical division until the creation of Nunavut in 1999. In 1967, it was created as the Baffin Region, Northwest Territories. The large majority of the Baffin Region fell on the Nunavut side of the boundary and was reconstituted within the new territory as the Qikiqtaaluk Region (also referred to as Baffin Region in some contexts). Several of the islands on the region's west side that remained in the NWT, including Eglinton Island, Prince Patrick Island and parts of Melville Island, were transferred to the Inuvik Region.

== See also ==
- Baffin Island
