= Assiniboia =

Two historical districts of Canada's Northwest Territories

Assiniboia District refers to two historical districts of Canada's Northwest Territories. The name is taken from the Assiniboine First Nation.

== Historical usage ==
For more information on the history of the provisional districts, see also Districts of the Northwest Territories

=== (Old) District of Assiniboia ===
The District of Assiniboia was a name used to describe the Red River Colony, mainly for official purposes, between 1812 and 1869. Nominally the district included all of the territory granted in the Selkirk Concession. However, much of this was ceded to the United States by the Treaty of 1818, and in 1838 the district was redefined as the circular region within 50 miles (80 km) of Fort Garry, which was at the confluence of the Red and Assiniboine rivers. The actual area of settlement, centred at present-day Winnipeg, was limited to the Red River valley between Lower Fort Garry and Pembina, and the Assiniboine River valley between Winnipeg and Portage la Prairie. The district was governed by a Hudson's Bay Company-appointed Governor of Assiniboia, who was advised by members of the Council of Assiniboia.

In 1869 Rupert's Land, including the District of Assiniboia, was transferred to Canada without consultation of the residents of the settlement. This, and the arrival of Canadian surveyors, led to the Red River Rebellion, in which a provisional government and Legislative Assembly of Assiniboia was established by Métis leader Louis Riel to negotiate the admission of the district as a province of Canada. The original proposal, which suggested that the new province consist of all of the fertile belt between Winnipeg and British Columbia, was rejected by the Canadian government as it conflicted with their plans to manage the settlement of the North-West Territories directly. As a compromise, a small part of the district, consisting mainly of the settled areas, was admitted to Canada as the Province of Manitoba in 1870, though the federal government retained control of Crown land and natural resources until 1930. In some accounts of the history of Manitoba, the term Old Assiniboia is used to describe the pre-1870 settlement, though the terms Red River Colony, Red River Settlement and Selkirk Settlement are more common.

=== District of Assiniboia ===
District of Assiniboia
- District of North-West Territories
- 1882–1905
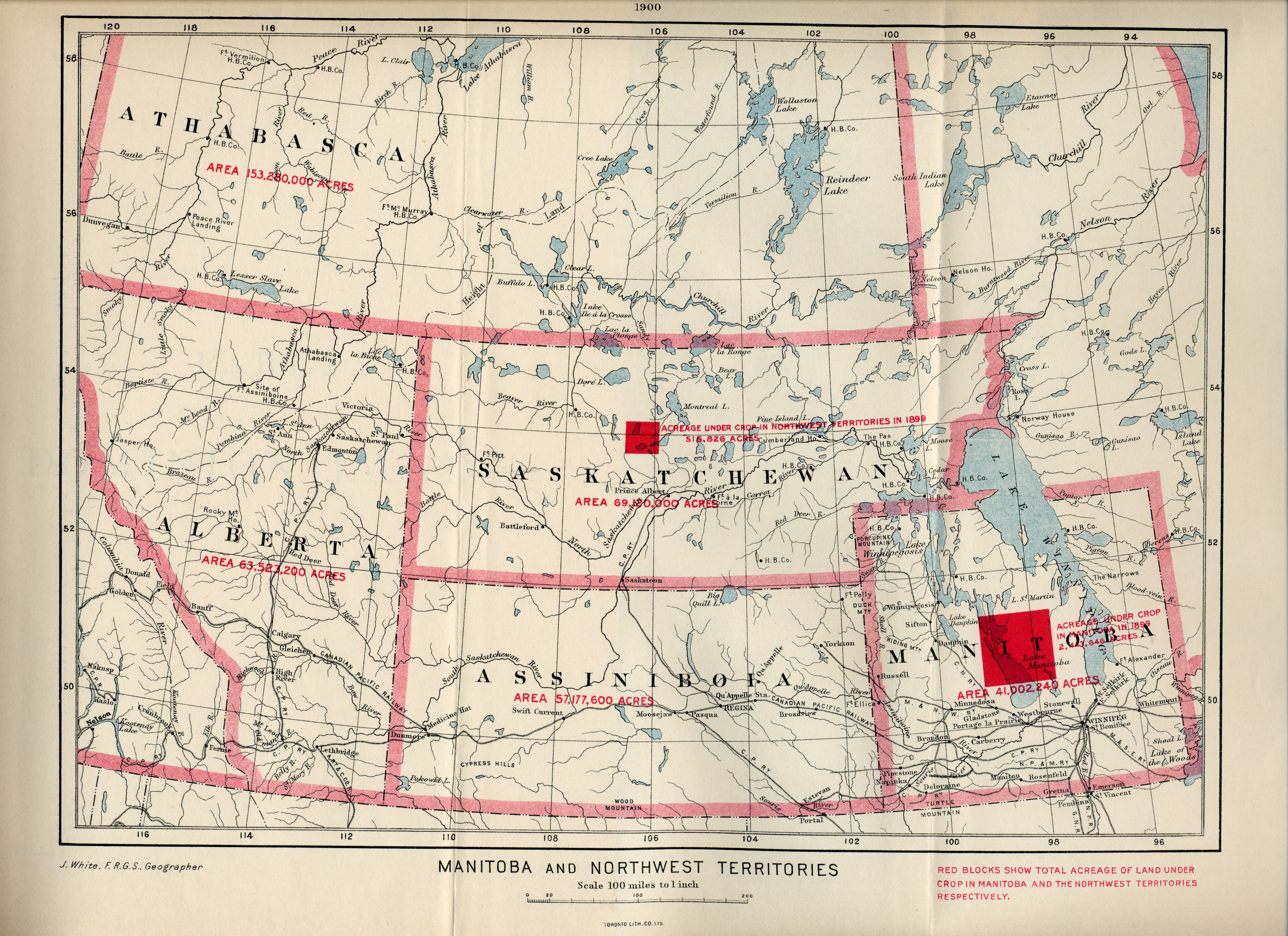
- A 1900 map showing the boundaries of the second District of Assiniboia (bottom centre).
- History
  - Established: 1882
  - Disestablished: 1905
- Today part of: Alberta, Saskatchewan

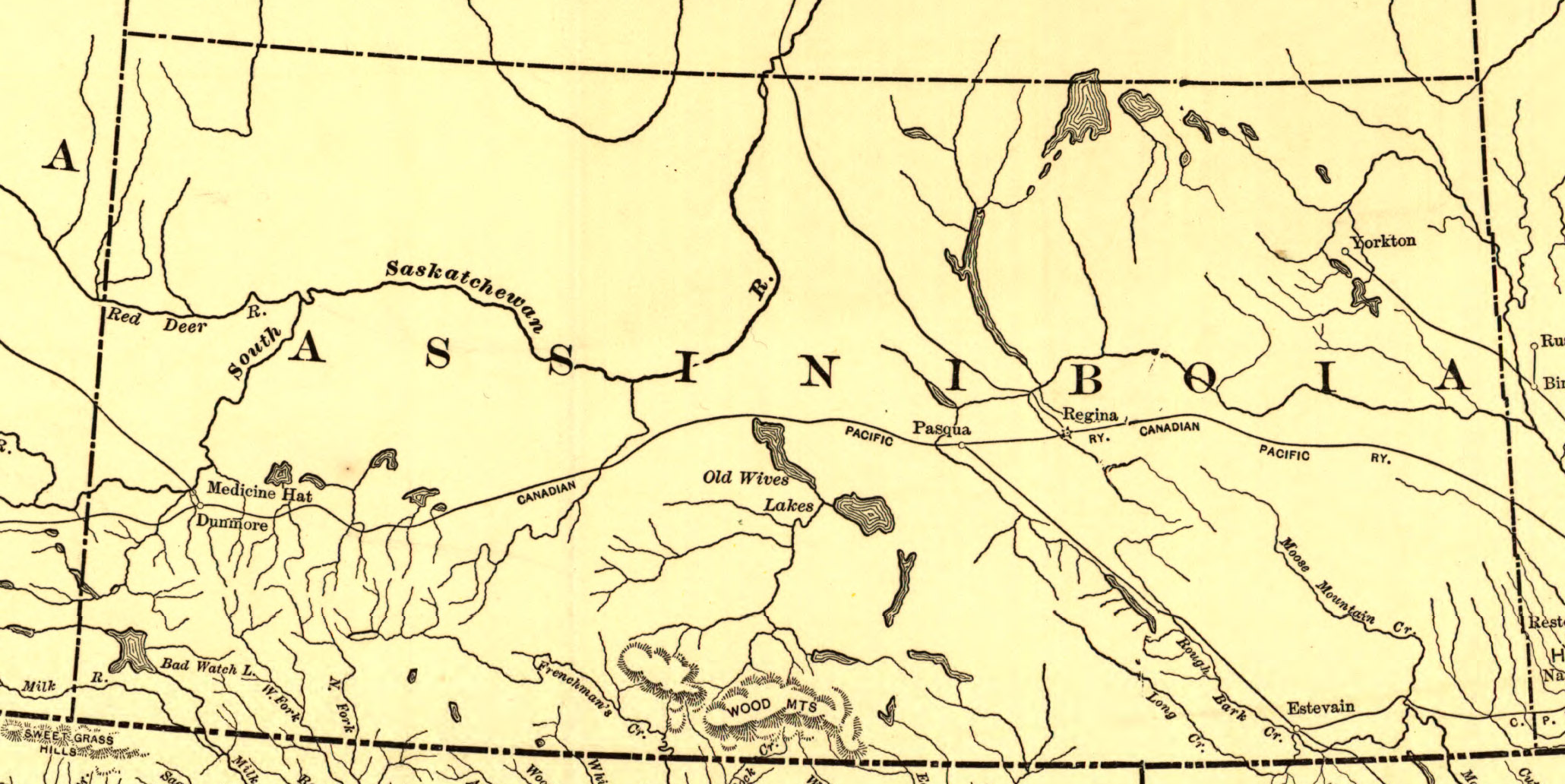
A 1900 railroad map with more detail on the district.

The (Second) District of Assiniboia was later created (1882) as a regional administrative district of Canada's North-West Territories. Most of it was absorbed into the Province of Saskatchewan in 1905, except for the westernmost quarter, which became part of Alberta.

The east boundary of the district coincided with the modern Manitoba–Saskatchewan boundary, the line between the 29th and 30th ranges west of the First Meridian of the Dominion Land Survey. This boundary has jogs at each correction line. Any roads built on this boundary are now designated Road 174 West under the Manitoba system or Range Road 1300 under the Saskatchewan system.

The north boundary was the 9th Correction Line, approximately 52° north, now also designated Township Road 350.

The west boundary was the line between the 10th and 11th ranges west of the Fourth Meridian. This line, now designated Range Road 110, has jogs at each correction line. The northwest corner of the Assiniboia District is commemorated by a cairn 10 km south of Coronation, Alberta.

Between 1876 and 1883, Battleford (in the District of Saskatchewan) was the territorial capital of the North-West Territories. The territorial capital was moved to Regina, in Assiniboia, in 1883, and on the formation of the province of Saskatchewan in 1905, Regina became the capital of the province. Its location was chosen by Edgar Dewdney, the territorial lieutenant-governor. Dewdney had reserved for himself substantial land adjacent to the Canadian Pacific Railway line on the site of what became the town, and thereby considerably enriched himself. This was the occasion of a considerable scandal in the early days of the Territories.

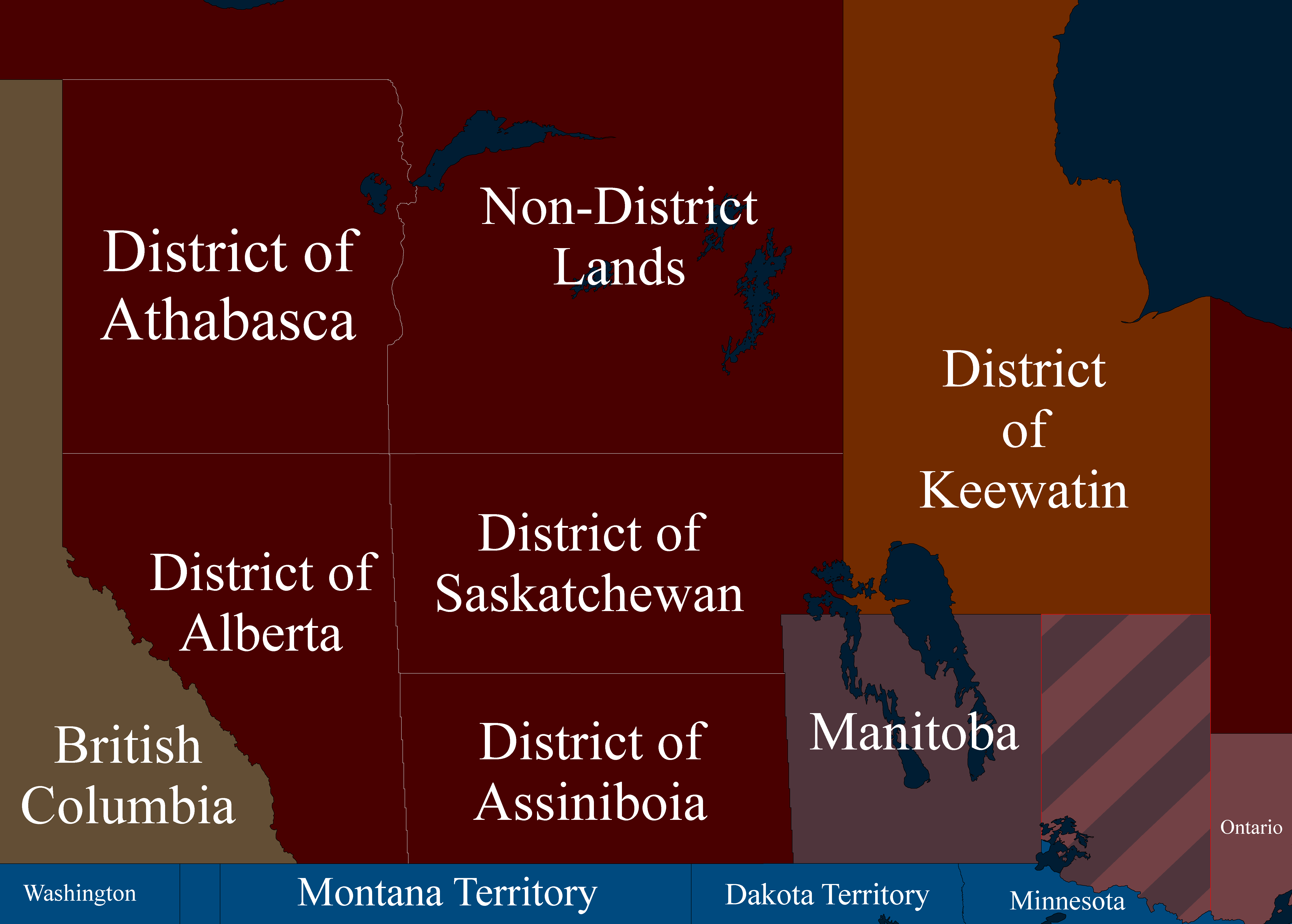
A map of the Canadian Prairies showing the Districts of the North-West Territories in 1882.

The District of Assiniboia survived in its original geographical configuration as the Anglican Diocese of Qu'Appelle until the 1970s when the portion of the diocese (and former District of Assiniboia) lying within the province of Alberta was ceded to the Diocese of Calgary.

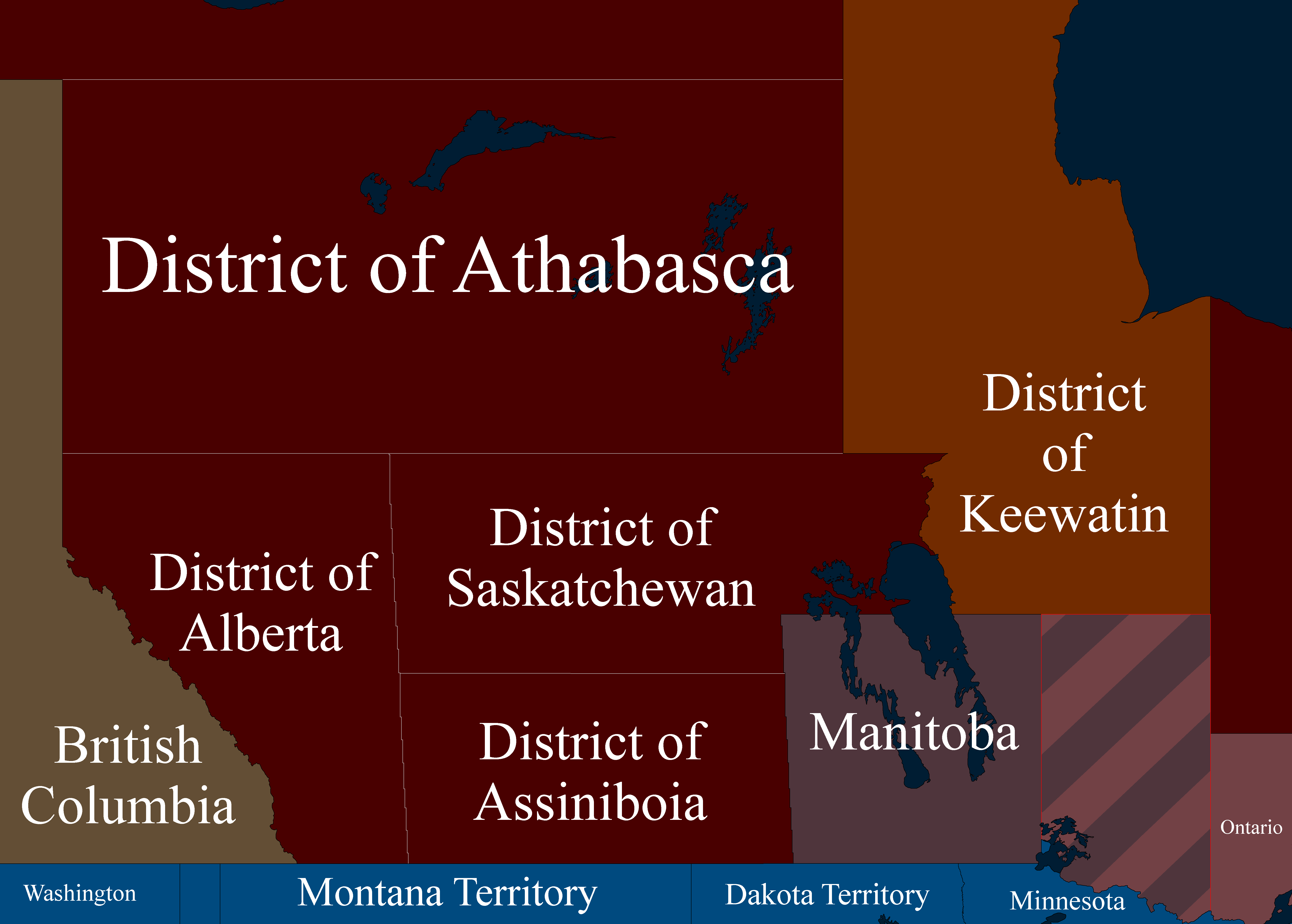
A map of the Canadian Prairies showing the Districts of the North-West Territories in 1886.

== See also ==
- List of place names in Canada of Indigenous origin
