= Territorial evolution of Canada =

The history of post-confederation Canada began on July 1, 1867, when the British North American colonies of Canada, New Brunswick, and Nova Scotia were united to form a single Dominion within the British Empire. Upon Confederation, the Province of Canada was immediately split into the provinces of Ontario and Quebec. In 1870, Canada acquired the vast expanse of the continent controlled by the Hudson's Bay Company, which was eventually divided into new territories and provinces. British Columbia joined in 1871, and Prince Edward Island in 1873. Canada evolved into a fully sovereign state by 1982.

Before being part of British North America, the constituents of Canada consisted of the former colonies of Canada and Acadia from within New France which had been ceded to Great Britain in 1763 as part of the Treaty of Paris. French Canadian nationality was maintained as one of the "two founding nations" and legally through the Quebec Act which ensured the maintenance of the Canadian French language, Catholic religion, and French civil law within Canada, a fact which remains true today.

Canada today has ten provinces and three territories; it only lost significant territory in the border dispute over Labrador with the Dominion of Newfoundland, which later joined Canada as the 10th province.

== Timeline ==
Date	Event	Change
July 1, 1867	The Dominion of Canada was formed by the United Kingdom from three provinces of British North America: (Note: The borders of Canada were, from Passamaquoddy Bay: up the St. Croix River to its source; north to the St. John River; up that to the St. Francis River; up that to its source at Lake Pohenegamook; southwesterly to a point on the north branch of the St. John River 10 miles distant from the main branch; then a line from there to where the St. John River crosses 46°25′ north; up the river to its source; then along the height of the land to the source of Halls Stream; down that to 45° north; west along that to the St. Lawrence River; up that to the Great Lakes, passing through Lake Ontario, the Niagara River, Lake Erie, the Detroit River, Lake St. Clair, the St. Clair River, Lake Huron, and Lake Superior, to the Pigeon River; up the height of the land around to a point north of Blanc-Sablon; then south to the Gulf of St. Lawrence. The country included Cape Breton Island and Anticosti Island, but excluded nearby Newfoundland and Prince Edward Island.): The Province of Canada, which was split at the Ottawa River into the provinces of Ontario to the west, and Quebec to the east (Note: The exact border between of Ontario and Quebec was: from where the St. Lawrence River leaves the border with the United States; down the river to a marker on the north bank of Lake Saint Francis at the border of the township of Lancaster (now part of South Glengarry) and the seigneurie of New Longueuil; north 34° west along the boundary to the western angle of New Longueuil; north 25° east along the boundary to the Ottawa River; up that to its source; then north to the height of the land.); New Brunswick (Note: The border between New Brunswick and Quebec was, from the outlet of Beau Lake: a line to a point one mile south of the southern point of Long Lake; a line to the southern point of the fiefs of Madawaska and Temiscouata; along that southeast boundary to its southeast angle; north to an east-west line tangent to the height of the land dividing the Rimouski River and the St. John River; east to a north-south line tangent to the height of the land dividing the Rimouski River from the Restigouche River; north to 48° north; east to the Patapédia River; down that to the Restigouche River; and down that to Chaleur Bay.); Nova Scotia (Note: The border between New Brunswick and Nova Scotia was, from the Bay of Fundy; up the Missaguash River to a post near Black Island; then a complex of lines through and past Black Island, eventually reaching Tidnish Bridge; then down the Tidnish River to Baie Verte.); The capital was established at Ottawa. Canada inherited territorial disputes with the United States over Machias Seal Island and North Rock, which remain disputed up to the present.	Disputes:
July 15, 1870	The United Kingdom transferred most of its remaining land in North America to Canada, with the North-Western Territory and Rupert's Land becoming the North-West Territories. (Note: The new borders of Canada were, from the existing Canada-United States border at the Pigeon River: up the Boundary Waters to the Rainy River and the northwest angle of the Lake of the Woods; south to 49° north; west to the ridge of the Rocky Mountains; north along that to 120° west; north to 60° north; west to the disputed border with the United States described as the "summit of the mountains parallel to the coast"; north along that to 141° west; then north to the Arctic Ocean. The border then followed the coastline, leaving it to include the half of Baffin Bay within the Hudson Bay watershed, then back to the mainland; it then ran down the "Coasts of Labrador", the extent of which were disputed, until it reached the existing Canada–Newfoundland border at Blanc-Sablon.) The British government made the transfer after Canada and the Hudson's Bay Company agreed to the terms, including a payment of £300,000 from Canada to the Company. Due to a vague description and lack of quality surveying, part of the western border with the United States was unclear and disputed. Canada disagreed with the United Kingdom over the extent of Labrador that remained with Newfoundland Colony, citing the historical use of the term "Coasts of Labrador." A rectangular area of the newly acquired region around the city of Winnipeg was made the province of Manitoba. (Note: Manitoba was bounded by 96° west, 99° west, 50°30′ north, and 49° north.)	Disputes:
July 20, 1871	The British colony of British Columbia joined Canada as the sixth province. (Note: The new borders of Canada were, from the existing Canada-United States border where the ridge of the Rocky Mountains crosses 49° north: west to the Pacific Ocean, through the Strait of Juan de Fuca, around Vancouver Island and Haida Gwaii to the Dixon Entrance; back on land where it ran north along the disputed border with the United States; then up that to where it met the existing border.) The province brought along its dispute with the United States over the San Juan Islands, as well as its portion of the Alaska boundary dispute.	Disputes:
October 21, 1872	The dispute with the United States over the San Juan Islands was resolved in favour of the United States claim.	Disputes:
July 1, 1873	The British colony of Prince Edward Island joined Canada as the seventh province.	Map of the change to Canada on July 1, 1873
June 26, 1874	The borders of Ontario were provisionally expanded north and west. When the Province of Canada was formed, its borders were not entirely clear, and Ontario claimed to eventually reach all the way to the Rocky Mountains and Arctic Ocean. With Canada's acquisition of Rupert's Land, Ontario was interested in clearly defining its borders, especially since some of the new areas it was interested in were rapidly growing. After the federal government asked Ontario to pay for construction in the new disputed area, the province asked for an elaboration on its limits, and its boundary was moved north to 51° north, and west to a line running north from Hunter's Island.	Map of the change to Canada on June 26, 1874
October 7, 1876	The District of Keewatin was created from a central strip of the North-West Territories to provide government for the growing area north of Manitoba and west of Ontario; while the North-West Territories consisted of several districts, Keewatin had an elevated status and many sources note it distinct from the rest of the North-West Territories. (Note: The District of Keewatin was defined as the mainland area west of Ontario and Hudson Bay; east of Lake Manitoba, Lake Winnipegosis, and Cedar Lake, and a line north from Cedar Lake; and north of the United States.)	Map of the change to Canada on October 7, 1876
September 1, 1880	The United Kingdom transferred its Arctic Islands to Canada, where they were made part of the North-West Territories. The archipelago was still being explored and new islands discovered, but the United Kingdom and Canada had claimed the whole archipelago, so new discoveries are not noted unless disputed.	Map of the change to Canada on September 1, 1880
December 23, 1881	Manitoba was expanded, gaining land from the District of Keewatin and North-West Territories to the west, north, and east. (Note: Manitoba's new western and northern borders were defined only by township ranges and survey borders, with the southern border being the United States and the eastern border being Ontario.) Since the province's new eastern border was defined as the "western boundary of Ontario", the exact definition of which was still unclear, Ontario disputed a portion of the new region.	Map of the change to Canada on December 23, 1881
May 7, 1886	The southwestern border of the District of Keewatin was adjusted to conform to the boundaries of the provisional districts of the North-West Territories. (Note: The new border transferred land from the District of Keewatin west of the Nelson River and Lake Winnipeg, south of a line extending east from the northern border of the District of Saskatchewan, and north of Manitoba, to the North-West Territories.)	Map of the change to Canada on May 7, 1886
August 12, 1889	The dispute between Manitoba and Ontario ended as Ontario's borders were finalized, extending the province west to the Lake of the Woods and north to the Albany River.	Map of the change to Canada on August 12, 1889
October 2, 1895	The District of Keewatin was expanded to the portion of the North-West Territories north of Ontario.	Map of the change to Canada on October 2, 1895
December 18, 1897	Southampton Island, Coats Island, Akimiski Island, and other islands were transferred from the North-West Territories to the District of Keewatin, and Boothia Peninsula and Melville Peninsula were transferred from the District of Keewatin to the North-West Territories.	Map of the change to Canada on December 18, 1897
June 13, 1898	Yukon Territory was created from the District of Yukon in the northwestern part of the North-West Territories to supply a more local government to the explosive growth in population due to the Klondike Gold Rush. (Note: The borders of Yukon Territory were, from the Arctic Ocean: south along the international boundary to 60° north; east to the Liard River; north along the river to the height of the land; along that, approximately parallel to the Peel River, to 136° west; then north.) Quebec was enlarged north. (Note: The new northern border of Quebec was, starting from James Bay: up the Eastmain River to its source; east to the Hamilton River; then down that to the border with Newfoundland, which was still heavily disputed.)	Map of the change to Canada on June 13, 1898
May 23, 1901	The eastern border of Yukon Territory was slightly adjusted, thus exchanging some area with the North-West Territories, and also including some more islands.	Map of the change to Canada on May 23, 1901
October 20, 1903	The Alaska boundary dispute was resolved, generally in favour of the United States claim.	Disputes:
September 1, 1905	The provinces of Alberta (act) and Saskatchewan (act) were created from the North-West Territories. The provinces consisted of the area between British Columbia, Manitoba, the 60th parallel north, and the United States, with Alberta west of the 4th meridian of the Dominion Land Survey and Saskatchewan east of it. The status of the District of Keewatin was lowered back to the other districts of the North-West Territories.	Map of the change to Canada on September 1, 1905
1906	The North-West Territories were renamed the Northwest Territories.	Map of the change to Canada in 1906
September 26, 1907	The Newfoundland Colony became a dominion of the United Kingdom, inheriting the Labrador boundary dispute.	Disputes:
April 11, 1908	A boundary treaty redefined the maritime border with the United States. Among other changes, this "de-enclaved" Horseshoe Reef in Lake Erie by making the water around it contiguous with the water on the American side of the border.	no change to map
August 20, 1910	A boundary treaty with the United States addressed a slight uncertainty in the maritime border in Passamaquoddy Bay between New Brunswick and the United States. The border was adjusted to run east of Pope's Folly Island, which previously lay on the border line, and had been the subject of some debate for many years.	Map of the change to Canada on August 20, 1910
May 15, 1912	Manitoba, Ontario, and Quebec (act) were all expanded northward into land from the Northwest Territories. Quebec was expanded north to fill the mainland, Manitoba extended north to the 60th parallel north, and the new border between Manitoba and Ontario ran northeast from the previous northeastern corner of Manitoba.	Map of the change to Canada on May 15, 1912
June 1, 1925	The maritime boundaries of the Northwest Territories were extended to the North Pole.	no change to map
July 17, 1925	The border with the United States was adjusted in several places. The only change to a land border redefined how the border between the Lake of the Woods and the Rocky Mountains should be considered; previously, the border followed the curve of the parallel between each border monument, while the treaty changed this to straight lines between each monument. Through this, the United States netted a gain of between 30 and 35 acres (0.12–0.14 km^{2}) of land. There was also a change to the border in the Lake of the Woods; due to inaccurate surveying, the previous border intersected itself several times in the lake, creating enclaves of United States water surrounded by Canadian water. The treaty changed the border to use the southernmost intersection as the northwestern point of the Lake of the Woods. Finally, the maritime border in the Bay of Fundy was adjusted, netting Canada roughly 9 acres (0.036 km^{2}) of water.	too small to map
March 11, 1927	The Judicial Committee of the British Privy Council decided the Labrador boundary dispute with the Dominion of Newfoundland in favour of Newfoundland. (Note: The new Canada-Newfoundland border was, from Blanc-Sablon on the Gulf of St. Lawrence: north to 52° north; west to the height of the land; then following that around to include the watershed of the eastern coast of the Labrador Peninsula.) Quebec has occasionally indicated it does not recognize this border, but has not actively disputed the matter.	Disputes:
November 11, 1930	Norway ceded its long-dormant claim to the Sverdrup Islands to Canada, in exchange for British recognition of Norway's sovereignty over Jan Mayen.	Disputes:
December 11, 1931	The Statute of Westminster 1931 confirmed Canada's sovereignty from the United Kingdom on legislative and foreign issues.	no change to map
March 31, 1949	The Dominion of Newfoundland joined as the tenth province, Newfoundland.	Map of the change to Canada on March 31, 1949
March 13, 1974	The maritime border with Denmark was defined, notably "skipping" Hans Island which lies directly between Ellesmere Island and Greenland, and which was technically on neither side of the border.	no change to map
March 1, 1977	The United States claimed maritime borders west of the Strait of Juan de Fuca, within the Dixon Entrance, and in the Beaufort Sea that conflicted with claims of Canada.	no change to map
April 17, 1982	The Constitution Act, 1982, via the Canada Act 1982, made Canada completely independent of the United Kingdom, removing the requirement to involve the British parliament in amending the Canadian constitution.	no change to map
October 12, 1984	The International Court of Justice decided the maritime border with the United States in the Gulf of Maine. No land changed hands, and the scope of the case did not include the sovereignty of Machias Seal Island.	no change to map
April 1, 1999	The territory of Nunavut was created from roughly the eastern half of the Northwest Territories. (Note: The Northwest Territories-Nunavut border was complex and described in Schedule I of the Nunavut Act.)	Map of the change to Canada on April 1, 1999
December 6, 2001	The province of Newfoundland was renamed Newfoundland and Labrador.	Map of the change to Canada on December 6, 2001
April 1, 2003	Yukon Territory was renamed Yukon, though it remained a territory.	Map of the change to Canada on April 1, 2003
December 19, 2023	The border with Denmark was defined so that it passes through Hans Island rather than skipping over it. The agreement was announced on June 14, 2022, and the Danish parliament passed it on December 19, 2023.	Map of the change to Canada on December 19, 2023

== See also ==
- Former colonies and territories in Canada
- List of areas disputed by Canada and the United States
- List of Hudson's Bay Company trading posts
- List of French forts in North America
- List of proposed provinces and territories of Canada
- Territorial claims in the Arctic
- Territorial evolution of North America since 1763
