= District of Keewatin =

Territory in Canada from 1876 to 1905

- Territory of Canada
- 1876–1905
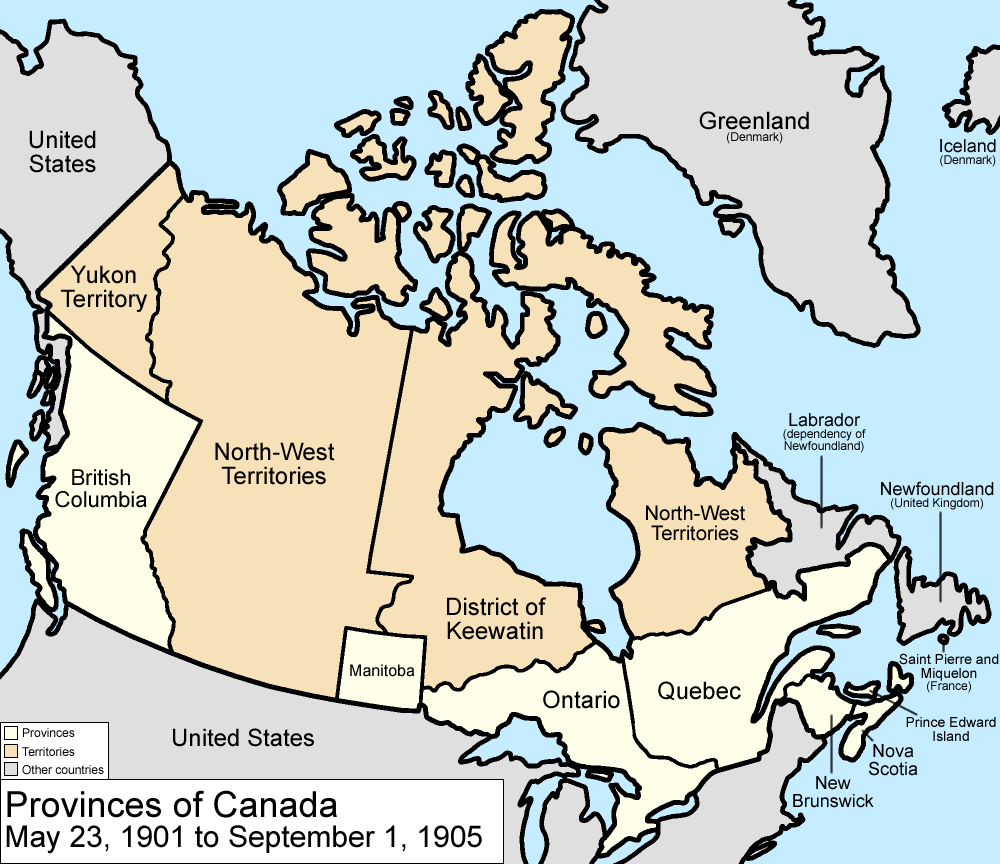
- Extent of the District of Keewatin before its reorganization in 1905.
- Legislature: Council of Keewatin
- History
  - Established: 1876
  - Disestablished: 1905
Succeeded by
Keewatin Region
- Today part of: Manitoba, Nunavut, Ontario

The District of Keewatin was a territory of Canada and later an administrative district of the Northwest Territories. It was created in 1876 by the Keewatin Act, and originally it covered a large area west of Hudson Bay. In 1905, it became a part of the Northwest Territories and in 1912, its southern parts were adjoined to the provinces of Manitoba and Ontario, leaving the remainder, now called the Keewatin Region, with a population of a few thousand people. On April 1, 1999, the Keewatin Region was formally dissolved, as Nunavut was created from eastern parts of the Northwest Territories, including all of Keewatin.

The name Keewatin comes from Algonquian roots—either kīwēhtin (ᑮᐍᐦᑎᐣ) in Cree or giiwedin (ᑮᐌᑎᓐ) in Ojibwe—both of which mean 'north wind' in their respective languages. In Inuktitut, it was called Kivalliq (ᑭᕙᓪᓕᖅ)—a name which persists as the Kivalliq Region in Nunavut.

== History ==
=== 1876–1905 ===
The District of Keewatin was created by the passage of the Keewatin Act on October 7, 1876, from a portion of Canada's Northwest Territories. The district ceased being an independent territory in 1905 and was returned to the Northwest Territories. At the time of its abolition, it covered 590,900 square kilometres (228,160 sq mi) — roughly the size of Saskatchewan. At its establishment in 1876, it encompassed the bulk of what is now Manitoba and northwestern Ontario and southern Nunavut. Its territory had been reduced over the years as areas were added to the two provinces.

The federal government created the District of Keewatin on the advice of Lieutenant Governor of Manitoba Alexander Morris. Morris convinced the government that the new territorial government of the Northwest Territories would be unable to effectively administer land to the north and east of Manitoba.

Morris was advised of the need for a new territory by James McKay. Morris approved of the idea and began conferring with McKay to determine a proper Indigenous name for the territory. McKay decided upon Keewatin, which comes from the Cree and Saulteaux languages and means 'the land of the north wind'. The government decided to use an Indigenous name to respect the cultural identity of Indigenous peoples, who formed the largest demographic.

==== Government ====
The District of Keewatin was run by an appointed council. The legislative branch of the government was a unicameral body, known as the Council of Keewatin. The council contained six members, all of whom were appointed by the lieutenant-governor. Political parties did not exist in the council.

The executive branch of the territory was run by the lieutenant-governor of Manitoba who also doubled as the lieutenant-governor of the District of Keewatin. The seat of government for the district was in Winnipeg, Manitoba.

The District of Keewatin did not have any representation in the House of Commons of Canada or the Senate of Canada.

==== Prohibition ====
Upon creation of the District of Keewatin, the Government of Canada decreed that intoxicants such as alcohol were forbidden to be imported into the territory. The government made this decision in regards to active law enforcement to curb the whisky trade running rampant in the Northwest Territories. Laws had been passed two years earlier by the Council of the Northwest Territories to enforce prohibition in that territory.

==== Police ====
The territorial laws created by the Council of Keewatin were enforced by the North-West Mounted Police.

The judicial system in the territory consisted of a combined court system of stipendiary magistrates who were appointed to the Council of the Northwest Territories and court proceedings taking place in the courts of Manitoba.

=== 1905–1999 ===
On September 1, 1905, the District of Keewatin became one of four districts in the Northwest Territories, the other three being the District of Ungava, the District of Mackenzie, and the District of Franklin. Keewatin covered the portion of the Northwest Territories north and east of Manitoba on the mainland (essentially much of present-day mainland Nunavut, northern Manitoba and northwestern Ontario), and western islands in Hudson and James Bays. After the boundaries of Ontario and Manitoba were extended northward in 1912, Keewatin largely consisted of treeless lands in the Arctic.

After 1920, the largely uninhabited eastern islands in Hudson Bay and James Bay that had been part of the District of Ungava were transferred to Keewatin.

Because of the harsh winters and lack of inland roads, settlement of the isolated district by non-indigenous people was poor, and even the Inuit population was sparse. In 1950, there were just 2,400 people in the entire district.

On April 1, 1999, the Keewatin Region was formally dissolved, as Nunavut was created from eastern parts of the Northwest Territories, including all of Keewatin. It had ceased to function as an administrative district of the Northwest Territories several years before it was divided.

== See also ==
- Keewatin (disambiguation)
