= Midland Regiment =

The Midland Regiment
- Active: 1936-1954
- Country: Canada
- Branch: Canadian Militia (1866-1940); Canadian Army (1940-1954)
- Type: Line infantry
- Role: Infantry
- Part of: Non-Permanent Active Militia (1867-1940); Royal Canadian Infantry Corps (1942-1954)
- Garrison/HQ: Cobourg, Ontario
- Motto(s): Excelsior (Latin for 'ever upward'); Semper paratus (Latin for 'always ready')
- March: "The Standard of St. George"
- Engagements: North-West Rebellion; Second Boer War; First World War; Second World War
- Battle honours: See #Battle honours

The Midland Regiment was an infantry regiment of the Non-Permanent Active Militia of the Canadian Militia and later the Canadian Army. The regiment was formed in 1936 by the Amalgamation of The Northumberland Regiment and The Durham Regiment. In 1954, The Midland Regiment was amalgamated into The Hastings and Prince Edward Regiment.

== Lineage ==
=== The Midland Regiment ===
- Originated on 5 October 1866, in Cobourg, Canada West, as the 40th Northumberland Battalion of Infantry
- Redesignated on 8 May 1900, as the 40th Northumberland Regiment
- Redesignated on 12 March 1920, as The Northumberland (Ontario) Regiment
- Redesignated on 15 May 1924, as The Northumberland Regiment
- Amalgamated on 15 December 1936, with The Durham Regiment and redesignated as The Midland Regiment (Northumberland and Durham)
- Redesignated on 7 November 1940, as the 2nd (Reserve) Battalion, The Midland Regiment (Northumberland and Durham)
- Redesignated on 1 June 1945, as The Midland Regiment (Northumberland and Durham)
- Redesignated on 1 April 1946, as The Midland Regiment
- Amalgamated on 1 September 1954, with 9th Anti-Tank Regiment (Self-Propelled) (Argyll Light Infantry), RCA, the 34th Anti-Tank Battery (Self Propelled), RCA, and The Hastings and Prince Edward Regiment

=== The Durham Regiment ===
- Originated on 16 November 1866, in Port Hope, Canada West, as the 46th East Durham Battalion of Infantry
- Redesignated on 1 August 1897, as the 46th Durham Battalion of Infantry
- Redesignated on 8 May 1900, as the 46th Durham Regiment
- Redesignated on 12 March 1920, as The Durham Regiment
- Amalgamated on 15 December 1936, with The Northumberland Regiment and redesignated as The Midland Regiment (Northumberland and Durham)

== Perpetuations ==
- 39th Battalion, CEF
- 136th (Durham) Battalion, CEF
- 139th (Northumberland) Battalion, CEF

== History ==
With the passing of the Militia Act of 1855, the first of a number of newly raised independent militia companies were established in and around the Northumberland County region of Canada West (now the Province of Ontario).

On 5 October 1866, the 40th Northumberland Battalion of Infantry was authorized for service by the regimentation of six of these previously authorized independent militia rifle and infantry companies. Its Regimental Headquarters was located at Cobourg and had companies at Cobourg, Campbellford, Brighton, Cold Springs, Grafton, Colborne, Castleton and Warkworth, Ontario.

=== 1936-1939 ===
As part of the Canadian Militia's reorganization of 1936, the Midland Regiment (Northumberland and Durham) was formed by the amalgamation of The Northumberland Regiment and The Durham Regiment.

=== Second World War ===
On 26 August 1939, details from The Midland Regiment were called out on service and then placed on active service on 1 September 1939, for local protection duties under the designation The Midland Regiment (Northumberland and Durham), CASF. On 31 December 1940, these details were disbanded.

On 24 May 1940, the regiment then mobilized The Midland Regiment (Northumberland and Durham), CASF, for active service and on 7 November 1940, the unit was again redesignated as the 1st Battalion, The Midland Regiment (Northumberland and Durham), CASF. The battalion served in Canada in a home defence role as part of the Prince Rupert Defences, 8th Canadian Infantry Division. On 10 January 1945, the battalion embarked for Great Britain. After its arrival in the UK, on 18 January 1945, the battalion was disbanded to provide reinforcements to the Canadian Army in the field.

=== Post war ===
On 1 April 1946, the regiment was redesignated as The Midland Regiment.

On 1 September 1954, as a result of the Kennedy Report on the Reserve Army, The Midland Regiment was amalgamated along with the 9th Anti-Tank Regiment (Self-Propelled) (Argyll Light Infantry), RCA into The Hastings and Prince Edward Regiment.

== Organization ==
The Midland Regiment (Northumberland and Durham) (15 December 1936)

- Regimental HQ (Cobourg)
- A Company (Cobourg)
- B Company (Campbellford)
- C Company (Millbrook)
- D Company (Orono)

== Alliances ==
- United Kingdom - The Royal Northumberland Fusiliers (1936–1954)
- United Kingdom - The Durham Light Infantry (Until 1954)

== Battle honours ==
=== North-West Rebellion ===
- North West Canada, 1885

=== Great War ===
- Mount Sorrel
- Somme, 1916
- Arras, 1917, ’18
- Hill 70
- Ypres, 1917
- Amiens
- Hindenburg Line
- Pursuit to Mons
- The Great War, 1915-17

== Notable members ==
- Honorary Colonel Vincent Massey
