= Argyll Light Infantry =

The Argyll Light Infantry
- Active: 1863–1954
- Country: Province of Canada (1863–1867); Canada (1867–1954)
- Branch: Canadian Militia (1863–1940); Canadian Army (1940–1954)
- Type: Light infantry
- Role: Infantry (1863–1936); Armoured (1936–46); Artillery (1946–1954)
- Size: One regiment
- Part of: Non-Permanent Active Militia (1871–1940); Royal Canadian Armoured Corps (1940–1946); Royal Regiment of Canadian Artillery (1946–1954)
- Garrison/HQ: Belleville, Ontario
- Motto(s): Latin: nulli secundus, lit. 'second to none'
- March: Quick: "The Campbells are Coming”
- Engagements: Fenian Raids; North-West Rebellion; Second Boer War; First World War
- Battle honours: See #Battle honours

The Argyll Light Infantry was an infantry regiment of the Non-Permanent Active Militia of the Canadian Militia (now the Canadian Army). In 1936, the regiment was converted from infantry to form one of the Canadian Army's first tank units, and then in 1946 was converted to anti-tank artillery. In 1954, the regiment was converted back to infantry and amalgamated along with The Midland Regiment into The Hastings and Prince Edward Regiment.

== Lineage ==
- Originated on 16 January 1863, in Belleville, Ontario, as the 15th Battalion Volunteer Militia (Infantry) Canada.
- Redesignated on 2 June 1871, as the 15th Battalion or the Argyll Light Infantry.
- Redesignated on 8 May 1900, as the 15th Regiment Argyll Light Infantry.
- Redesignated on 12 March 1920, The Argyll Light Infantry.
- Redesignated on 15 December 1936, as The Argyll Light Infantry (Tank).
- Redesignated on 7 November 1940, as The (Reserve) Argyll Light Infantry (Tank).
- Converted to artillery and amalgamated on 1 April 1946, with the 44th (Reserve) Field Regiment, RCA, and redesignated as the 9th Anti-Tank Regiment (Self-Propelled) (Argyll Light Infantry), RCA.
- Converted to infantry and amalgamated on 1 September 1954, with the 34th Anti-Tank Battery (Self Propelled), RCA, The Hastings and Prince Edward Regiment and The Midland Regiment, and redesignated as The Hastings and Prince Edward Regiment.

== Perpetuations ==
- 155th (Quinte) Battalion, CEF

== History ==
=== Early history ===
On 16 January 1863, the 15th Battalion Volunteer Militia (Infantry) Canada was authorized. It had its regimental headquarters and companies in Belleville, Ontario.

=== Fenian Raids ===
On 8 March 1866, the 15th Battalion Volunteer Militia (Infantry) Canada was called out on active service. On 27 March 1866, the battalion was stood down from active service.

=== North West Rebellion ===
On 10 April 1885, the 15th Battalion Argyll Light Infantry mobilized a company for active service with The Midland Battalion where it served in the Alberta Column of the North West Field Force. On 24 July 1885, the company was removed from active service.

=== South African War and early 1900s ===
During the Boer War, the 15th Argyll Light Infantry contributed volunteers for the Canadian contingents, most notably for the 2nd (Special Service) Battalion, Royal Canadian Regiment.

On 8 May 1900, the 15th Battalion Argyll Light Infantry was redesignated as the 15th Regiment Argyll Light Infantry.

=== Great War ===
While the 15th Regiment Argyll Light Infantry did not mobilize for the First World War, they contributed volunteers for various units of the Canadian Expeditionary Force, including the 2nd Battalion (Eastern Ontario Regiment), CEF; the 21st Battalion (Eastern Ontario), CEF; the 39th Battalion, CEF; the 77th Battalion (Ottawa), CEF; the 80th Battalion, CEF; the 136th (Durham) Battalion, CEF; the 155th (Quinte) Battalion, CEF, and the 245th Battalion (Canadian Grenadier Guards), CEF.

On 22 December 1915, the 155th Battalion, CEF, was authorized and on 17 October 1916, embarked for Great Britain. After its arrival in the UK, the battalion provided reinforcements in the field to the Canadian Corps until 8 December 1916, when its personnel were absorbed by the 154th "Overseas" Battalion, CEF. On 17 July 1917, the 155th Battalion was disbanded.

=== 1920s–1930s ===
As a result of the Otter Commission, the 15th Regiment Argyll Light Infantry was redesignated as The Argyll Light Infantry and was reorganized with two battalions (one of them a paper-only reserve battalion) to perpetuate the assigned war-raised battalions of the Canadian Expeditionary Force.

As a result of the 1936 Canadian Militia reorganization, The Argyll Light Infantry was one of a number of infantry regiments to become tank units. These were known as infantry (tank) battalions. As a result of this, the regiment was redesignated as The Argyll Light Infantry (Tank).

=== Second World War ===
With the formation of the Canadian Armoured Corps (later the Royal Canadian Armoured Corps), The Argyll Light Infantry (Tank) was transferred from the infantry to the RCAC.

=== Post war and amalgamation ===
==== 9th Anti-Tank Regiment (Self-Propelled) (Argyll Light Infantry), RCA ====
On 1 April 1946, The Argyll Light Infantry were converted to artillery and amalgamated with 44th (Reserve) Field Regiment, RCA. They were subsequently redesignated as 9th Anti-Tank Regiment (Self-Propelled) (Argyll Light Infantry), RCA.

On 1 September 1954, as a result of the Kennedy Report on the Reserve Army, The Argyll Light Infantry were converted back to infantry and amalgamated into The Hastings and Prince Edward Regiment along with the 34th Anti-Tank Battery (Self Propelled), RCA and The Midland Regiment.

== Organization ==
=== 15th Belleville Battalion Volunteer Militia (16 January 1863) ===
- Regimental Headquarters (Belleville, Ontario)
- No. 1 Company
- No. 2 Company
- No. 3 Company
- No. 4 Company
- No. 5 Company
- No. 6 Company

=== The Argyll Light Infantry (20 March 1920) ===
- 1st Battalion (perpetuating the 155th Battalion, CEF)
- 2nd (Reserve) Battalion

=== The Argyll Light Infantry (Tank) (15 December 1936) ===
- Regimental Headquarters (Belleville, Ontario)
- A Company
- B Company
- C Company
- D Company

== Battle honours ==
- Arras, 1917, '18
- Hill 70
- Ypres, 1917
- Amiens

== Notable members ==
- Sir Mackenzie Bowell PC KCMG: Fifth Prime Minister of Canada (1894–1896)
- Major-General James Lyons Biggar, CMG
- Assistant Commissioner Leif Newry Fitzroy Crozier

== See also ==
- Canadian-Scottish regiment
