= Bell of Frog Lake =

Church bell

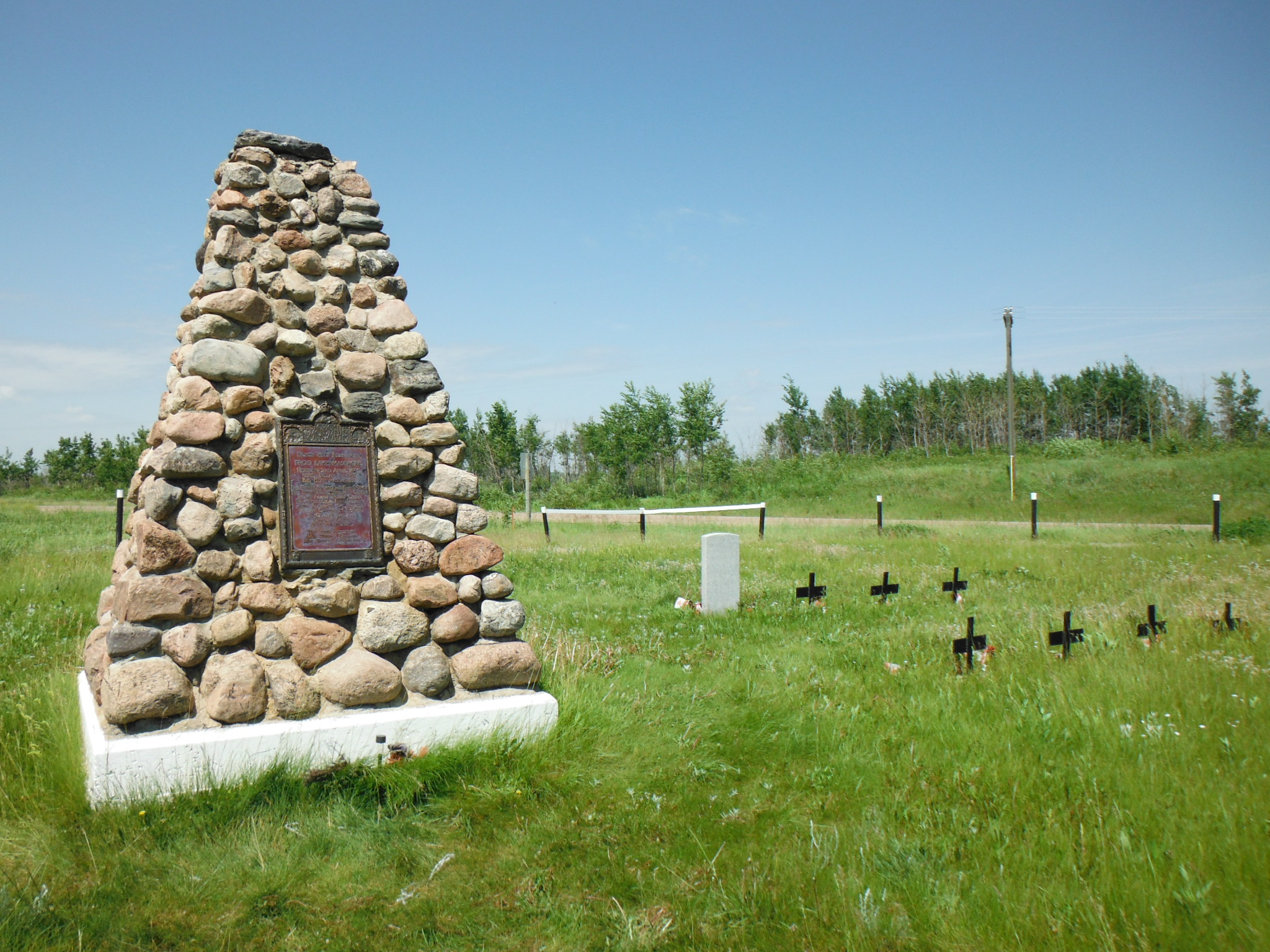
Location of the Frog Lake Massacre (about 2.8 km east of Frog Lake, Alberta)

The Bell of Frog Lake is a church bell that once hung on a timber frame next to the church dedicated to Our Lady of Good Counsel (Notre Dame du Bon Conseil) in the settlement of Frog Lake. The settlement was the site of the Frog Lake Massacre, part of the Cree uprising of the North-West Rebellion in western Canada. Led by Wandering Spirit, young Cree warriors attacked the village of Frog Lake in the District of Saskatchewan of the North-West Territories on 2 April 1885, where they killed nine residents.

The bell was one of twenty identical bells purchased by Bishop Vital-Justin Grandin for the Diocese of St Albert. For a time the bell was believed to have been taken from the church of Batoche after the Battle of Batoche.

== History ==
After the massacre, the bodies of Fafard, Marchand, Delaney and Gowanlock had been hurriedly placed in the cellar under the church by several of the Métis residents who were now captive. They, at great risk, also moved the bodies of Quinn and Gouin into the cellar of a house near where they were killed but were refused permission to touch the other victims. The church, the rectory and all the buildings of the Frog Lake settlement were burned on April 4 (the day before Easter). All that remained of the mission was the bell tower and the cemetery.

On June 14 the Midland Provisional Battalion (the advance guard of Major-General Thomas Bland Strange) arrived and buried the bodies in the cemetery. The bell, which was still suspended from the fire blackened bell tower by the church, on June 8 disappeared. Bishop Grandin suspected that the soldiers had taken the bell, but a search found no trace. Laurent Legoff (an Oblate priest in charge of the St. Raphael Mission at Cold Lake) also mentions that the bell of the Frog Lake Mission had been taken from the bell tower. General Strange upon learning of the theft blamed the military teamsters. Several years later the Canadian government reimbursed the mission for their lost bell.

In 2014 evidence that soldiers from the Midland Battalion had indeed stolen the bell surfaced in Ontario. The Midland Battalion served in the Alberta Column of the North West Field Force until it was demobilized on 24 July 1885.

Charles H. Winslow who was a captain in the Midland Battalion and received the North West Canada Medal for service against the North West Rebellion wrote of the bell:

"All was desolation. The only thing left was a stockade fence around where the Roman Catholic church had stood, and, at the gate, two posts, on which was swinging a small bell, and as there was quite a crave for souvenirs, some of men of my company, without my knowledge, or any of the officers' knowledge, took it down in this night, packed it in a box with some old clothing and managed to smuggle it home."

William Young, a private of the Millbrook Company in the Midland Battalion, who received the North West Canada Medal for service against the North West Rebellion, also mentioned the bell in his diary on Friday, July 25, 1885:

"Our company then presented the town with a large bell that we had brought from Frog Lake, to be used as a fire bell. The bell had belonged to the Roman Catholic Mission at Frog Lake and one dark night two of our lads went and seized the bell and nailing it up in a wooden box had brought it home to Millbrook. The authorities had searched for the bell but could find no trace of it." Will E. Young

== Authentication ==
The bell was kept in Millbrook, Ontario, until 1991, when it was stolen from the Royal Canadian Legion hall. It resurfaced in 2013 in Métis hands. The Métis believed it to be the Bell of Batoche. The Frog Lake bell had been misidentified as being from Batoche in a Canadian Centennial yearbook published by a local historical society.

Questions about its authenticity as the Bell of Batoche ensued until April 2014 when Le Musée de Saint-Boniface Museum director, Philippe Mailhot, acknowledged that there was enough evidence to conclude that the "Bell of Batoche" which is in the possession of the museum was actually the "Bell of Frog Lake" taken from the Frog Lake Mission in 1885.

Evidence that corroborated the bell's Frog Lake origin was discovered by the CBC in 2014. A series of handwritten certificates and notes indicated that the original Batoche bell was donated in 1937 to another Catholic mission in St. Laurent de Grandin, about 12 kilometres (7.5 mi) from Batoche. That church burned down in 1990, destroying the bell except its clapper and a few pieces of copper. The church was rebuilt, and the bell's fragments are kept in the new church's shrine in a locked glass case.

== See also ==
- Bell of Batoche
