= Durham Regiment =

The Durham Regiment
- Active: 1866-1936
- Country: Province of Canada 1866–1867; Canada 1867–1936
- Branch: Canadian Militia
- Type: Line infantry
- Role: Infantry
- Part of: Non-Permanent Active Militia
- Garrison/HQ: Port Hope, Ontario
- Motto(s): Semper paratus (Latin for 'always ready')
- Engagements: North-West Rebellion; Second Boer War; First World War
- Battle honours: See #Battle honours

The Durham Regiment was an infantry regiment of the Non-Permanent Active Militia of the Canadian Militia (now the Canadian Army). In 1936, the regiment was amalgamated with the Northumberland Regiment to form the Midland Regiment (which now forms part of the Hastings and Prince Edward Regiment).

== Lineage ==
=== The Durham Regiment ===
- Originated on 16 November 1866 in Port Hope, Canada West, as the 46th East Durham Battalion of Infantry
- Redesignated on 1 August 1897 as the 46th Durham Battalion of Infantry
- Redesignated on 8 May 1900 as the 46th Durham Regiment
- Redesignated on 12 March 1920 as The Durham Regiment
- Amalgamated on 15 December 1936 with The Northumberland Regiment and redesignated as The Midland Regiment (Northumberland and Durham)

== Perpetuations ==
- 136th (Durham) Battalion, CEF

== History ==
=== Early history ===
With the passing of the Militia Act of 1855, the first of a number of newly raised independent militia companies were established in and around the Durham County region of Canada West (now the Province of Ontario).

On 16 November 1866, the 46th East Durham Battalion of Infantry was authorized for service by the regimentation of five of these previously authorized independent militia rifle, infantry and artillery companies. Its regimental headquarters was located at Port Hope and had companies at Port Hope, Millbrook, Springville, Lifford and Janetville, Ontario.

=== North West Rebellion ===
On 10 April 1885, the 46th East Durham Battalion of Infantry mobilized two companies for active service with the Midland Provisional Battalion, which served in the Alberta Column of the North West Field Force. On 24 July 1885, the battalion was removed from active service.

=== South African War and early 1900s ===
During the South African War, the 46th Durham Battalion contributed volunteers for the Canadian contingents serving overseas. One member, Captain William Peter Keith Milligan, who had resigned his officer's commission to serve overseas, was killed in action while serving with the 2nd Canadian Mounted Rifles.

On 8 May 1900, the 46th Durham Battalion of Infantry was redesignated as the 46th Durham Regiment.

=== Great War ===
On 22 December 1915, the 136th (Durham) Battalion, CEF was authorized for service, and on 25 September 1916, the battalion embarked for Great Britain. After its arrival in the UK, on 6 October 1916, the battalion's personnel were absorbed by the 39th Reserve Battalion to provide reinforcements to the Canadian Corps in the field. On 22 May 1917, the 136th Battalion was disbanded.

=== 1920s–1930s ===
On 15 March 1920, as a result of the Otter Commission and the following post-war reorganization of the militia, the 46th Durham Regiment was redesignated as The Durham Regiment and was reorganized with two battalions (one of them a paper-only reserve battalion) to perpetuate the assigned war-raised battalions of the Canadian Expeditionary Force.

As a result of the 1936 Canadian Militia reorganization, on 15 December 1936, The Durham Regiment was amalgamated with The Northumberland Regiment to form The Midland Regiment (Northumberland and Durham).

== Organization ==
=== 46th East Durham Battalion of Infantry (16 November 1866) ===
- No. 1 Company (Port Hope) (first raised on 8 June 1866 as the Port Hope Battery Garrison Artillery)
- No. 2 Company (Port Hope) (first raised on 22 January 1862 as the Port Hope Volunteer Militia Rifle Company)
- No. 3 Company (Port Hope) (first raised on 17 October 1862 as the Port Hope Volunteer Militia Company of Infantry)
- No. 4 Company (Millbrook) (first raised on 16 January 1863 as the Millbrook Volunteer Militia Company of Infantry)
- No. 5 Company (Springville) (first raised on 17 August 1866 as the Springville Infantry Company)
- No. 6 Company (Lifford)

=== The Durham Regiment (February 15, 1921) ===
- 1st Battalion (perpetuating the 136th Battalion, CEF)
- 2nd (Reserve) Battalion

== Battle honours ==
=== North-West Rebellion ===
- North West Canada, 1885

=== Great War ===
- Arras, 1917

== Notable members ==
- Lieutenant-Colonel The Honourable Arthur Trefusis Heneage Williams
- Lieutenant-Colonel Henry Alfred Ward
- Lieutenant-Colonel Charles Arkoll Boulton
