= Wallace Lloyd Algie =

Canadian military officer (1891–1918)

Lieutenant Wallace Lloyd Algie VC
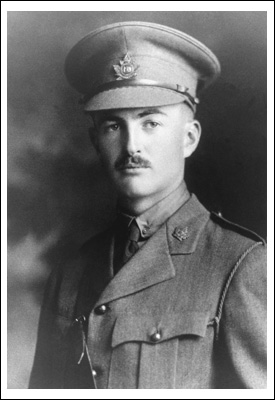
- Wallace Lloyd Algie in uniform
- Born: 10 June 1891; Alton, Ontario, Canada
- Died: 11 October 1918 (aged 27); Iwuy, France
- Burial place: Niagara Cemetery, Iwuy
- Education: Royal Military College of Canada
- Military career
- Allegiance: Dominion of Canada
- Branch: Canadian Militia: Canadian Expeditionary Force
- Service years: 1916–1918
- Rank: Lieutenant
- Units: Queen's Own Rifles of Canada; 40th Northumberland Regiment; 2nd Canadian Division: 4th Canadian Infantry Brigade; 20th (Central Ontario) Battalion
- Conflicts: First World War: Western Front; Battle of Hill 70; Hundred Days Offensive; Battle of Cambrai †
- Awards: Victoria Cross

Lieutenant Wallace Lloyd Algie, VC (10 June 1891 – 11 October 1918) was a Canadian Expeditionary Force (CEF) officer and a recipient of the Victoria Cross (VC), the highest award for gallantry in the face of the enemy that can be awarded to British and Commonwealth forces. A soldier with the CEF during the First World War, he was posthumously awarded the VC for his actions on 11 October 1918, during the Hundred Days Offensive, exactly a month before the armistice with Germany.

== Early life ==
Wallace Lloyd Algie was born on 10 June 1891 at 1155 King Street at Alton in Ontario, Canada, the son of James and Rachel Algie. His father was a medical doctor whose practice covered Peel County, near Toronto, and had practiced medicine for over twenty-five years. The family later moved to Toronto itself sometime in 1908, settling in at 75 Dewson Street. Algie was educated at Alton Public School and when his schooling was completed, he worked in banking before entering the Royal Military College of Canada. After graduating from there as a lieutenant, he served initially in the Queen's Own Rifles of Canada and then the 40th Northumberland Regiment. He was known to play the euphonium in the regimental band which was quite common at that time for officers and men of musical inclination.

== First World War ==
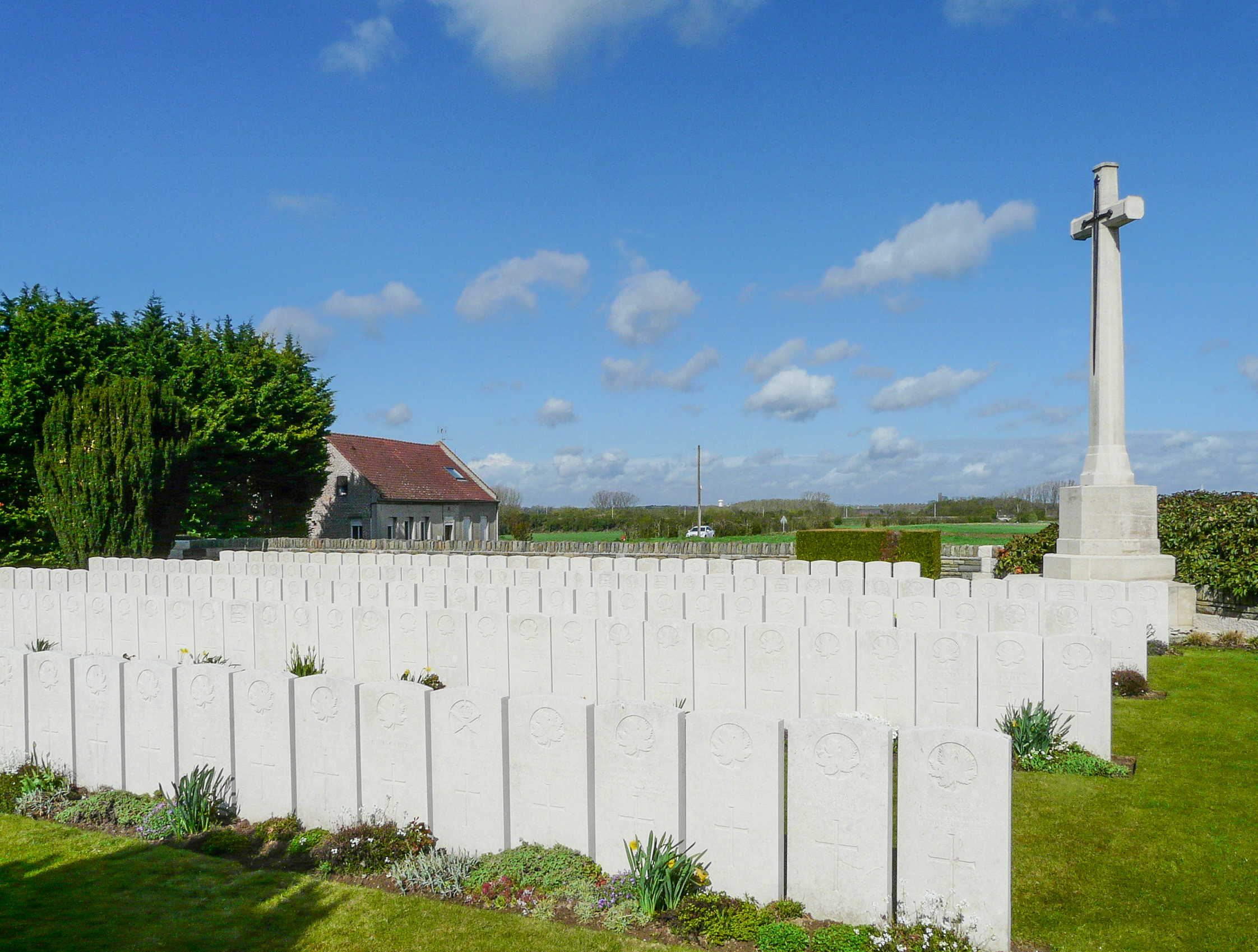
Niagara Cemetery at Iwuy, where Algie is buried.

In April 1916, almost two years after the First World War began, Algie enlisted in the Canadian Expeditionary Force (CEF), following in the footsteps of one of his brother's who had already volunteered to serve in the war. Initially posted to the 95th Battalion, he was later transferred to the 20th Battalion, which arrived in France the following year to join the 4th Canadian Infantry Brigade, part of the 2nd Canadian Division, on the Western Front. He took part in the Battle of Hill 70 and in the subsequent operations around Lens.

On 11 October 1918, during the Hundred Days Offensive, and as the war was coming to its end, the 4th Brigade was supporting the 6th Canadian Brigade in an attack on the German-held village of Iwuy, north east of Cambrai in France. Aware that German soldiers were bringing up more machine-guns, Algie led a group of volunteers past his battalion's designated area of operations and captured two machine-guns, which were brought to bear on the Germans. In doing so he secured the east end of Iwuy and returned to his lines for reinforcements. He was killed when leading them back to the area under the control of his men. His actions on 11 October contributed to the capture of the entire village later that day, for which he was posthumously awarded the Victoria Cross (VC). The VC, instituted in 1856, was the highest award for valour that could be bestowed on a soldier of the British Empire. The citation that was published in the London Gazette for his VC read:

For most conspicuous bravery and self-sacrifice on the 11th October, 1918, north-east of Cambrai, when with attacking troops which came under heavy enfilade machine-gun fire from a neighbouring village. Rushing forward with nine volunteers, he shot the crew of an enemy machine gun, and, turning it on the enemy, enabled his party to reach the village. He then rushed another machine gun, killed the crew, captured an officer and 10 enemy, and thereby cleared the end of the village. Lt. Algie, having established his party, went back for reinforcements, but was killed when leading them forward. His valour and personal initiative in the face of intense fire saved many lives and enabled the position to be held.

— The London Gazette, 28 January 1919

Algie's body was retrieved and he was buried at the Commonwealth War Graves Commission's Niagara Cemetery at Iwuy, 5 mi (8.0 km) north east of Cambrai.

== Victoria Cross ==
On 28 March 1919, Algie's father was presented with his son's posthumous VC by the Lieutenant Governor of Toronto. The VC was later sold at auction to Lord Ashcroft in 1995 for £17,800, and is on display in the Lord Ashcroft Gallery at the Imperial War Museum. The exact whereabouts of the other medals that Algie was entitled to, the British War Medal and the Victory Medal, are not known but they are most likely in the possession of a collector.
