= Bell of Batoche =

20-pound silver-plated church bell

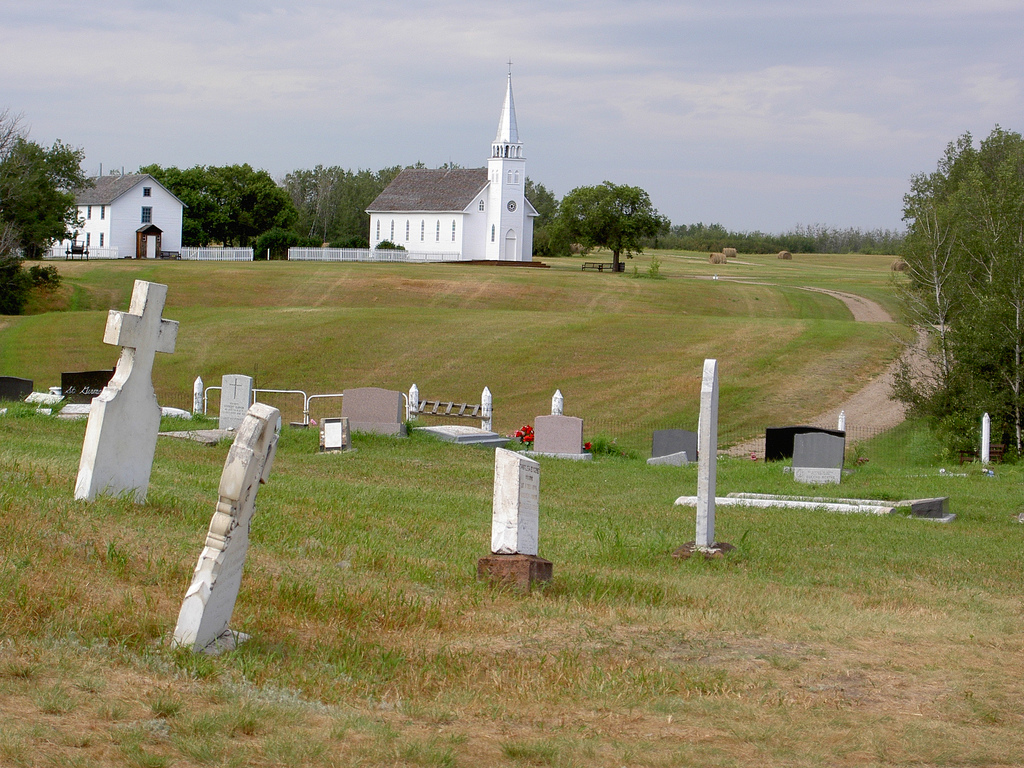
The church and rectory of Saint Antoine de Padoue in Batoche, Saskatchewan, Canada (built 1883–1884)

The Bell of Batoche is a 20-pound (9.1 kg) silver-plated church bell in Canada believed to have been seized in 1885 as spoils of war from the Métis community of Batoche (now in Saskatchewan) by soldiers from Ontario, following their victory in the Battle of Batoche over the North-West Rebellion. The bell was kept in Millbrook, Ontario, until 1991, when it was stolen from the Royal Canadian Legion hall. It resurfaced in 2013 in Métis hands. However, evidence suggesting the bell's actual origin was Frog Lake emerged soon after.

Questions about its authenticity as the Bell of Batoche ensued until April 2014 when Le Musée de Saint-Boniface Museum director acknowledged that there was enough evidence to conclude that the "Bell of Batoche" in the museum was actually the Bell of Frog Lake taken from the Frog Lake Mission in 1885.

== Installation in Batoche ==
The bell was one of twenty identical bells purchased by Bishop Vital-Justin Grandin for the Diocese of St Albert. A bell was purchased in 1884 for the Catholic parish church of Saint Antoine de Padoue in Batoche at the request of Father Julien Moulin. As was customary, the bell was "baptized" by Bishop Vital-Justin Grandin on September 2, 1884, with the name "Marie-Antoinette", and was given the inscription "Vital-Justin Grandin, évêque de S^{t.} Albert" ("Vital-Justin Grandin, Bishop of St. Albert"). A steeple was added to the church after 1885.

== Seizure ==
During the North-West Rebellion, the community of Batoche served as the ad hoc capital of the Louis Riel's Provisional Government of Saskatchewan. Following a succession of losses to the Métis and their aboriginal allies at Duck Lake, Fort Pitt, Fish Creek, and Cut Knife, the Canadian Militia under British officer Frederick Middleton finally defeated the Métis resistance at Batoche on May 12, 1885. Louis Riel later turned himself in to the North West Field Force on May 15, 1885.

The bell of Batoche was supposedly taken as a war trophy by two soldiers and sent back to Ontario. Beginning in 1930, the bell hung for several decades in the fire hall of Millbrook, Ontario, the home of several of the soldiers who had taken it. The building was destroyed by fire, and the bell was cracked in the blaze. By 1991, it was kept in the hall of Millbrook branch of the Royal Canadian Legion.

== Political controversy ==
The Métis of Saskatchewan had attempted a number of times since 1885 to recover the bell. In 1990, they sent another request for its return.

A CBC report covering the reaction of the Millbrook legion members quoted one member as saying, "We got it. You tried to wreck the country and we stopped you... and we've got the bell. It's ours."

In October 1991, Yvon Dumont, president of the Manitoba Métis Federation, visited the Legion hall where the bell was kept, accompanied by several other Manitoba Métis. They were photographed standing in front of the bell.

== Theft ==
A week later, the bell kept in the Millbrook Legion was stolen in the night. Taken along with the bell were several medals belonging to Sergeant Ed McCorry, a soldier from Millbrook who had been present at the Battle of Batoche. A group of Métis men was responsible for the theft, describing it as a "gentleman's dare".

The whereabouts of the bell from that time forward are not publicly known. Yvon Dumont disclaimed any knowledge of the identity of the burglars, though he later said that "if it's a Métis person that has it, I would consider that person a hero, not a criminal."

Negotiations were begun to secure the official transfer of ownership of the bell to the Métis Nation, and Dumont offered to pay for the damage caused by the break-in. However, the Ontario legion hall initially refused to negotiate until the McCorry medals were returned.

In 2000, Saskatchewan Aboriginal Affairs Minister Jack Hillson issued a statement promising no charges would be laid if the bell was returned. It was hoped this would lead to the bell's return in time for Saskatchewan's millennium celebrations, but it did not appear.

In August 2005, Gabriel Dufault, leader of the Union nationale métisse Saint-Joseph du Manitoba, stated, "I've heard it's in Winnipeg. I've heard it's in a garage in the North End... I have a pretty good idea who the people that know more ... are."

In a Globe and Mail story from October 8, 2005, Gary Floyd Guiboche, a Manitoba Métis who visited the bell with Dumont in 1991, confessed to stealing the bell. He refused to identify his partner in the theft, who he said "has kept the bell hidden too long for no reason." He said his partner had taken the McCorry medals, in addition to the bell, as "payback".

== Reappearance ==
On June 20, 2013, it was announced that the bell would be given to the bishop of the diocese of Prince Albert, Saskatchewan, on July 20, 2013. Photos of the bell were also released, including one of its crack being repaired. The bell was publicly displayed on July 20, during the Back to Batoche Days festival. Billyjo Delaronde, one of the Métis men who took the bell from Millbrook in 1991, was present during the unveiling and described his involvement. The bell is now held by the Union nationale métisse Saint-Joseph du Manitoba, a Métis organization founded in 1887. The bell was not reinstalled in the Batoche church steeple, but is displayed at Le Musée de Saint-Boniface Museum in Winnipeg.

== Questioned authenticity ==
An Ontario playwright raised doubts that the bell kept in Millbrook ever was the bell from Batoche. Robert Winslow, whose ancestor was the captain of the Millbrook soldiers, claims to have evidence that the bell had actually been taken from a church in Frog Lake following the Frog Lake Massacre.

Evidence that appears to corroborate the bell's Frog Lake origin was discovered by the Canadian Broadcasting Corporation in 2014. The Frog Lake bell was misidentified as being from Batoche in a centennial yearbook published by a local historical society in 1967. A series of handwritten certificates and notes indicate that the original Batoche bell was donated in 1937 to another Catholic mission in St. Laurent de Grandin, about 12 kilometres (7.5 mi) from Batoche. That church burned down in 1990, destroying the bell except its clapper and a few pieces of copper. The church was rebuilt, and the bell's fragments are kept in the new church's shrine in a locked glass case.

The director of Le Musée de Saint-Boniface Museum was convinced that the bell in their possession is from Frog Lake. He believes its fate is something that will have to be determined by the Frog Lake area's Roman Catholic diocese.
