= Hastings and Prince Edward Regiment =

Military unit of Canada

The Hastings and Prince Edward Regiment
- Cap badge of the regiment
- Active: 16 January 1863 – present
- Country: Province of Canada (1863–1867); Canada (1867–present)
- Branch: Canadian Army
- Type: Line infantry
- Role: Light Infantry
- Size: Battalion
- Part of: 33 Canadian Brigade Group
- Garrison/HQ: Belleville, Peterborough, Cobourg
- Nicknames: Ploughjockeys; Hasty P's
- Motto: Paratus (Latin for 'prepared')
- March: Quick: "I'm 95"
- Mascot: Chief Petawawa-Much
- Anniversaries: Pachino Day, 10 July 1943
- Engagements: Fenian Raids; North-West Rebellion; Second Boer War; First World War; Second World War; War in Afghanistan
- Battle honours: See #Battle honours

Commanders
- Current commander: LCol Angelo Manzara
- Colonel-in-Chief: Prince Edward, Duke of Edinburgh
- Notable commanders: LCol The Lord Tweedsmuir; LCol Angus Duffy; General J Dextraze

The Hastings and Prince Edward Regiment is a Primary Reserve infantry regiment of the Canadian Army. The regiment is part of 33 Canadian Brigade Group, one of 10 brigade groups of the 2nd Canadian Division. The regimental headquarters and one company (A Company, Assoro Company) are at 187 Pinnacle Street in Belleville and on Willmott Street in Cobourg, with another rifle company in Peterborough. The Peterborough Armoury houses what was traditionally B Company or Moro Company. Moro Company also serves as the headquarters for the regiment’s Assault Pioneer Platoon. Normally, the regiment deploys as a composite, Ortona Company, while the headquarters and administration form Somme Company.

In 2017, the Canadian Army assigned the Hastings and Prince Edward Regiment the mission task to raise, train, and maintain the assault pioneer combat support capability within the 4th Canadian Division. Since taking on the task, the regiment has trained more assault pioneers than any other unit outside of the Canadian Army’s Combat Training Centre. Hasty P assault pioneers have deployed on training exercises with the 3rd Battalion Royal Canadian Regiment and overseas on Operation Unifier.

The commanding officer is Lieutenant-Colonel Angelo Manzara, who took over from Lieutenant-Colonel Marc Gallant on 11 May 2023. Commanding officers normally hold the position for a term of three years. The regimental sergeant major is Chief Warrant Officer Roderick McNeil. The colonel-in-chief is Prince Edward, Duke of Edinburgh, who visited the regiment in June 2005 and received a guard of honour from the regiment during his visit to Old Fort Henry in Kingston in June 2008.

== Lineage ==
Regimental colour

Camp flag

=== 9th Anti-Tank Regiment (Self-Propelled) (Argyll Light Infantry), RCA ===
- Originated 16 January 1863 in Belleville, Ontario as the 15th Battalion Volunteer Militia (Infantry) Canada
- Redesignated 2 June 1871 as the 15th Battalion or the Argyll Light Infantry
- Redesignated 8 May 1900 as the 15th Regiment Argyll Light Infantry
- Redesignated 12 March 1920 The Argyll Light Infantry
- Redesignated 15 December 1936 as The Argyll Light Infantry (Tank)
- Redesignated 7 November 1940 as The (Reserve) Argyll Light Infantry (Tank)
- Amalgamated 1 April 1946 with the 44th (Reserve) Field Regiment, RCA, converted to artillery, and redesignated as the 9th Anti-Tank Regiment (Self-Propelled) (Argyll Light Infantry), RCA
- Amalgamated 1 September 1954 with the 34th Anti-Tank Battery (Self Propelled), RCA, The Hastings and Prince Edward Regiment and The Midland Regiment, converted to infantry, and redesignated as The Hastings and Prince Edward Regiment.

=== 16th Battalion Volunteer Militia (Infantry) Canada ===
- Originated 6 February 1863 in Picton, Ontario as the 16th Battalion Volunteer Militia (Infantry) Canada
- Redesignated 30 November 1866 as the 16th Prince Edward Battalion of Infantry
- Redesignated 8 May 1900 as the 16th Prince Edward Regiment
- Amalgamated 12 March 1920 with the 49th Regiment Hastings Rifles to form The Hastings and Prince Edward Regiment
- Redesignated 7 November 1940 as the 2nd (Reserve) Battalion, The Hastings and Prince Edward Regiment
- Redesignated 1 November 1945 as The Hastings and Prince Edward Regiment
- Amalgamated 1 September 1954 with the 9th Anti-Tank Regiment (Self Propelled), RCA, the 34th Anti- Tank Battery (Self Propelled), RCA, and The Midland Regiment, retaining its designation

=== 44th (Reserve) Field Regiment, RCA ===
- Originated 1 June 1905 in Gananoque, Ontario, as the 9th Brigade, Canadian Field Artillery
- Redesignated 1 July 1925 as the 9th Field Brigade, Canadian Artillery
- Redesignated 3 June 1935 as the 9th Field Brigade, RCA
- Redesignated 7 November 1940 as the 9th (Reserve) Field Brigade, RCA
- Redesignated 24 June 1942 as the 44th (Reserve) Field Regiment, RCA
- Amalgamated 1 April 1946 with The (Reserve) Argyll Light Infantry (Tank)

=== 34th Anti-Tank Battery (Self-Propelled), RCA ===
- Originated 1 April 1912 in Belleville, Ontario, as the 34th Battery, CFA
- Redesignated 1 July 1925 as the 34th Field Battery, CA
- Redesignated 3 June 1935 as the 34th Field Battery, RCA
- Redesignated 7 November 1940 as the 34th (Reserve) Field Battery, RCA
- Redesignated 1 April 1946 as the 34th Anti-Tank Battery (Self-Propelled), RCA
- Amalgamated 1 September 1954 with the 9th Anti-Tank Regiment (Self Propelled), RCA, The Hastings and Prince Edward Regiment and The Midland Regiment

=== 49th Regiment Hastings Rifles ===
- Originated 14 September 1866 in Stirling, Ontario, as the 49th Hastings Battalion of Infantry
- Redesignated 6 April 1871 as the 49th Hastings Battalion of Rifles
- Redesignated 8 May 1900 as the 49th Regiment Hastings Rifles
- Amalgamated 12 March 1920 with the 16th Prince Edward Regiment

=== The Midland Regiment ===
- Originated 5 October 1866 in Cobourg, Ontario, as the 40th Northumberland Battalion of Infantry
- Redesignated 8 May 1900 as the 40th Northumberland Regiment
- Redesignated 12 March 1920 as The Northumberland (Ontario) Regiment
- Redesignated 15 May 1924 as The Northumberland Regiment
- Amalgamated 15 December 1936 with The Durham Regiment and redesignated as The Midland Regiment (Northumberland and Durham)
- Redesignated 7 November 1940 as the 2nd (Reserve) Battalion, The Midland Regiment (Northumberland and Durham)
- Redesignated 1 June 1945 as The Midland Regiment (Northumberland and Durham)
- Redesignated 1 April 1946 as The Midland Regiment
- Amalgamated 1 September 1954 with the 9th Anti-Tank Regiment (Self Propelled), RCA, 34th Anti-Tank Battery (Self Propelled), RCA and The Hastings and Prince Edward Regiment.

=== The Durham Regiment ===
- Originated on 16 November 1866, in Port Hope, Ontario, as the 46th East Durham Battalion of Infantry
- Redesignated on 1 August 1897, as the 46th Durham Battalion of Infantry
- Redesignated on 8 May 1900, as the 46th Durham Regiment
- Redesignated on 12 March 1920, as The Durham Regiment
- Amalgamated on 15 December 1936, with The Northumberland Regiment and Redesignated as The Midland Regiment (Northumberland and Durham)

=== Lineage chart ===
Lineage chart

1812	1st Regt of Prince Edward Militia	1st Regt of Hastings Militia	1st Regt of Northumberland Militia	1st Regt of Durham Militia
1815	Disbanded	Disbanded	Disbanded	Disbanded
1863	The 15th Bn Volunteer Militia (Infy) Canada	16th Bn Volunteer Militia (Infy) Canada
1866	Active service (Note: March)	16th "Prince Edward" Bn of Infy	49th "Hastings" Bn of Infy	40th "Northumberland Bn of Infy"	46th "East Durham" Bn of Infy
1871	15th Bn or the Argyll Light Infy	49th "Hastings" Bn of Rifles
1885	Active service (Note: One company, April–July)	Active service	Active service	Active service
1897	46th "Durham" Bn of Infy
1900	15th Regt "Argyll Light Infy"	16th Prince Edward Regt	49th Regt "Hastings Rifles"	40th Northumberland Regt	46th Durham Regt
1905	9th Bde, CFA
1914	39th Bn, CEF
1915	155th "Overseas" Bn, CEF	80th "Overseas" Bn, CEF	139th "Overseas" Bn, CEF	136th "Overseas" Bn, CEF
1916	Absorbed by 154th "Overseas" Bn	9th Bde, CFA, CEF	Absorbed by 4th Canadian Div.	Absorbed by 36th Reserve Bn	Absorbed by 39th Reserve Bn
1917	Absorbed by 6th Reserve Bn	254th "Overseas" Infy Bn, CEF
1917	Absorbed by 6th Reserve Bn
1920	1st Bn (155th Bn, CEF), The Argyll Light Infy	Disbanded	1st Bn (39th Bn, CEF), The Hastings and Prince Edward Regt	2nd Bn (80th Bn, CEF), (Note: Reserve) The Hastings and Prince Edward Regt	3rd Bn (254th Bn, CEF), The Hastings and Prince Edward Regt	1st Bn (139th Bn, CEF), The Northumberland (Ontario) Regt	2nd Bn (235th Bn, CEF), The Northumberland (Ontario) Regt	1st Bn (136th Bn, CEF), The Durham Regt
1924	1st Bn (139th Bn, CEF)The Northumberland Regt	2nd Bn (235th Bn, CEF), The Northumberland Regt
1925	9th Fd Bde, CA
1926	1st Bn (39th Bn, CEF), The Northumberland Regt	2nd Bn (139th Bn, CEF), The Northumberland Regt
1935	9th Fd Bde, RCA
1936	The Argyll Light Infy (Tank)	The Hastings and Prince Edward Regt	Disbanded	Disbanded	Disbanded
1936	The Midland Regt (Northumberland and Durham)
1939	The Hastings and Prince Edward Regt, CASF
1940	The (Reserve) Argyll Light Infy (Tank)	9th (Reserve) Fd Bde, RCA	1st Bn, The Hastings and Prince Edward Regt, CASF	2nd (Reserve) Bn, The Hastings and Prince Edward Regt	The Midland Regt (Northumberland and Durham), CASF
1940	1st Bn, The Midland Regt (Northumberland and Durham), CASF	2nd (Reserve) Bn, The Midland Regt (Northumberland and Durham)
1942	44th (Reserve) Fd Regt, RCA
1945	Disbanded	2nd Canadian Infy Bn (The Hastings and Prince Edward Regt), CASF	Disbanded	The Midland Regt (Northumberland and Durham)
1945	Disbanded	The Hastings and Prince Edward Regt
1946	9th Anti-Tank Regt (Self-Propelled) (Argyll Light Infy), RCA	The Midland Regt
1951	"E" Coy, (Note: Regular Force) The Hastings and Prince Edward Regt	"F" Coy, The Hastings and Prince Edward Regt
1951	Absorbed by 1st Canadian Infy Bn
1952	Absorbed by 2nd Canadian Infy Bn
1954	The Hastings and Prince Edward Regt
2012	Perpetuates War of 1812 units

== Perpetuations ==
=== War of 1812 ===
Prior to the War of 1812 Upper Canada passed the Militia Act of 1808 in anticipation of threats coming from the Americans.

- 1st Regiment of Durham Militia
- 1st Regiment of Hastings Militia
- 1st Regiment of Northumberland Militia
- 1st Regiment of Prince Edward Militia

=== Great War ===
- 9th Brigade, Canadian Field Artillery, CEF
- 39th Battalion, CEF
- 80th Battalion, CEF
- 136th Battalion (Durham), CEF
- 139th Battalion (Northumberland), CEF
- 155th Battalion (Quinte), CEF
- 254th Battalion (Quinte's Own), CEF

== Operational history ==
=== Fenian Raids ===
The 15th Battalion Volunteer Militia (Infantry), Canada was called out on active service during the 1866 raids by the Fenian Brotherhood on 8 March 1866. The battalion was removed from active service on 27 March 1866 at the conclusion of the emergency.

=== North West Rebellion ===
The 15th Battalion Argyll Light Infantry, the 40th Northumberland Battalion of Infantry, the 46th East Durham Battalion of Infantry and The 49th Hastings Battalion of Rifles mobilized a company each for active service with The Midland Battalion on 10 April 1885. The Midland Battalion served in the Alberta Column of the North West Field Force until it was demobilized on 24 July 1885.

=== Great War ===
The 9th Brigade, Canadian Field Artillery, CEF, was authorized on 20 January 1916 and embarked for Great Britain on 15 February 1916. The Brigade arrived in France on 14 July 1916, where it fought as part of the 3rd Canadian Divisional Artillery in France and Flanders until the end of the war. The brigade was disbanded on 1 November 1920.

The 39th Battalion, CEF, was authorized on 7 November 1914 and embarked for Great Britain on 17 June 1915. It provided reinforcements to Canadian units in the field until 4 January 1917, when its personnel were absorbed by the 6th Reserve Battalion, CEF.

The 80th Battalion, CEF, was authorized on 10 July 1915 and embarked for Great Britain on 20 May 1916. It provided reinforcements to Canadian units in the field until 30 September 1916, when its personnel were absorbed by units of the 4th Canadian Division.

The 155th (Quinte) Battalion, CEF, was authorized on 22 December 1915 and embarked for Great Britain on 17 October 1916, where it provided reinforcements to Canadian units in the field until 8 December 1916, when its personnel were absorbed by the 154th (Stormont-Dundas-Glengarry) Battalion, CEF. The 39th, 80th and 155th Battalions were all disbanded on 17 July 1917.

The 136th (Durham) Battalion, CEF authorized on 22 December 1915 and embarked for Great Britain on 25 September 1916, where its personnel were absorbed by the 39th Reserve Battalion, CEF on 6 October 1916 to provide reinforcements to Canadian units in the field. The 136th Battalion was disbanded on 22 May 1917.

The 139th (Northumberland) Battalion, CEF, was authorized on 22 December 1915 and embarked for Great Britain on 27 September 1916 where its personnel were absorbed by the 36th Reserve Battalion, CEF on 6 October 1916 to provide reinforcements to Canadian units in the field. The battalion was disbanded on 21 May 1917.

The 254th Battalion (Quinte's Own), CEF, was authorized on 1 May 1917 and embarked for Great Britain on 2 June 1917, where its personnel were absorbed by the 6th Reserve Battalion, CEF, on 10 June 1917 to provide reinforcements to Canadian units in the field. The battalion was disbanded on 15 September 1917.

On 12 March 1920 the 16th Battalion Volunteer Militia (Infantry) Canada was amalgamated with the 49th Regiment Hastings Rifles to form The Hastings and Prince Edward Regiment.

=== Second World War ===
The Hastings and Prince Edward Regiment, CASF, mobilized for active service on 1 September 1939 and was redesignated the 1st Battalion, The Hastings and Prince Edward Regiment, CASF, on 7 November 1940. The unit embarked for Great Britain on 22 December 1939, and on 13 June 1940 it went to France as part of the Second British Expeditionary Force, reaching a point beyond Laval before being ordered back to the United Kingdom. It landed in Sicily on 10 July 1943, and in Italy on 3 September 1943, as part of the 1st Canadian Infantry Brigade, 1st Canadian Infantry Division. On 10 March 1945, the battalion moved with the I Canadian Corps to northwest Europe, where it fought until the end of the war. The overseas battalion was disbanded on 15 October 1945. On 1 June 1945, a second Battalion of the regiment was mobilized for service in the Pacific theatre of operations as the 2nd Canadian Infantry Battalion (The Hastings and Prince Edward Regiment), CASF. The 2nd Battalion was disbanded on 1 November 1945.

Details from The Midland Regiment were called out on service on 26 August 1939 and then placed on active service on 1 September 1939, for local protection duties under the designation The Midland Regiment (Northumberland and Durham), CASF (Details). These details were disbanded on 31 December 1940. The regiment then mobilized The Midland Regiment (Northumberland and Durham), CASF, for active service on 24 May 1940 and was redesignated the 1st Battalion, The Midland Regiment (Northumberland and Durham), CASF, on 7 November 1940. The 1st Battalion served in Canada in a home defence role as part of the Prince Rupert Defences, 8th Canadian Infantry Division. The Battalion embarked for Great Britain on 10 January 1945, where it was disbanded on 18 January 1945 to provide reinforcements to the Canadian Army in the field.

The 34th Field Battery, RCA, and the 32nd (Kingston) Field Battery, RCA, mobilized the 32nd/34th Field Battery, RCA, CASF, for active service on 24 May 1940. This unit was subsequently reorganized as two separate batteries on 1 January 1941, designated as the 32nd (Kingston) Field Battery, RCA, CASF, and the 34th Field Battery, RCA, CASF. On D-Day, 6 June 1944, it landed in Normandy, France, as part of the 14th Field Regiment, RCA, CASF, which fought as a unit of the 3rd Canadian Infantry Division in North-West Europe until the end of the war. The overseas battery was disbanded on 2 November 1945. The battery later mobilized the 2nd/34th Field Battery, RCA, CAOF, on 1 June 1945 for service with the Canadian Army Occupation Force in Germany. This battery was disbanded on 28 March 1946.

=== Cold War ===
On 4 May 1951, the Hastings and Prince Edward Regiment mobilized two temporary Active Force companies designated "E" and "F". "E" Company was reduced to nil strength upon its personnel being incorporated into the 1st Canadian Infantry Battalion for service in Germany with the North Atlantic Treaty Organization. It was disbanded on 29 July 1953. "F" Company was initially used as a reinforcement pool for "E" Company. On 15 May 1952, it was reduced to nil strength, upon its personnel being absorbed by the newly formed 2nd Canadian Infantry Battalion for service in Korea with the United Nations. "F" Company was disbanded on 29 July 1953.

In 1953 the 2nd Canadian Infantry Battalion became the 4th Battalion, The Canadian Guards.

=== War in Afghanistan ===
The regiment contributed personnel to the various Task Forces which served in Afghanistan between 2002 and 2014.

== Alliances ==
- United Kingdom – The Princess of Wales's Royal Regiment (Queen's and Royal Hampshires)

== Battle honours ==
Regimental colour

In the list below, battle honours in capitals were awarded for participation in large operations and campaigns, while those in lowercase indicate honours granted for more specific battles. Those battle honours followed by a "+" are emblazoned on the regimental guidon.

=== War of 1812 ===
Honorary distinction:

- The non-emblazonable honorary distinction DEFENCE OF CANADA – 1812–1815 – DÉFENSE DU CANADA

=== South African War ===
- South Africa, 1900

=== North-West Rebellion ===
- NORTH WEST CANADA, 1885

=== Great War ===
- MOUNT SORREL 2–13 June 1916+
- SOMME, 1916 1 July-18 November 1916+
- ARRAS, 1917, '18 8 April-4 May 1917 and 26 August-3 September 1918+
- Ypres 1917 31 July-10 November 1917+
- HILL 70 15–25 August 1917+
- AMIENS 8–11 August 1918+
- HINDENBURG LINE 12 September-9 October 1918+
- PURSUIT TO MONS 28 September-11 November 1918+

=== Second World War ===
- LANDING IN SICILY 9–12 July 1943
- Grammichele 15 July 1943
- Valguarnera 17–19 July 1943
- Assoro 20–22 July 1943+
- Agira 24–28 July 1943
- ADRANO 29 July–7 August 1943
- Regalbuto 29 July–3 August 1943
- SICILY, 1943+
- Landing at Reggio 3 September 1943
- Motta Montecorvino 1–3 October 1943
- Campobasso 11–14 October 1943
- Torella 24–27 October 1943
- The Moro 5–7 December 1943+
- San Leonardo 8–9 December 1943
- The Gully 10–19 December 1943
- Ortona 20–28 December 1943
- CASSINO II 11–18 May 1944+
- Gustav Line 11–18 May 1944
- LIRI VALLEY 18–30 May 1944
- Hitler Line 18–24 May 1944+
- GOTHIC LINE 25 August–22 September 1944+
- LAMONE CROSSING 2–13 September 1944
- Misano Ridge
- Bulgaria Village 13–14 September 1944
- RIMINI LINE 14–21 September 1944+
- San Fortunato 18–20 September 1944+
- Naviglio Canal 12–15 December 1944
- Fosso Vecchio 16–18 December 1944
- ITALY, 1943–1945+
- Apeldoorn 11–17 April 1945
- NORTH-WEST EUROPE, 1945+

== Customs and traditions ==
Members of the regiment who have died are said to have transferred to the White Battalion.

The regiment's mascot is a wooden Indian named Chief Petawawa-Much, who was taken on strength to replace Little Chief, a massive pewter Indian taken from the roof of a canning factory in Picton prior to the regiment's departure for England in 1939. Little Chief was lost during the Battle of France while the regiment evacuated. An unknown individual, in the interest of securing Chief Petawawa-Much's future, got him a social insurance number.

The regiment celebrates Pachino Day on 10 July every year with a spaghetti dinner, traditionally served with the cheapest red wine available. This is to commemorate the unit's participation in the landings in Sicily on 10 July 1943 as part of Operation HUSKY.

In the Warrant Officers' & Sergeants' Mess in Belleville, the footprints of commanding officers can be found on the ceiling of the games room. After a change of command, a pyramid is formed with junior officers on the bottom to hoist the new CO up to the ceiling to make his mark.

The former regimental colour was stolen from its case in the Belleville Armouries in 1960. The staff for it was laid up with the queen's colour at Saint Mary Magdalene Anglican Church in Picton on 4 October 1964. The commanding officer at the time, Lieutenant-Colonel Angus Duffy, refused to wear his cap badge after the theft up until his death, as the colours were his personal responsibility. The former regimental colour has never been located. The current colours were granted to the regiment in 1970.

== Notable soldiers ==
- Sir Mackenzie Bowell: the fifth prime minister of Canada, served during the Fenian raids as a captain with the 15th Argyll Light Infantry and later retired from a long career with the Canadian Militia in 1874 with the rank of lieutenant-colonel in the 49th (Hastings) Battalion of Rifles (a founding regiment.)
- John Buchan, 2nd Baron Tweedsmuir served during the Second World War.
- Golf course architect Geoffrey Cornish served as an officer (retired as major) during the Second World War.
- Angus B. Duffy MC enlisted as a private. He later received his commission and eventually retired a lieutenant-colonel and commanding officer. Prior to commissioning, he was notable as having been a warrant officer class 1 and the regimental sergeant major during much of the Second World War.
- Harry Fox MBE was the regimental sergeant major of the regiment throughout 1944 and 1945. His memoir Born Lucky, One D-Day Dodger's Story was published in 2005.
- Lieutenant-General Howard Douglas Graham: Commanded the regiment from 1940 to 1941 and was later chief of the General Staff of the Canadian Army from 1955 to 1958.
- Corporal Mark Robert McLaren: served as a member of the regiment from 2002 to 2007 before transferring the Regular Force with the 1st Battalion of the Royal Canadian Regiment. He was an Afghanistan veteran wounded during the A-10 strike incident which killed Private Mark Graham in 2006. Corporal McLaren was awarded the Medal of Military Valour for his devotion to duty in the presence of the enemy. On 6 November 2008, Corporal McLaren's joint Canadian-Afghan patrol was ambushed in Kandahar Province in Afghanistan. The attack seriously injured his team's Afghan interpreter, paralyzing him and leaving him exposed to further enemy fire. Heedless to the incoming fire, Corporal McLaren crawled 10 metres to his colleague's position, extracted him to a safe location and administered first aid. Corporal McLaren's courage and selfless devotion to his team prevented the interpreter's immediate loss and allowed for his safe evacuation. Corporal McLaren was subsequently killed in action on his second tour on 5 December by an improvised explosive device on his armoured vehicle during a joint patrol with Afghan National Army soldiers in the Arghandab District, west of Kandahar City. A Canadian Coast Guard Hero-class patrol vessel, CCGS Corporal McLaren M.M.V., was named after him and was in service 2013–2018.
- Canadian Author Farley Mowat: served as a platoon commander and as the regiment's intelligence officer during the Second World War. He authored four books about the regiment and his experiences during the war: The Regiment, And No Birds Sang, My Fathers' Son and Aftermath. Mowat left with the rank of captain.
- Private Harold Pringle: the only soldier of the Canadian Army to be executed for a service offence during the Second World War and was also the last Canadian soldier to be executed. He was executed by firing squad.

== Armouries ==
Site	Date(s)	Designated	Location	Province	Description	Image
Belleville Armoury, 187 Pinnacle Street	1907-8	Canada's Register of Historic Places;1992 Recognized – Register of the Government of Canada Heritage Buildings	Belleville	Ontario	Houses The Hastings and Prince Edward Regiment, Regimental Headquarters and one company (A Coy/Assoro Coy); This centrally located, low-pitched gambrel-roofed, stone and brick building features a pair of tall towers.	
Peterborough Drill Hall; 220 Murray Street	1907-8 (completed) David Ewart	1989 National Historic Sites of Canada; 1990 Classified on the Register of the Government of Canada Heritage Buildings	Peterborough; 44°18′31.16″N 78°19′20.26″W	Ontario	"Riding a wave of national price and military enthusiasm following the South African War (1899–1902), the Canadian government embarked on a major reform of the nation's defence system. The new program included an expanded and upgraded militia and the construction of new armouries across the country. Recalling a Baronial style fortress in its turrets, arched troop doors and crenellated roof line, this is one of the largest and best designed examples from this period. It is home to the Hastings and Prince Edward Regiment of the Canadian Armed Forces (Reserve)."	A detail of the exterior of the Peterborough armoury
Cobourg Armoury, 210 Willmott Street			Cobourg	Ontario	Houses the Hastings and Prince Edward Regiment "C Company" or "Cassino Company", in an industrial mall unit.	

== Hastings and Prince Edward Regiment Museum ==
Hastings and Prince Edward Regiment Museum
- Location: Belleville Armoury, 187 Pinnacle Street in Belleville, Ontario, Canada
- Type: Regimental Museum

The Hastings and Prince Edward Regiment Museum is located in the Belleville Armoury in Belleville. The museum preserves the history of the militia, specifically the Hastings and Prince Edward Regiment, through the collection and preservation of military artifacts and documents of historical significance to the Regiment and its antecedent units. The museum displays and illustrates in an appropriate manner the dress, weapons, and military equipment, and customs of the Regiment's heritage. It serves as a training medium to teach regimental history and to provide a scholarly basis for those studying the history of the militia, the Regiment and its antecedent units, and their historical significance in the Midland District of Ontario. The museum fosters in the local community an interest and sense of pride in the Regiment and its accomplishments.

The museum focuses on the history of the regiment, its activities in different wars, and the effect on area counties. Exhibits include uniforms, weapons, medals, equipment, photographs, and other military and regimental memorabilia. The museum is open several days a week.

The museum is affiliated with: CMA, CHIN, OMMC and Virtual Museum of Canada.

== See also ==
- The Canadian Crown and the Canadian Forces
- Organization of Military Museums of Canada
- Military history of Canada
- History of the Canadian Army
- List of armouries in Canada
- Canadian Forces

== Order of precedence ==
Preceded by The Princess of Wales' Own Regiment	The Hastings and Prince Edward Regiment	Succeeded by The Lincoln and Welland Regiment

== Notes and references ==
- The Regiment (1955) is an account of the Hastings and Prince Edward Regiment written by Canadian author Farley Mowat, who served as an officer with the regiment during the Second World War.
- Duffy's Regiment: A History of the Hastings and Prince Edward Regiment by Kenneth B. Smith (14 Dec 2012)
- Decorations and Awards Received During World War II 1939-1945 By the Hastings and Prince Edward Regiment by R.D. Bradford (1986)
- "And No Birds Sang" (1979) explains Farley Mowat's experiences with the Regiment and the invasion of Sicily.
