= 254th Division =

254th Division may refer to:

- 254th Infantry Division, Wehrmacht, Germany
- 254th Rifle Division, Soviet Union, later the 254th Motor Rifle Division

== See also ==
- List of military divisions by number
- 254th (disambiguation)
