= Battle of Batoche =

1885 decisive battle of the North-West Rebellion

- Part of the North-West Rebellion
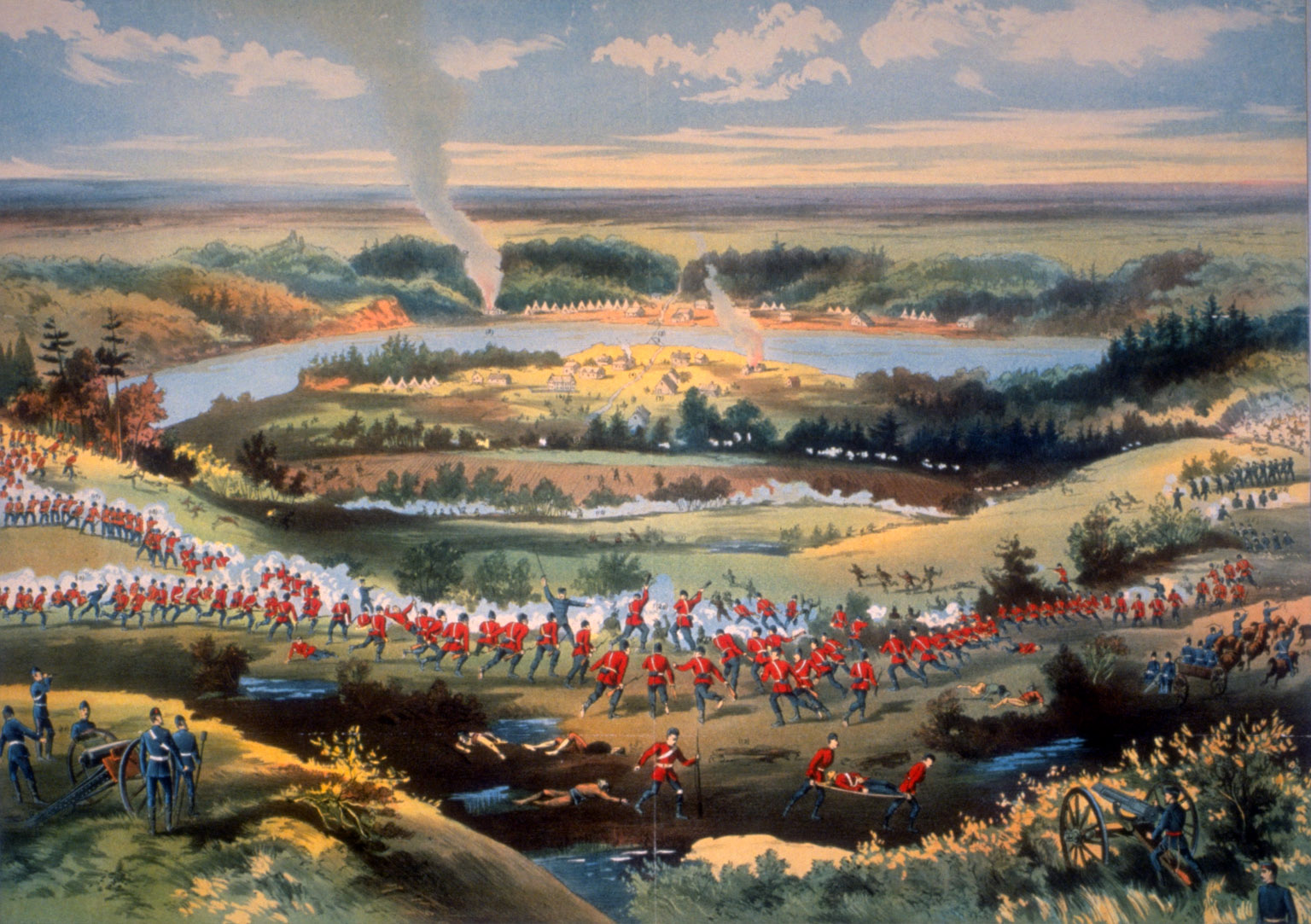
- Contemporary lithograph of the Battle of Batoche
Date	May 9–12, 1885
Location	Batoche, Saskatchewan
Result	Canadian victory: Collapse of the Provisional Government of Saskatchewan

Belligerents
Provisional Government of Saskatchewan (Métis)	Canada

Commanders and leaders
Gabriel Dumont; Louis Riel	Frederick Middleton; Bowen van Straubenzee

Strength
250 (Métis)	916 regulars and militia

Casualties and losses
Per Middleton: 51 dead; 173 wounded; Per Vegreville: 16 dead; 20–30 wounded	8 dead; 46 wounded; 1 steamboat damaged

The Battle of Batoche was the decisive battle of the North-West Resistance, which pitted Canadian Militia units against a force of First Nations and Métis people. Fought from May 9 to 12, 1885, at the ad hoc Provisional Government of Saskatchewan capital of Batoche, the greater numbers and superior firepower of General Frederick Middleton's force eventually overwhelmed the Métis fighters.

The defeat of the defenders of Batoche and its capture led to the surrender of Louis Riel on May 15 and the collapse of the Provisional Government.

Other groups were pursued and eventually gave up the struggle as well. Poundmaker surrendered on May 26 at Battleford after a long siege. Cree fighters and families under Big Bear held out the longest. They fought off Canadian troops pursuing them in the Battle of Frenchman's Butte and Battle of Loon Lake. They gradually dwindled in number, disappearing into the bush along the way. Big Bear eventually turned himself in to the North-West Mounted Police at Fort Carlton in early July.

== Background ==
Batoche was the capital of Louis Riel's Provisional Government of Saskatchewan. Prior to the battle, trenches and concealed rifle pits had been dug around Batoche's perimeter.

== Early advances and the crippling of the Northcote ==
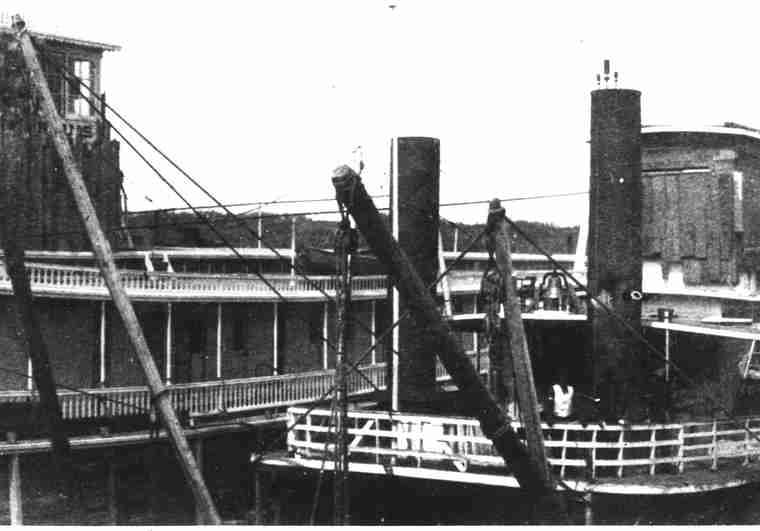
The damaged steamboat Northcote after the battle. Damaged on its way to Batoche, its crippling delayed the advance of government troops.

Conscious of the numerous reverses that had been suffered by government forces in previous clashes with the rebels (see the battles of Duck Lake, Fish Creek, and Cut Knife), Middleton approached Batoche with caution, reaching Gabriel's Crossing on 7 May and advancing within eight miles (13 km) of the town the following day. Middleton's plan rested on an encirclement strategy: as his main contingent advanced and came in contact with Métis defensive lines, the steamboat Northcote, carrying some of Middleton's troops, would steam past the distracted defenders and unload fifty troops at the rear of the town, effectively closing the pincer.

However, due to the difficulty of the terrain and Middleton's penchant for prudence, his ground troops lagged behind schedule. When the Northcote appeared adjacent to the town on 9 May it was spotted by Métis rebels who had not yet come under fire from the advancing ground troops. The rebels' small arms fire did little damage because of the improvised armour that protected the large boat. They lowered Batoche's ferry cable, and the Northcote steamed unsuspectingly into it, slicing off its masts and smokestacks. Crippled, the ship drifted harmlessly down the South Saskatchewan River and out of the battle.

== Battle ==
=== Mission Ridge (9 May) ===
Ignorant of the Northcote's fate, Middleton approached the church at Mission Ridge on the morning of 9 May in order to bring his plan into effect. Some Métis in two houses south of the church began firing at Boulton's Scouts (irregular Canadian cavalry), but artillery was brought up to shell the houses, one of which caught fire. The Métis sharpshooters fled toward the settlement. The troops advanced toward the church. As they approached the church and nearby rectory, they saw some people near those buildings whom they took to be the enemy. Second Lieutenant Arthur L. Howard, a Gatling gun expert on leave from the Connecticut National Guard, fired his Gatling gun at the rectory. Then a white flag was unfurled, Howard's firing stopped, and several priests, nuns, women and children came across the lines. Finding the mission occupied only by civilians, Middleton brought his artillery out onto the ridge and began shelling the town.

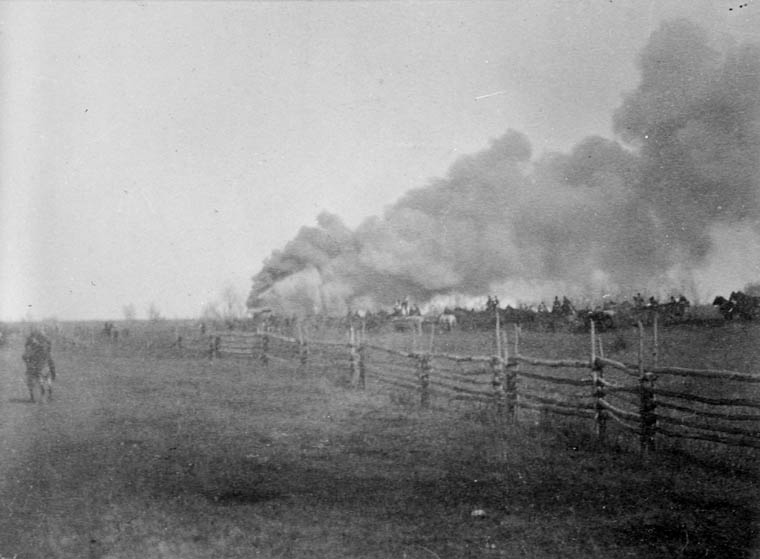
A house in Batoche in flames during the opening stages of the battle

The soldiers began advancing past the church, and got about half a kilometre before they came under heavy fire from both sides of the trail. The militia immediately took cover. Their enemies, hidden in well-constructed rifle pits, were invisible. One trooper later wrote: "[The militia was] down some distance apart from each other, firing at nothing, making guess shots and hearing the rebel bullets zip all round you, and the everlasting clack as the bullets struck the trees."

The now-dismounted irregular militia cavalry, Boulton's and French's Scouts, were deployed on the right. The 10th Royal Grenadiers, militia infantry from Toronto, were in the centre, with the 90th Winnipeg Rifles militia, and Howard and his Gatling on the left, to protect the artillery. The infantry of the Midland Battalion, militia from eastern Ontario, were kept in reserve near the church, which was now being used as a Canadian field hospital. A very dangerous situation developed when a group of Métis rushed the artillery. Only Howard's directing a heavy stream of Gatling fire at the attackers prevented a disaster. From these few minutes the frustrated soldiers got the only clear view of the Métis fighters that they were to have until the final moments of the battle, three days later.

After the attack was repulsed, the artillery was pulled back a couple of hundred meters, and the infantry and dismounted Scouts followed suit. The Métis then redeployed their men to try to outflank the militia, and heavy fighting ensued. After noon, the artillery was ordered forward again, and it began fruitlessly bombarding the invisible Métis rifle pits. The gunners were under heavy fire, in a very unsafe position. The Midlanders, who had been brought forward from the church, wanted to charge their unseen enemies, but were ordered not to by Middleton.

Throughout, the Gatling gun was used to good effect, providing covering fire for the withdrawal of cannon that had come under sniper fire, and dispersing another attempt by Gabriel Dumont to capture the guns.

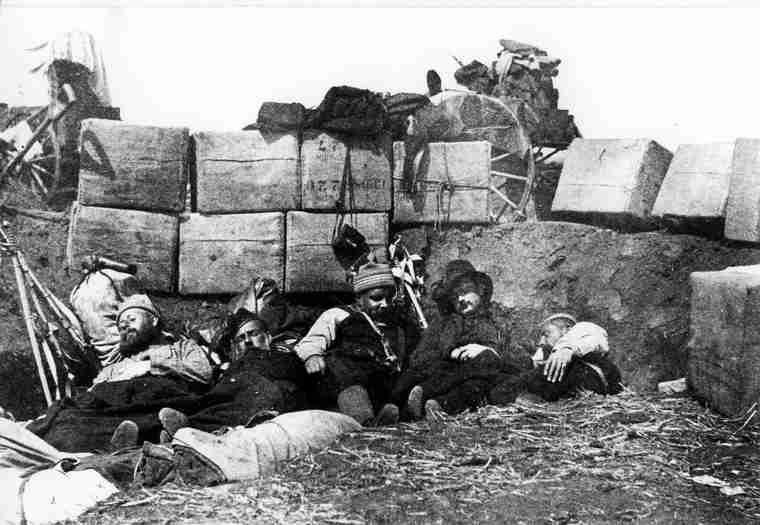
Towards the end of the first day of the battle, Gen. Frederick Middleton ordered Canadian soldiers to retire into makeshift fortifications.

Canadian advances saw less success but were carefully conducted, keeping casualties to a minimum. A Métis attempt to surround the Canadian lines failed when the brushfires meant to screen the sortie failed to spread. At the end of the day, both sides held their positions at Mission Ridge. But Middleton, shaken by the fierce resistance, ordered the Canadian soldiers to retire to a zareba, a hastily improvised fortification about a mile from the Métis entrenchments, where the troops retired to sleep behind their network of improvised barricades.

=== Probing attacks (10 May to 11 May) ===
On 10 May, Middleton established heavily defended gunpits and conducted a devastating, day-long shelling of the town. Attempted advances, however, were turned back by Métis fire, and no ground was gained. The next day, Middleton gauged the strength of the defenders by dispatching a contingent of men north along the enemy's flank while simultaneously conducting a general advance along the front. Having redirected a portion of their strength to hold the northward flank, the Métis lacked the manpower to oppose the Canadian thrust, ceding ground with little resistance. Canadian soldiers ventured as far as the Batoche cemetery before turning back. Satisfied with his enemies' weakness, Middleton retired to sleep and contended to take the town in the morning.

=== Storming of Batoche (12 May) ===
By 12 May, Métis defences were in poor shape. Of the original defenders, three-quarters had either been wounded by artillery fire or were scattered and divided in the many clashes with the Canadians on the outskirts of the town. Those that still held their positions were fatigued and desperately short of ammunition. They resorted to hunting in the underbrush for bullets fired by Canadian troops and firing them back and some fired nails and rocks, forks and knives, instead of bullets, out of their rifles.

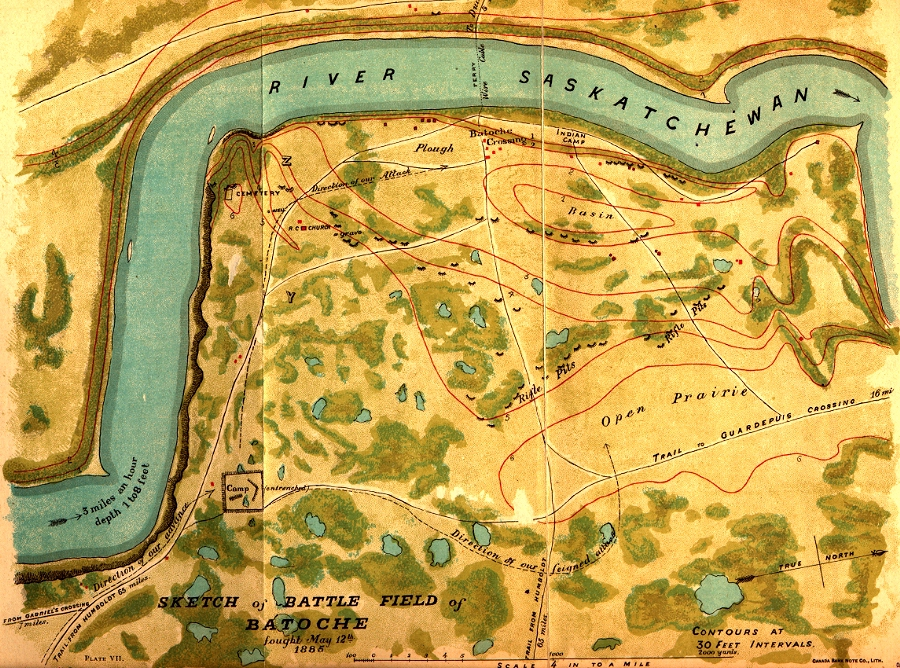
Battlefield map of Batoche

Middleton's attack plan on this day was designed to mirror the success of the previous day's flanking feint, with one column drawing defenders away to the north and a second, under Colonel Bowen van Straubenzee, assaulting the town directly. At first, on the morning of 12 May, Middleton's plan went awry. Van Straubenzee and his men did not attack, because the wind was blowing away from them and they did not hear the sound of the north column's gunfire. Middleton, who had been with the north column, returned to the camp in a rage because van Straubenzee had not attacked. He shouted abuse at van Straubenzee and the Canadian colonels, and stalked off to lunch.

The previous night, some of the senior Canadian officers, exasperated by Middleton's caution, had discussed undertaking a charge. Now van Straubenzee was more amenable to this, as well. After noon, the Midlanders and Royal Grenadiers moved forward again, to a point near the Batoche Cemetery. No one knows precisely who ordered the wild mass Canadian charge which now ensued. Firing at will, and cheering, the Midlanders and Grenadiers, aided by the Winnipeg 90th Rifles, rushed at the Métis rifle pits. Many of the Métis fighters were still out of position, having been drawn away from the cemetery and church to the north-east by Middleton's feint that morning. Ammunition on the Métis side was very low. Nevertheless, they resisted bravely, aided by sharpshooters firing from across the Saskatchewan River at the charging militiamen.

However, the charge was irresistible. Middleton ordered the rest of the troops to assist by covering the flank of the charging men. Howard and his Gatling were moved up. The charging militia stormed into the village of Batoche. Then their enemies rallied. Métis and First Nations who had been drawn away to the east by Middleton's feint in the morning now appeared, and commenced a heavy fire from rifle pits in brush near the village. A senior Canadian officer, Captain French, was killed as he fired from a second story window. But the artillery and the Gatling were brought up to break this new resistance. The last defenders of Batoche surrendered.

Straubenzee's soldiers charged into Batoche, driving the remaining Métis clear of the town.

Middleton's plan, plus an impetuous charge by Canadian militia had seen the last defenders overrun, and resistance at Batoche ended.

== Aftermath ==
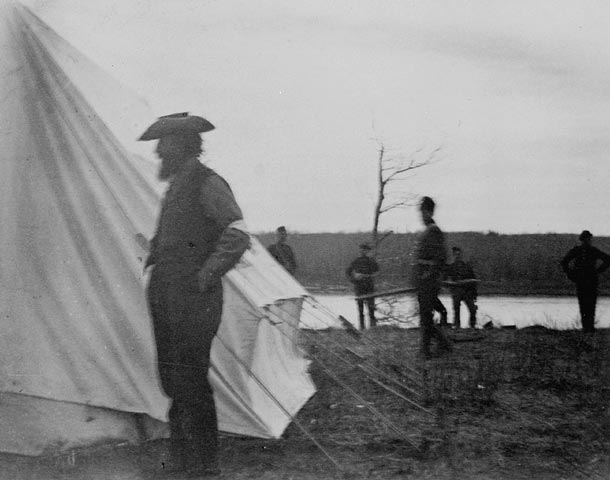
Louis Riel as a prisoner at Gen. Middleton's camp. Riel surrendered to Canadian soldiers on 15 May, shortly after the Battle of Batoche.

The Métis defeat at Batoche virtually ended the North-West Resistance.

Louis Riel was captured and was hanged for treason in Regina on 16 November.

Gabriel Dumont fled to the United States, returning to Batoche in 1893. When he died, his body was buried there.

Poundmaker and Big Bear both were sentenced to prison terms.

Amnesty was granted for rank-and-file fighters. However, several murders that had taken place outside the fighting were punished. The largest mass hanging in Canadian history took the lives of eight men in November 1885.

Middleton's forces proceeded north to Prince Albert, Saskatchewan and some portions were disbanded without delay and sent home in Eastern Canada.

=== Casualties ===
Middleton reported 8 deaths and 46 wounded on the Canadian side and 51 deaths and 173 wounded on the Métis side. Later, Father Vegreville's report claimed that the Métis loss was not as high as the Mission first reported to Middleton. Vegreville's report claimed that there were 16 Métis killed and between 20 and 30 wounded during the battle, which is still slightly higher than the one commonly accepted by modern historians, which is 12 dead and 20 wounded. Nine of the Métis killed in the battle were buried in the cemetery of Batoche. Eight were in a common grave.

=== Bell of Batoche ===
Following the battle, it is claimed that several Canadian soldiers from Millbrook, Ontario, seized the bell from the Batoche church and took it back to Ontario as a prize. The fate of the bell became an issue of longstanding controversy, involving several Métis organizations and the provincial governments of Ontario, Manitoba, and Saskatchewan. The Millbrook bell is now identified as the identical Bell of Frog Lake.

== Legacy ==
BATOCHE. In 1872, Xavier Letendre dit Batoche founded a village at this site where Métis freighters crossed the South Saskatchewan River. About 50 families had claimed the river lots in the area by 1884. Widespread anxiety regarding land claims and a changing economy provoked a resistance against the Canadian Government. Here, 300 Métis and First Nations led by Louis Riel and Gabriel Dumont fought a force of 800 men commanded by Major-General Middleton between May 9 and 12, 1885. The resistance failed but the battle did not mean the end of the community of Batoche.

— Historic Sites and Monuments board of Canada. Government of Canada

In the spring of 2008, Tourism, Parks, Culture and Sport Minister Christine Tell proclaimed in Duck lake, that "the 125th commemoration, in 2010, of the 1885 Northwest Resistance is an excellent opportunity to tell the story of the prairie Métis and First Nations peoples' struggle with Government forces and how it has shaped Canada today."

Batoche, where the Métis Provisional Government had been formed, has been declared a national historic site. Batoche marks the site of Gabriel Dumont's grave site, Albert Caron's House, Batoche school, Batoche cemetery, Letendre store, Gabriel's river crossing, Gardepy's crossing, Batoche crossing, St. Antoine de Padoue Church, Métis rifle pits, and Canadian militia's battle camp.

== Maps ==
- Military Map Battlefield of Batoche
- Military Map of Mission Ridge
- Military Map of Batoche (Position May 9)
- Military Map of Batoche Rifle Pits
- Photo Collection (Glenbow Archives)
