= 254th =

254th may refer to:

- 254th (City of London) Regiment, Royal Artillery, volunteer field artillery unit of the British Army between 1863 and 1971
- 254th Battalion (Quinte's Own), CEF, unit in the Canadian Expeditionary Force during the First World War
- 254th Combat Communications Group (254 CCG) a unit of the Texas Air National Guard located at Hensley Field, Dallas, Texas
- 254th Fighter Aviation Regiment, aviation regiment established in 1944 as 1st Yugoslav Fighter Regiment
- 254th Indian Tank Brigade, armoured brigade of the Indian Army during World War II
- 254 (East of England) Medical Regiment, Royal Army Medical Corps, regiment of the British Army Reserve
- 254th Motor Rifle Division, motorized infantry division of the Soviet Army during the Cold War and later the Ukrainian Army
- 254th pope or Pope Gregory XVI (1765–1846), born Bartolomeo Alberto Cappellari, became pope on 2 February 1831
- 254th Tunnelling Company, one of the tunnelling companies of the Royal Engineers created by the British Army during World War I
- Riverdale-West 254th Street station, commuter rail stop on the Metro-North Railroad's Hudson Line

== See also ==
- 254 (number)
- 254, the year 254 (CCLIV) of the Julian calendar
- 254 BC
