= James Lyons Biggar (general) =

Canadian general

James Lyons Biggar CMG
- Born: 16 July 1856; Carrying Place, Ontario
- Died: 19 February 1922 (aged 65); Toronto
- Military career
- Branch: Canadian Militia
- Service years: 1881-1920
- Rank: Major General
- Unit: Argyll Light Infantry
- Commands: Deputy Adjutant General, Canadian Militia Director of Supplies and Transport, Canadian Army Service Corps Quartermaster General, Canadian Militia
- Conflicts: Second Boer War; First World War
- Awards: Companion of the Order of St Michael and St George

James Lyons Biggar, CMG (16 July 1856 – 19 February 1922) was one of Canada's earliest senior military officers.

== Early life ==
He was born to James Lyons Biggar M.P. at Carrying Place, Ontario. He attended school locally (Trenton Grammar School) and at Upper Canada College, Toronto. Canada was a young country, having become a federal and provincial political entity in 1867 through the process known as Canadian Confederation. As the nation grew and matured with the addition of new provinces, so too did the nation begin to develop its own unique institutions including: the courts of law, customs and tariffs, and the military, among others. In 1881, Biggar entered military service (permanent force) as a lieutenant in the 15th Battalion, Argyll Light Infantry, serving with that unit until 1901. In 1882 he married Mary Scott Elliot. The Biggars had three children: namely, Arthur Lyons, Violet Isabel and Percival Elliot.

== South African War ==
During the period 1898 to 1902, and subsequently, in 1914 to 1919, Canada responded to international requests for aid by authorizing the deployment of military forces abroad thereby establishing an enviable tradition. First, the South African War, also known as the Boer War (1898–1902) was largely a British undertaking although support was provided from across the British Empire. Biggar, then a Lieutenant Colonel, was one of the Canadian Staff Officers on location for all the major campaigns. As well, he was staff officer for overseas colonials. Biggar headed the 15th Canadian Field Hospital and served with distinction. At the conclusion of the South African War, Biggar returned to Canada where he became a Senior Staff Officer at Headquarters in Ottawa. Subsequently, he was appointed deputy adjutant general, and was tasked to organize the Canadian Army Service Corps. He also became the Director of Supplies and Transport.

== First World War ==
During the period from 1914 to 1919, as a member of the British Empire (later known as the British Commonwealth), Canada established The Canadian Expeditionary Force in support of her allies as a result of Germany's continuing aggression in Europe. With the onslaught of the First World War, and because of his prior experience, Biggar was tasked to organize the No. 13 Field Ambulance in Victoria, British Columbia in 1916 as a component of the 4th Canadian Division.

In 1917 Biggar was promoted to Quartermaster General to facilitate the war effort in an effective and efficient manner.

During this war, Canada had raised a force of 600,000 in spite of its national population being only six million. Of those, 60,000 were subsequently killed. As a direct result of the heroic efforts and sacrifices made by so many Canadians, Canada won wide respect and support in becoming an independent country.

In 1920 Biggar retired from the Canadian Militia after 39 years of distinguished service for his country.

He died at Toronto 19 February 1922.

== Legacy ==
Erected by his wife and children, a memorial plaque at St. Andrew's Presbyterian Church (Ottawa) is dedicated to Major General James Lyons Biggar, C.M.G., Quartermaster General of Canada.
