= Northumberland Regiment =

- Active: 1866-1936
- Country: Province of Canada 1866–1867; Canada 1867–1936
- Branch: Canadian Militia
- Type: Line infantry
- Role: Infantry regiment
- Part of: Non-Permanent Active Militia
- Garrison/HQ: Cobourg, Ontario
- Engagements: North-West Rebellion; Second Boer War; First World War
- Battle honours: See #Battle Honours

The Northumberland Regiment was an infantry regiment of the Non-Permanent Active Militia of the Canadian Militia (now the Canadian Army). In 1936, the regiment was amalgamated with The Durham Regiment to form The Midland Regiment (which now forms part of The Hastings and Prince Edward Regiment).

== History ==
=== North West Rebellion ===
On 10 April 1885, the 40th Northumberland Battalion of Infantry mobilized a company for active service with The Midland Battalion where it served in the Alberta Column of the North West Field Force. On 24 July 1885, the company was removed from active service.

=== Early 1900s ===
On 8 May 1900, the 40th Northumberland Battalion of Infantry was redesignated as the 40th Northumberland Regiment.

=== Great War ===
On 7 November 1914, the 39th Battalion, CEF was authorized for service and on 17 June 1915, the battalion embarked for Great Britain. After its arrival in the UK, the battalion provided reinforcements to the Canadian Corps in the field. On 4 January 1917, the battalion's personnel were absorbed by the 6th Reserve Battalion, CEF.

On 22 December 1915, the 139th (Northumberland) Battalion, CEF was authorized for service and on 27 September 1916, the battalion embarked for Great Britain. After its arrival in the UK, on 6 October 1916, the battalion's personnel were absorbed by the 36th Reserve Battalion, CEF to provide reinforcements to the Canadian Corps in the field. On 21 May 1917, the 139th Battalion, CEF was disbanded.

Lieutenant Wallace Lloyd Algie was posthumously awarded the VC for actions on 11 October 1918, near Iwuy, France, while serving with the 20th Battalion CEF.

=== 1920s-1930s ===
On 15 March 1920, as a result of the Otter Commission and the following post-war reorganization of the militia, the 40th Northumberland Regiment was redesignated as The Northumberland (Ontario) Regiment and was reorganized with two battalions (one of them a paper-only reserve battalion) to perpetuate the assigned war-raised battalions of the Canadian Expeditionary Force.

On 15 May 1924, the regiment was redesignated for the final time as The Northumberland Regiment.

As a result of the 1936 Canadian Militia Reorganization, on 15 December 1936, The Northumberland Regiment was amalgamated with The Durham Regiment to form The Midland Regiment (Northumberland and Durham).

== Organization ==
=== 40th Northumberland Battalion of Infantry (5 October 1866) ===
- Regimental Headquarters (Cobourg, Canada West)
- No. 1 Company (Cobourg) (first raised on 24 January 1856 as the 1st Volunteer Militia Rifle Company of Cobourg)
- No. 2 Company (Cobourg) (first raised on 6 February 1863 as the Volunteer Militia Company of Infantry)
- No. 3 Company (Campbellford) (first raised on 30 January 1863 as a Volunteer Militia Company of Infantry)
- No. 4 Company (Brighton) (first raised on 20 July 1866 as an Infantry Company)
- No. 5 Company (Cold Springs) (first raised on 17 August 1866 as an Infantry Company)
- No. 6 Company (Grafton) (first raised on 17 August 1866 as an Infantry Company)

=== The Northumberland (Ontario) Regiment (15 September 1920) ===
- 1st Battalion (perpetuating the 139th Battalion, CEF)
- 2nd (Reserve) Battalion (perpetuating the 235th Battalion, CEF)

== Alliances ==
United Kingdom - The Royal Northumberland Fusiliers (Until 1936)

== Battle honours ==
- Mount Sorrel
- Somme, 1916 (Note: Selected to be borne on colours and appointments)
- Arras, 1917, '18 ("Arras, 1917" selected to be borne on colours and appointments)
- Hill 70
- Ypres, 1917
- Amiens
- Hindenburg Line
- Pursuit to Mons
