= Arthur L. Howard =

American firearms expert

Arthur Lockhart Howard DSO
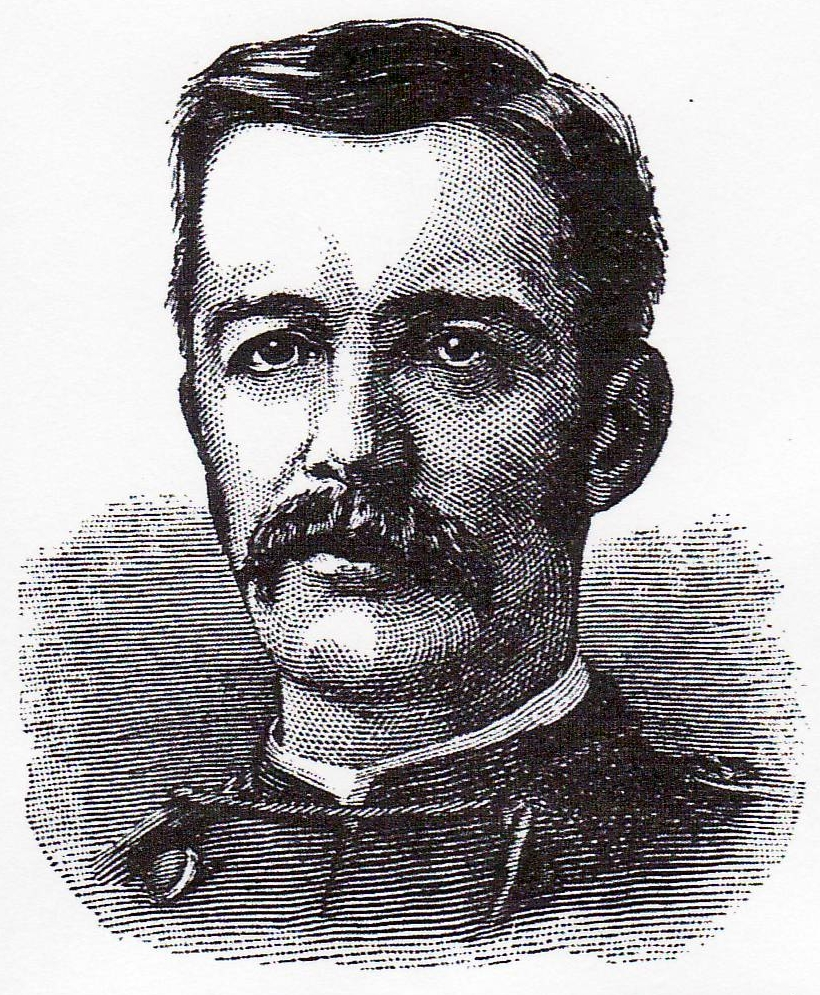
- Born: February 16, 1846; Winchester, New Hampshire, United States
- Died: February 7, 1901 (aged 54); Rustplaats, South Africa
- Burial place: Wakkerstroom, South Africa
- Military career
- Allegiance: United States; Canada
- Branch: United States Army; Canadian Militia
- Service years: 1867–1871; 1884–1885; 1900–1901
- Rank: Major
- Nickname: Gat
- Units: 1st U.S. Cavalry; Connecticut National Guard; 1st Canadian Mounted Rifles
- Commands: Canadian Scouts
- Conflicts: American Indian Wars; North-West Rebellion; Battle of Batoche; Second Boer War; Battle of Diamond Hill; Battle of Doornkop; Battle of Leliefontein
- Awards: Distinguished Service Order

Arthur L. "Gat" Howard DSO (February 16, 1846 – February 7, 1901), was an American and Canadian expert in the use of the early machine gun. He is best known for his use of a Gatling gun in support of the Canadian militia in the North-West Rebellion of 1885.

== Life ==
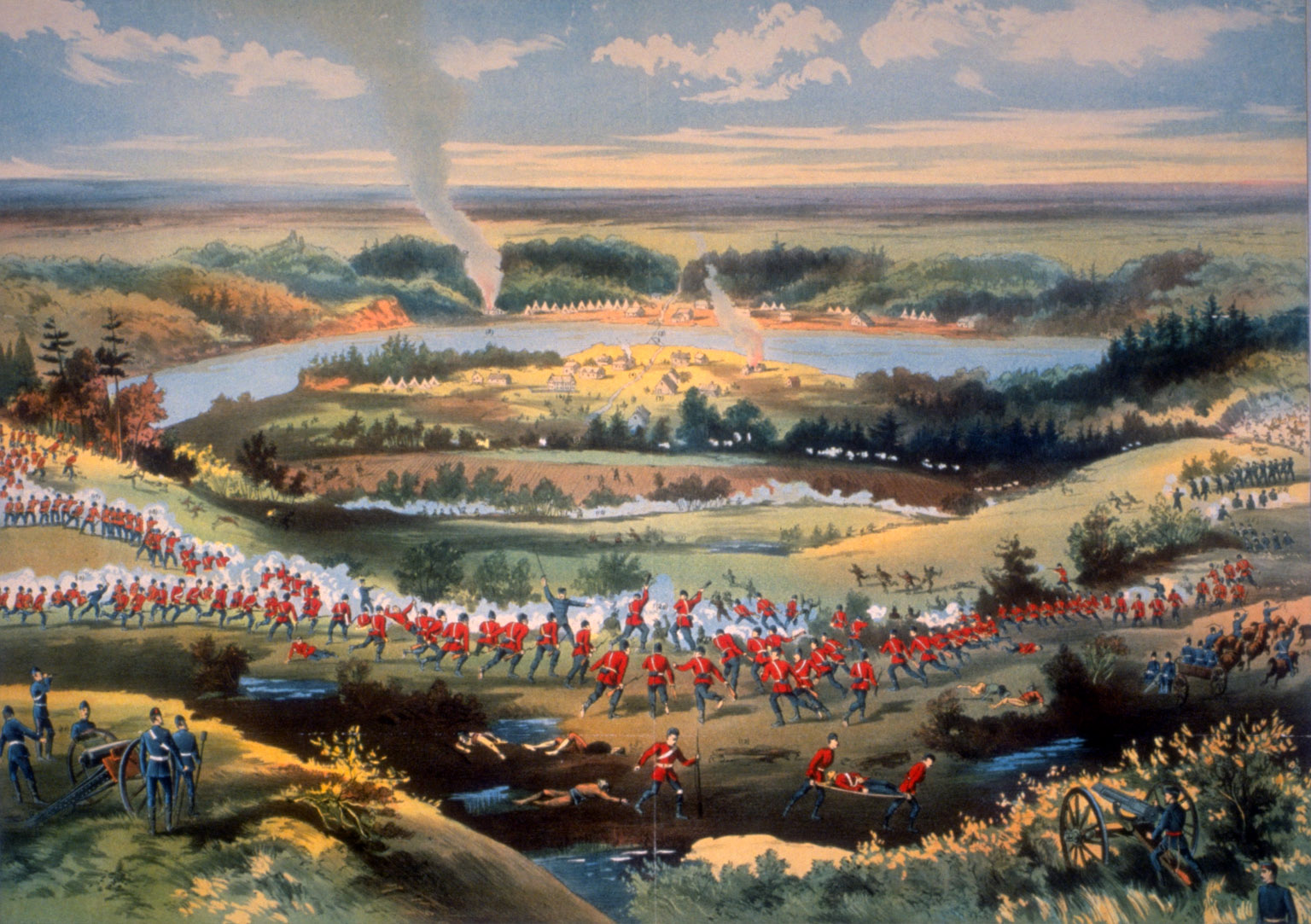
Howard's Gatling is at bottom right of the lithograph of the Battle of Batoche

Howard served for five years in the regular United States Cavalry. After leaving the regular army, he lived in New Haven, Connecticut, where he was employed by Winchester Arms. Howard then formed a cartridge-making firm of his own called A.L. Howard & Co., but his business premises were destroyed by fire in 1883. On July 18, 1884, Howard was placed in command of the Machine Gun Platoon, Connecticut National Guard, with the rank of Second Lieutenant.

When the North-West Rebellion of Métis and Indians broke out in western Canada, in March 1885, the Canadian militia commander, Major General Frederick Middleton, suggested that two Gatling guns be procured from the United States. Dr. Richard J. Gatling, the gun's inventor, began searching for a man who was an expert in the use of the Gatling, and selected Lieutenant Howard. Howard agreed to go to Canada with the two Gatlings. He was granted a month's leave of absence from the Guard (later extended). The Connecticut Guard later made it plain that they had "no hand" in Howard's planned expedition.

Howard left his wife and four children and a comfortable middle class life to travel to the North-West Territories with the Gatlings. His fascination with the Gatling gun, and scientific determination to test it under arduous battle conditions seem to have motivated his undertaking a dangerous mission which completely lacked U.S. government sanction – although this did not deter him from wearing his blue American officer's uniform in Canada, even on the battlefield. Howard's unofficial status was made even plainer when Dr. Gatling said that the lieutenant was not working for the Gatling manufacturer. He was travelling to Canada, Dr. Gatling said, merely as "a friend of the gun."

Howard journeyed, partly by rail, partly overland, to Swift Current, North-West Territories. There he gave a demonstration of the weapon to some fascinated Canadian militiamen and Mounted Police, one of whom wrote:

"These curious instruments of destruction we inspect with interest, and their trial is watched eagerly. A few rounds are fired at some duck on a distant pond – no execution is done apparently, but the rapidity of fire shows us how very deadly a weapon of this kind might be on proper occasions. We want now to see one tried on the Indians..."

One of the Gatlings was used at the Battle of Cut Knife on May 2, 1885. However eyewitness accounts make it clear that Howard was not present; rather, the gun was operated by Canadian gunners.

Howard himself and one Gatling embarked on the South Saskatchewan River aboard the steamboat Northcote, by which he travelled to Fish Creek, arriving on May 5, 1885. There he formed part of a Canadian militia column, which then moved on Louis Riel's capital at Batoche. On May 9, 1885, the first day of the Battle of Batoche, Howard fired some of the first shots from the militia side, aiming some rounds at the Roman Catholic rectory (the bullet holes may still be seen). He distinguished himself in action later that day, when his prompt and courageous actions prevented a group of the Métis from capturing one or more Canadian field guns. He was shifted that day from place to place so that the Gatling's firepower could be used to beat off significant enemy attacks. On May 12, 1885, the final day of the battle, Howard and his Gatling were again in the thick of the fighting, being brought up to defeat the last resistance near the village of Batoche. After the militia victory, Howard stayed in Canada, and became a wealthy cartridge manufacturer.

On the outbreak of the Second Boer War, he became a machine-gun officer in the Canadian Mounted Rifles. He then organized a unit called the Canadian Scouts, with the rank of major. Arthur Howard was killed in action at Rustplaats on February 17, 1901. Major Howard's grave is in Wakkerstroom, Mpumalanga, South Africa. He was posthumously mentioned in despatches for "acts of gallantry" and awarded the Distinguished Service Order.

Howard was given the nickname "Gat" by the Canadian popular press during the campaign of 1885.
