= Hastings and Prince Edward Regiment Museum =

- Location: Belleville Armoury, 187 Pinnacle Street, Belleville, Ontario, Canada
- Coordinates: 44.16353°N 77.38193°W
- Type: Regimental museum

The Hastings and Prince Edward Regiment Museum is located at the Belleville Armoury in Belleville, Ontario. The museum preserves the history of the militia, specifically the Hastings and Prince Edward Regiment, through the collection and preservation of military artifacts and documents of historical significance to the Regiment and its antecedent units.

The museum displays and illustrates in an appropriate manner the dress, weapons, military equipment, and customs of the Regiment’s heritage. It serves as a training medium to teach regimental history and to provide a scholarly basis for those studying the history of the militia, the Regiment and its antecedent units, and their historical significance in the Midland District of Ontario. The museum fosters in the local community interest and a sense of pride in the Regiment and its accomplishments.

The museum focuses on the history of the Regiment, its activities in different wars, and the effect on area counties. Exhibits include uniforms, weapons, medals, equipment, photographs, and other military and regimental memorabilia. The museum is open several days a week.

The museum is affiliated with: CMA, CHIN, OMMC, and Virtual Museum of Canada.
