= 80th Battalion, CEF =

Canadian infantry battalion

The 80th Battalion, CEF was an infantry battalion of the Canadian Expeditionary Force during the Great War. The 80th Battalion was authorized on 10 July 1915 and embarked for Great Britain on 20 May 1916. It provided reinforcements to the Canadian Corps in the field until 30 September 1916, when its personnel were absorbed by units of the 4th Canadian Division. The battalion was subsequently disbanded on 17 July 1917.

The 80th Battalion recruited throughout Eastern Ontario and was mobilized at Barriefield (now CFB Kingston), Ontario.

The 80th Battalion was commanded by Lt.-Col. W.G. Ketcheson from 22 May 1916 to 25 September 1916.

The 80th Battalion was awarded the battle honour The Great War 1916.

The 80th Battalion, CEF is perpetuated by The Hastings and Prince Edward Regiment.
