= Iwuy =

- Commune
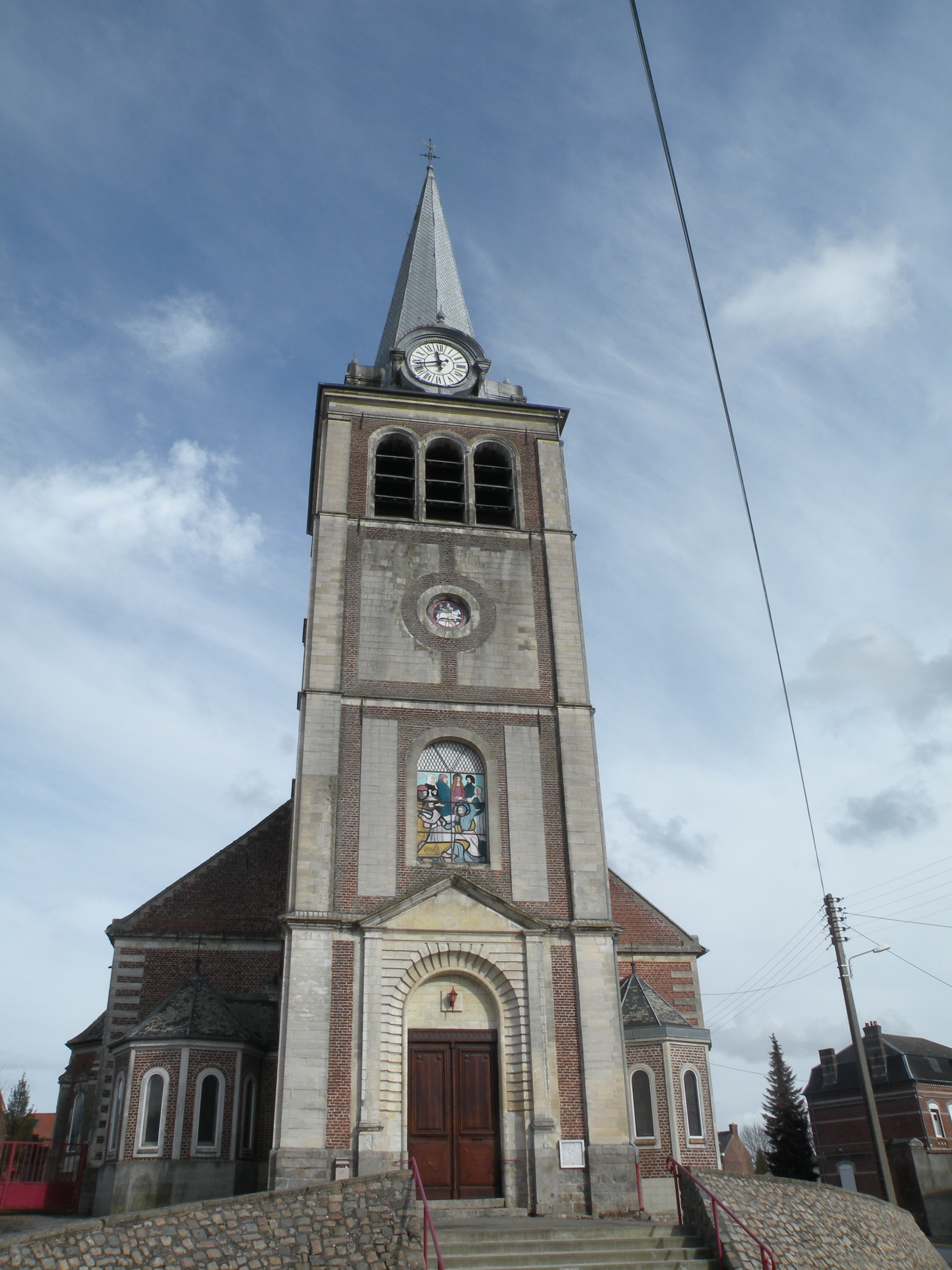
- Eglise Saint-Vaast d'Iwuy, the church in Iwuy

- Coat of arms
- Location of Iwuy
- Location within France Location within Hauts-de-France
- Coordinates: 50°14′00″N 3°19′23″E
- Country: France
- Region: Hauts-de-France
- Department: Nord
- Arrondissement: Cambrai
- Canton: Caudry
- Intercommunality: CA Cambrai

Government
  - Mayor (2020–2026): Daniel Poteau
- Area^{1}: 12.75 km^{2} (4.92 sq mi)
- Elevation: 52 m (171 ft)
- Highest elevation: 81 m (266 ft)
- Lowest elevation: 35 m (115 ft)
- Population (2023): 3,403
  - Density: 266.9/km^{2} (691.3/sq mi)
- Time zone: UTC+01:00 (CET)
  - Summer (DST): UTC+02:00 (CEST)
- INSEE/Postal code: 59322 /59141
- ^{1} French Land Register data, which excludes lakes, ponds, glaciers > 1 km^{2} (0.386 sq mi or 247 acres) and river estuaries.

Iwuy (French pronunciation: [ivɥi]) is a commune in the Nord department in northern France.

== Population ==
Historical population
Year	Pop.	±% p.a.
1968	3,573	—
1975	3,572	−0.00%
1982	3,509	−0.25%
1990	3,418	−0.33%
1999	3,306	−0.37%
2007	3,143	−0.63%
2012	3,232	+0.56%
2017	3,348	+0.71%
2023	3,403	+0.27%
Source: INSEE

== Heraldry ==
Arms of Iwuy	The arms of Iwuy are blazoned : Argent, a cross engrailed sable, overall in chief a label of 5 points gules.

== See also ==
- Communes of the Nord department
