= Midland Provisional Battalion =

- Active: 1885
- Disbanded: 1885
- Country: Canada
- Branch: Canadian Militia
- Type: Provisional battalion
- Role: Infantry
- Size: 8 companies
- Part of: Non-Permanent Active Militia; North West Field Force
- Engagements: North-West Rebellion
- Battle honours: North West Canada, 1885

The Midland Provisional Battalion (also known as The Midland Battalion) was a military unit of the Non-Permanent Active Militia of the Canadian Militia (now the Canadian Army) from Eastern Ontario, Canada, which fought in the North-West Rebellion of 1885. Placed under the command of Lieutenant-Colonel A.T.H. Williams of the 46th East Durham Battalion, the battalion consisted of around 370 officers and men by grouping together 8 companies from 7 different Canadian Militia infantry battalions from Eastern Ontario and served during the conflict in General Middleton’s Column of the North West Field Force. The battalion most notably served at the Battle of Batoche, where fighting alongside the 10th Royal Grenadiers and with support from the 90th Winnipeg Rifles, the battalion charged and captured the Métis rifle pits. After the end of the rebellion, the battalion was disbanded in the same year.

== Organization ==
The Midland Provisional Battalion consisted of eight companies mobilized from different Ontario militia battalions:

- A Company (from the 15th Battalion, Argyll Light Infantry – Belleville)
- B Company (from the 40th Northumberland Battalion – Cobourg)
- C Company (from the 45th West Durham Battalion – Lindsay)
- D Company (from the 46th East Durham Battalion – Port Hope)
- E Company (from the 46th East Durham Battalion – Port Hope)
- F Company (from the 47th Frontenac Battalion – Portsmouth)
- G Company (from the 57th Battalion, Peterborough Rangers – Peterborough)
- H Company (from the 49th Battalion Hastings Rifles – Hastings County (Belleville))

== Notable members ==
- Lt.-Colonel Arthur Trefusis Heneage Williams
