= 155th (Quinte) Battalion, CEF =

The 155th (Quinte) Battalion, CEF was a unit in the Canadian Expeditionary Force during the First World War. Based in Barriefield, Ontario, the unit began recruiting in late 1915 in Hastings and Prince Edward Counties. After sailing to England in October 1916, the battalion was absorbed into the 154th Battalion, CEF and 6th Reserve Battalion on December 8, 1916. The 155th (Quinte) Battalion, CEF had one Officer Commanding: Lieut-Col. M. K. Adams.

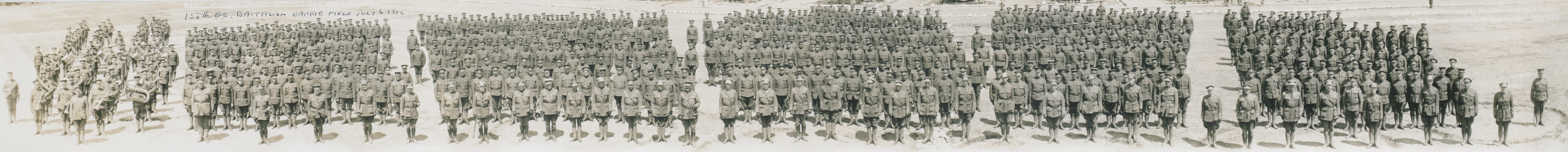
