= 136th (Durham) Battalion, CEF =

The 136th (Durham) Battalion, CEF was a unit in the Canadian Expeditionary Force during the First World War. Based in Kingston, Ontario, the unit began recruiting in late 1915 in Durham County, Ontario and Pontiac County, Quebec. After sailing to England in October 1916, the battalion was absorbed into the 39th Battalion, CEF and 6th Reserve Battalion on October 6, 1916. The 136th (Durham) Battalion, CEF had one Officer Commanding: Lieut-Col. R. W. Smart.

The battalion is perpetuated by The Hastings and Prince Edward Regiment.
