= 254th Battalion (Quinte's Own), CEF =

The 254th (Quinte's Own) Battalion, CEF was a unit in the Canadian Expeditionary Force during the First World War. Based in Belleville, Ontario, the unit began recruiting in the autumn of 1916 in Hastings County. After sailing to England in June 1917, the battalion was absorbed into the 6th Reserve Battalion, CEF upon arrival. The 254th (Quinte's Own) Battalion, CEF had one Officer Commanding: Lieut-Col. A. P. Allan.

Stated place-of-birth of those who embarked for overseas with the battalion: B.W.I.: 1; Canada: 209; England: 26; France: 1; Ireland: 1; Scotland: 7; Chile: 1; Switzerland: 1; U.S.A.: 12; not stated: 1.
