= 139th (Northumberland) Battalion, CEF =

The 139th (Northumberland) Battalion, CEF was a unit in the Canadian Expeditionary Force during the First World War. Based in Cobourg, Ontario, the unit began recruiting in late 1915 in Northumberland County. After sailing to England in September 1916, the battalion was absorbed into the 3rd and 36th Reserve Battalions on October 6, 1916. The 139th Battalion, CEF had one Officer Commanding: Lieut-Col. W. H. Floyd.
