= Le Musée de Saint-Boniface Museum =

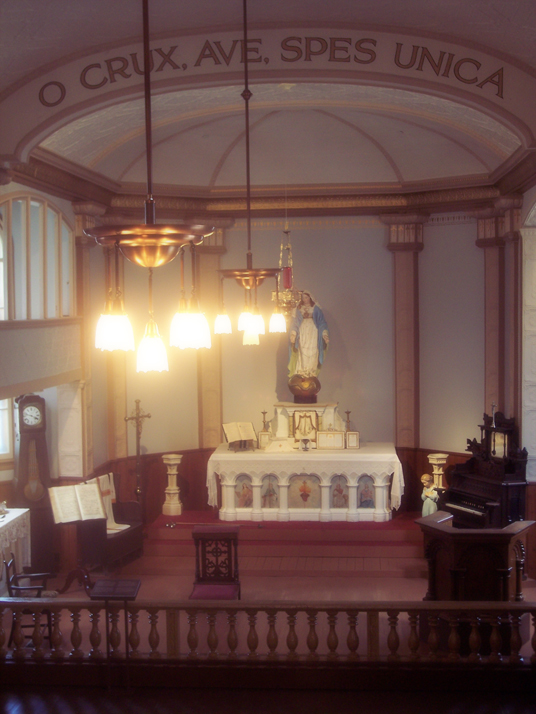
- Established: 1959; 67 years ago
- Location: 494 Taché Ave; Winnipeg, Manitoba, Canada; R2H 2B2
- Coordinates: 49°53′16″N 97°07′23″W
- Type: Civic museum
- Director: Cindy desrochers
- Public transit access: Winnipeg Transit; D16 110
- Website: www.msbm.mb.ca/english/profile.html

National Historic Site of Canada
- Official name: Grey Nuns' Convent National Historic Site of Canada
- Designated: 1958

Municipally Designated Site
- Official name: Grey Nuns' Convent
- Designation: Winnipeg Landmark Heritage Structure
- Recognized: February 28, 1995
- CRHP listing: January 24, 2008
- Recognition authority: City of Winnipeg
- ID: 8607

Le Musée de Saint-Boniface Museum (also known as the St. Boniface Museum) is a museum in Winnipeg, Manitoba, Canada, that is dedicated to Franco-Manitoban and Métis culture and history.

It is located in the second oldest building in Winnipeg, after the store built in 1831 at the Seven Oaks House Museum. It is a former convent of the Grey Nuns. Begun in 1846 and finished in 1851, the former nunnery has been an orphanage, a school, a seniors' home, and was the first incarnation of the St. Boniface Hospital.

The Museum is affiliated with CMA, CHIN, and Virtual Museum of Canada.

== History ==
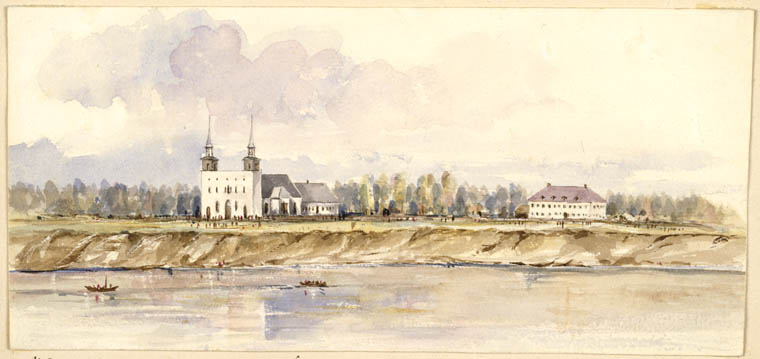
Saint Boniface Cathedral and the Grey Nuns' Convent in 1858

The first Grey Nuns who lived in this house arrived in 1844, and lived with Bishop Norbert Provencher until the house had been started. The four women moved into the house in December 1846, at which time only the exterior of the first floor and the floor of the second floor above the kitchen had been completed. Due to the extreme temperatures of the region, it was necessary to somehow insulate the room. The nuns used bison pelts hung from the ceiling to do this.

When the building was finished, there was a basement, two floors and an attic. The building was built using the Red River construction method (also called mortise and tenon or tongue and groove). The building uses no nails to hold it together.

In November 1959 the municipality designated a museum for the site and established a board of directors. Since the late 1960s, the nunnery has been administered by first, the city of Saint-Boniface, then the City of Winnipeg after the amalgamation of 1971.

The convent building was designated a National Historic Site of Canada in 1958.

The museum has a permanent exhibit dedicated to Louis Riel. On display are locks of his hair, his revolver, his shaving kit, his moccasins and other items belonging to him plus pieces of the rope used to hang Riel, the white hood placed on him before he was hanged, and the coffin on which his body was placed after his execution.
