= 39th Battalion, CEF =

Canadian infantry battalion

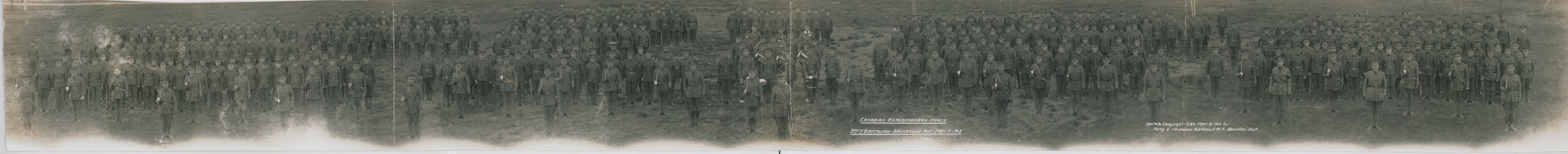
39th Battalion, Belleville, Ontario (HS85-10-30562)

The 39th Battalion, CEF, was an infantry battalion of the Canadian Expeditionary Force during the Great War.

== History ==
The 39th Battalion was authorized on 7 November 1914 and embarked for Great Britain on 17 June 1915. It provided reinforcements to the Canadian Corps in the field until 4 January 1917, when its personnel were absorbed by the 6th Reserve Battalion, CEF. The battalion was subsequently disbanded on 17 July 1917.

The 39th Battalion recruited in Eastern Ontario was mobilized at Belleville, Ontario.

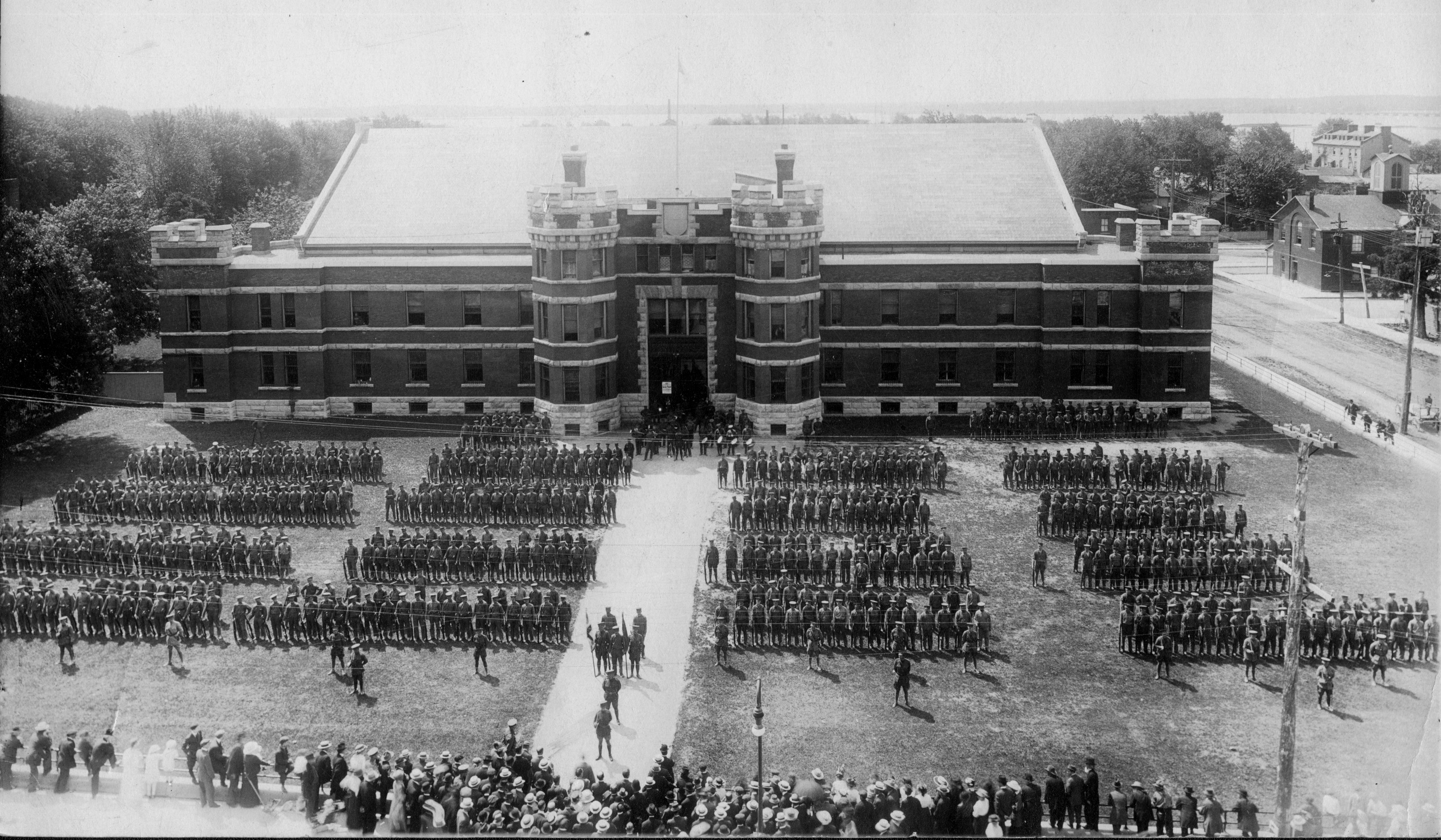
1915 (probably June 23) 39th Battalion of the Canadian Expeditionary Force on the parade grounds of the Belleville, Ontario, armoury building... ready to leave for overseas, WWI

The 39th battalion had one Officer Commanding, Lt-Col. A.V. Preston from 24 June 1915 to 4 January 1917.

The 39th Battalion was awarded the battle honour THE GREAT WAR 1915–17.

== Perpetuation ==
The 39th Battalion CEF is perpetuated by The Hastings and Prince Edward Regiment.

== See also ==
- List of infantry battalions in the Canadian Expeditionary Force

== Sources ==
- Canadian Expeditionary Force 1914–1919 by Col. G.W.L. Nicholson, CD, Queen's Printer, Ottawa, Ontario, 1962
