= Grain elevator =

Grain storage building

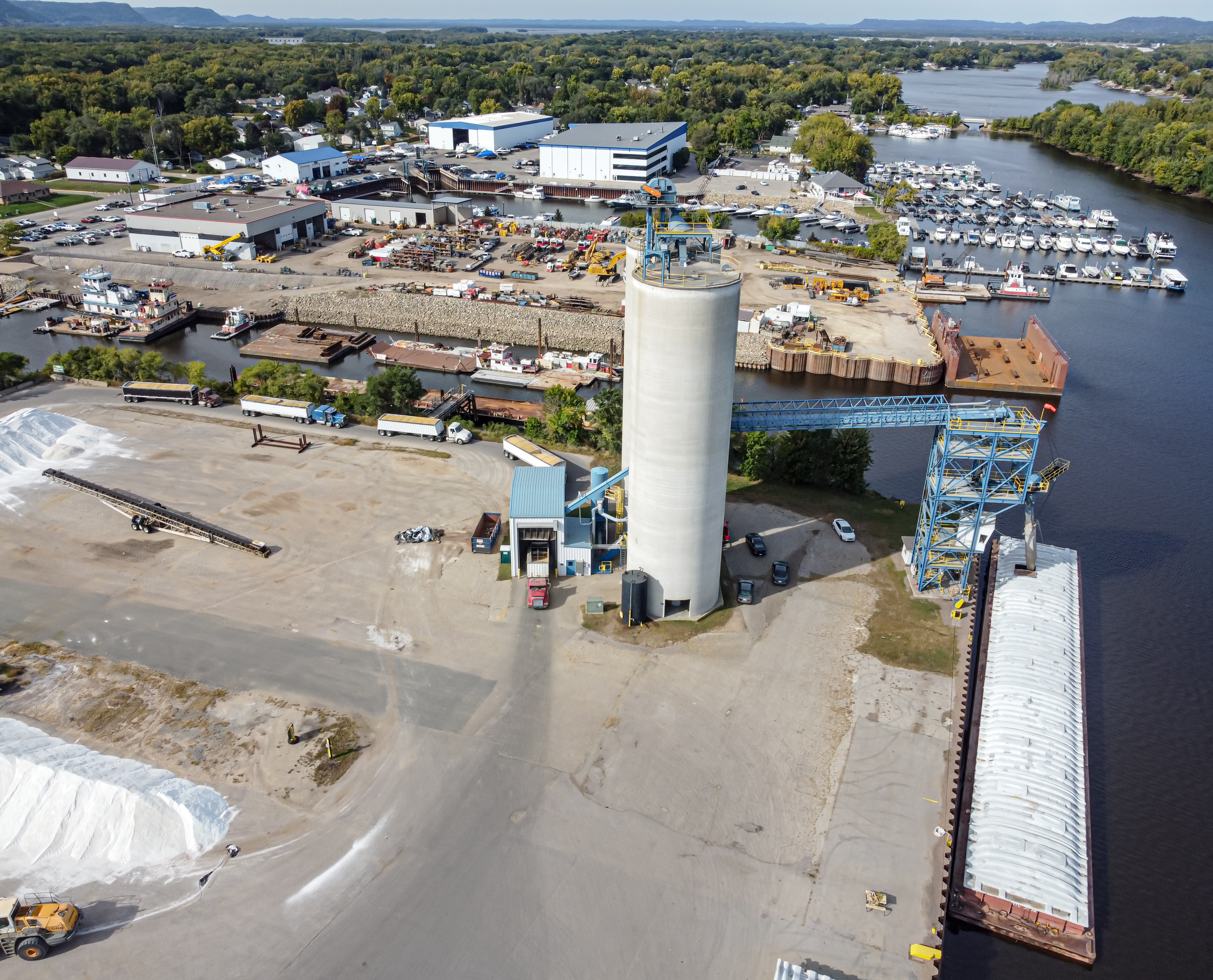
- Grain hopper trailers lined up to unload at the Cargill grain elevator in La Crosse for barges (Click for aerial video)

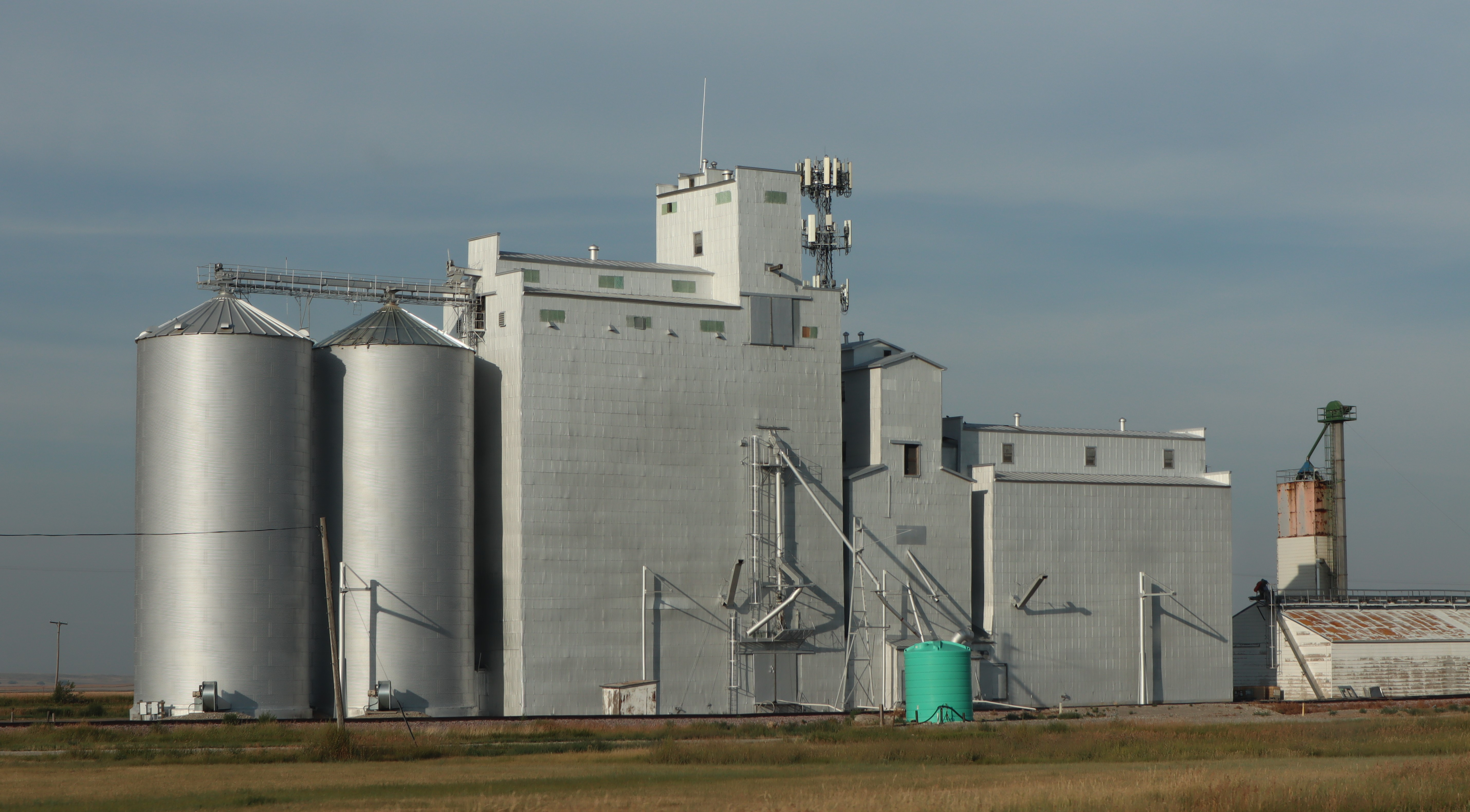
Railroad grain elevator in Valier, Montana

A grain elevator or grain terminal is a facility designed to stockpile or store grain. In the grain trade, the term "grain elevator" also describes a tower containing a bucket elevator or a pneumatic conveyor, which scoops up grain from a lower level and deposits it in a silo or other storage facility.

In most cases, the term "grain elevator" also describes the entire elevator complex, including receiving and testing offices, weighbridges, and storage facilities. It may also mean organizations that operate or control several individual elevators, in different locations. In Australia, the term describes only the lifting mechanism.

Before the advent of the grain elevator, grain was usually handled in bags rather than in bulk (large quantities of loose grain). The Dart elevator was a major innovation—it was invented by Joseph Dart, a merchant, and Robert Dunbar, an engineer, in 1842, in Buffalo, New York. Using the steam-powered flour mills of Oliver Evans as their model, they invented the marine leg, which scooped loose grain out of the hulls of ships and elevated it to the top of a marine tower.

Early grain elevators and bins were often built of framed or cribbed wood, and were prone to fire. In 1899 Frank H. Peavey "The Elevator King' along with Charles F. Haglin, invented the modern grain elevator. The first Peavey-Haglin Experimental Concrete Grain Elevator still stands today in St. Louis Park, Minnesota. The Peavey invented elevator was the first cylindrical concrete grain elevator in the world and is now widely used across Canada and the US.

Grain elevator bins, tanks, and silos are now usually made of steel or reinforced concrete. Bucket elevators are used to lift grain to a distributor or consignor, from which it falls through spouts and/or conveyors and into one or more bins, silos, or tanks in a facility. When desired, silos, bins, and tanks are emptied by gravity flow, sweep augers, and conveyors. As grain is emptied from bins, tanks, and silos, it is conveyed, blended, and weighted into trucks, railroad cars, or barges for shipment.

== Usage and definitions ==
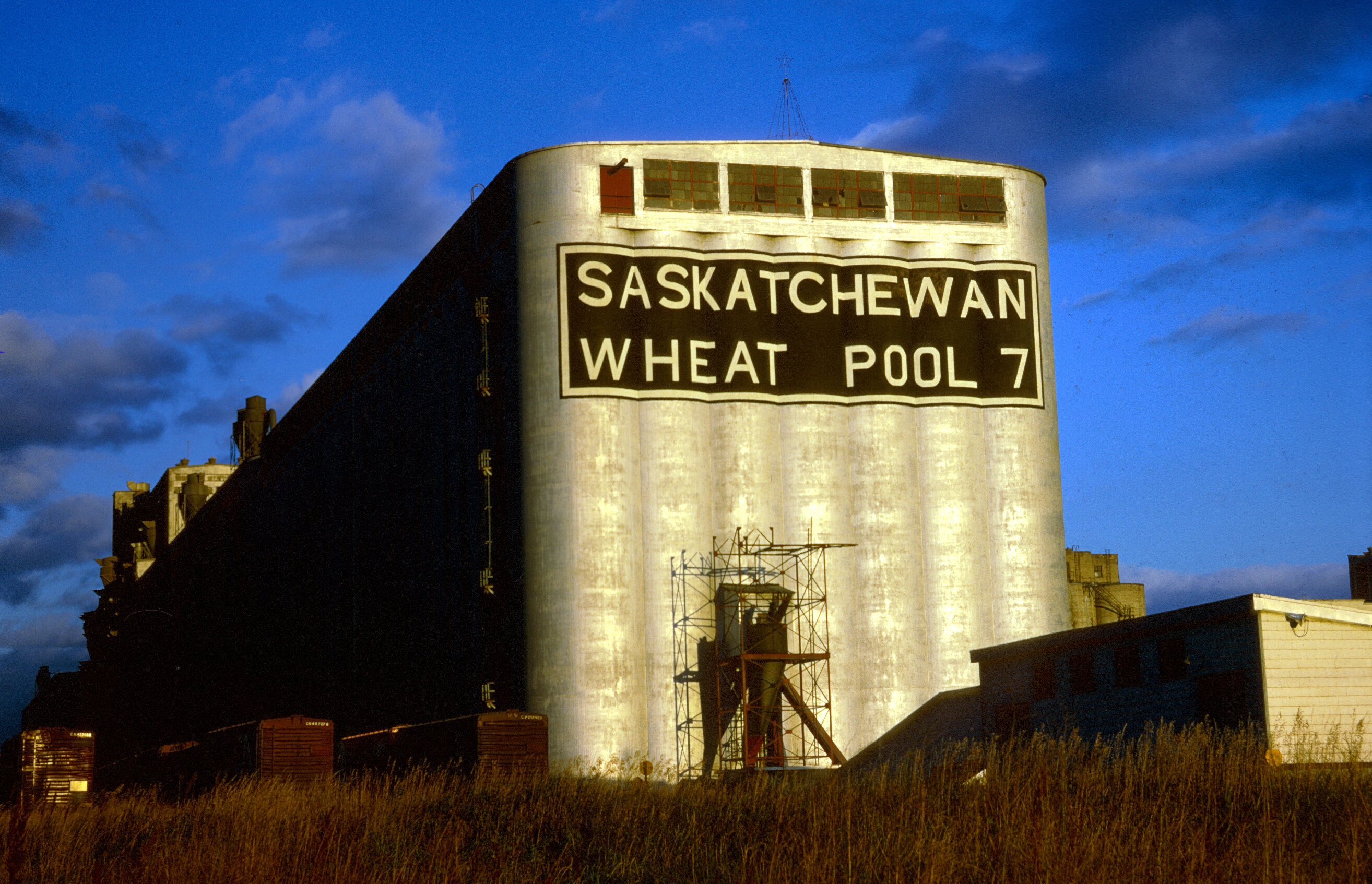
Saskatchewan Wheat Pool No. 7, Thunder Bay, Ontario

In Australian English, the term "grain elevator" is reserved for elevator towers, while a receival and storage building or complex is distinguished by the formal term "receival point" or as a "wheat bin" or "silo". Large-scale grain receival, storage, and logistics operations are known in Australia as bulk handling.

In Canada, the term "grain elevator" is used to refer to a place where farmers sell grain into the global grain distribution system, and/or a place where the grain is moved into rail cars or ocean-going ships for transport. Specifically, several types of grain elevators are defined under Canadian law, in the Canadian Grain Act, section 2.

- Primary elevators (called "country elevators" before 1971) receive grain directly from producers for storage, forwarding, or both.
- Process elevators (called "mill elevators" before 1971) receive and store grain for direct manufacture or processing into other products.
- Terminal elevators receive grain on or after official inspection and weighing and clean, store, and treat grain before moving it forward.
- Transfer elevators (including "Eastern elevators" from the pre-1971 classification) transfer grain that has been officially inspected and weighed at another elevator. In the Eastern Division, transfer elevators also receive, clean, and store eastern or foreign grain.

== History ==
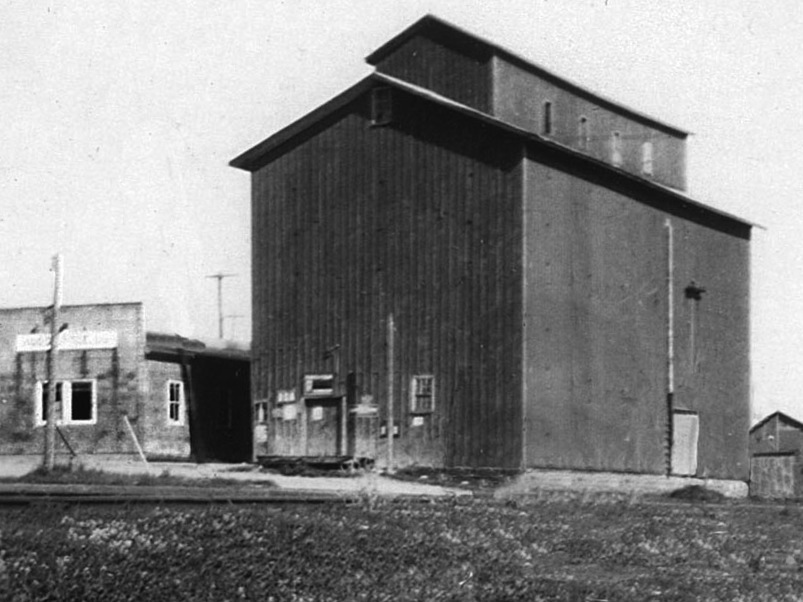
The Port Perry mill and grain elevator, circa 1930: Built in 1873, it is the oldest grain elevator in Canada and remains a major landmark to this day. The line of the PW&PP Railway can be seen in the foreground.

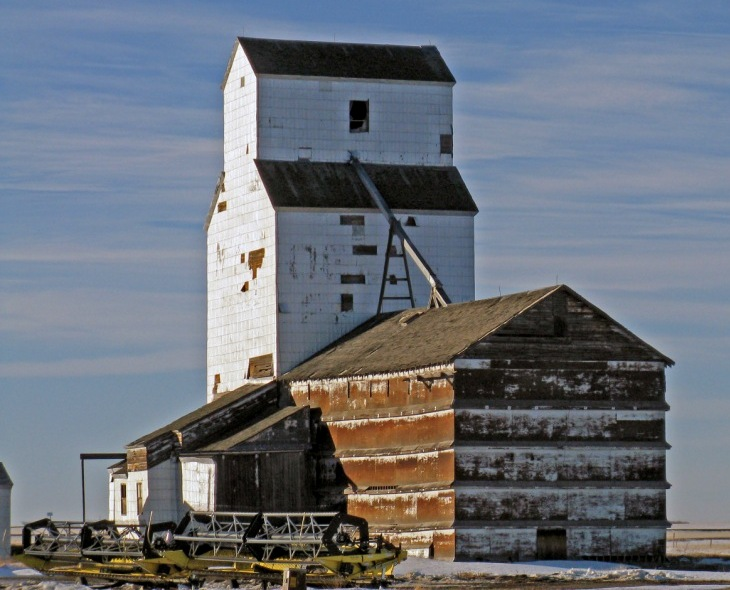
Typical "wood-cribbed" design for grain elevators throughout Western Canada, a common design used from the early 1900s to mid-1980s: The former Ogilvie Flour Mill elevator in Wrentham, Alberta, was built in 1925.

Both necessity and the prospect of making money gave birth to the steam-powered grain elevator in Buffalo, New York, in 1843. Due to the completion of the Erie Canal in 1825, Buffalo enjoyed a unique position in American geography. It stood at the intersection of two great all-water routes; one extended from New York Harbor, up the Hudson River to Albany, and beyond it, the Port of Buffalo; the other comprised the Great Lakes, which could theoretically take boaters in any direction they wished to go (north to Canada, west to Michigan or Wisconsin, south to Toledo and Cleveland, or east to the Atlantic Ocean). All through the 1830s, Buffalo benefited tremendously from its position. In particular, it was the recipient of most of the increasing quantities of grain (mostly wheat) that was being grown on farms in Ohio and Indiana, and shipped on Lake Erie for trans-shipment to the Erie Canal. If Buffalo had not been there, or when things got backed up there, that grain would have been loaded onto boats at Cincinnati and shipped down the Mississippi River to New Orleans.

By 1842, Buffalo's port facilities clearly had become antiquated. They still relied upon techniques that had been in use since the European Middle Ages; work teams of stevedores use block and tackles and their own backs to unload or load each sack of grain that had been stored ashore or in the boat's hull. Several days, sometimes even a week, were needed to serve a single grain-laden boat. Grain shipments were going down the Mississippi River, not over the Great Lakes/Erie Canal system.

A merchant named Joseph Dart Jr., is generally credited as being the one who adapted Oliver Evans' grain elevator (originally a manufacturing device) for use in a commercial framework (the trans-shipment of grain in bulk from lakers to canal boats), but the actual design and construction of the world's first steam-powered "grain storage and transfer warehouse" was executed by an engineer named Robert Dunbar. Thanks to the historic Dart's Elevator (operational on 1 June 1843), which worked almost seven times faster than its nonmechanized predecessors, Buffalo was able to keep pace with—and thus further stimulate—the rapid growth of American agricultural production in the 1840s and 1850s, but especially after the Civil War, with the coming of the railroads.

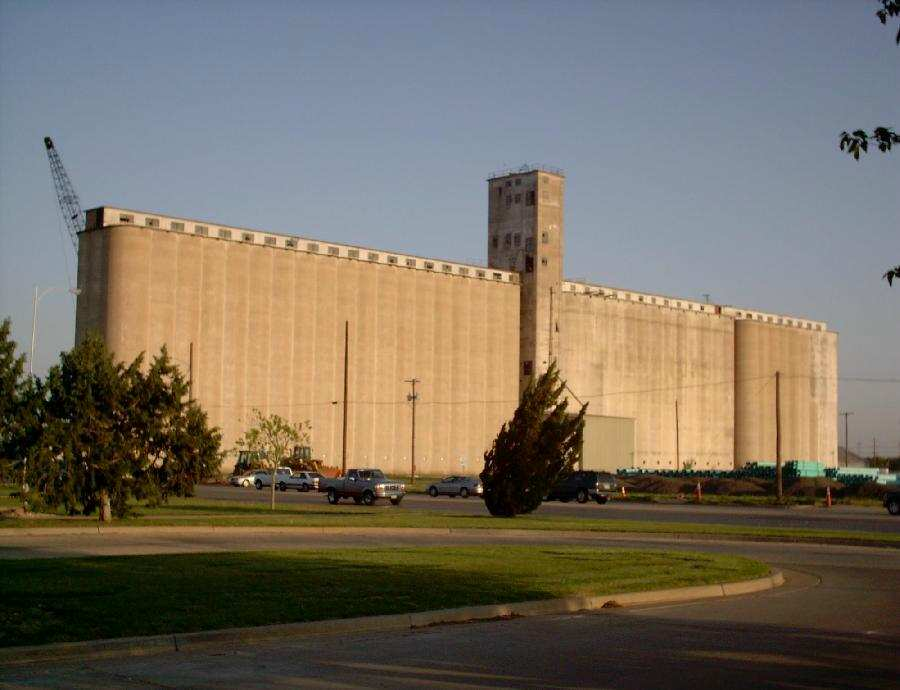
A 1928 Burrus Elevator steel-reinforced concrete elevator with 123 silos shown just prior to demolition in 2004

The world's second and third grain elevators were built in Toledo, Ohio, and Brooklyn, New York, in 1847. These fledgling American cities were connected through an emerging international grain trade of unprecedented proportions. Grain shipments from farms in Ohio were loaded onto ships by elevators at Toledo; these ships were unloaded by elevators at Buffalo that shipped their grain to canal boats (and, later, rail cars), which were unloaded by elevators in Brooklyn, where the grain was either distributed to East Coast flour mills or loaded for further shipment to England, the Netherlands, or Germany. This eastern flow of grain, though, was matched by an equally important flow of people and capital in the opposite direction, that is, from east to west. Because of the money to be made in grain production, and of course, because of the existence of an all-water route to get there, increasing numbers of immigrants in Brooklyn came to Ohio, Indiana, and Illinois to become farmers. More farmers meant more prairies turned into farmlands, which in turn meant increased grain production, which of course meant that more grain elevators would have to be built in places such as Toledo, Buffalo, and Brooklyn (and Cleveland, Chicago, and Duluth). Through this loop of productivity set in motion by the invention of the grain elevator, the United States became a major international producer of wheat, corn, and oats.

In the early 20th century, concern arose about monopolistic practices in the grain elevator industry, leading to testimony before the Interstate Commerce Commission in 1906. This led to several grain elevators being burned down in Nebraska, allegedly in protest.

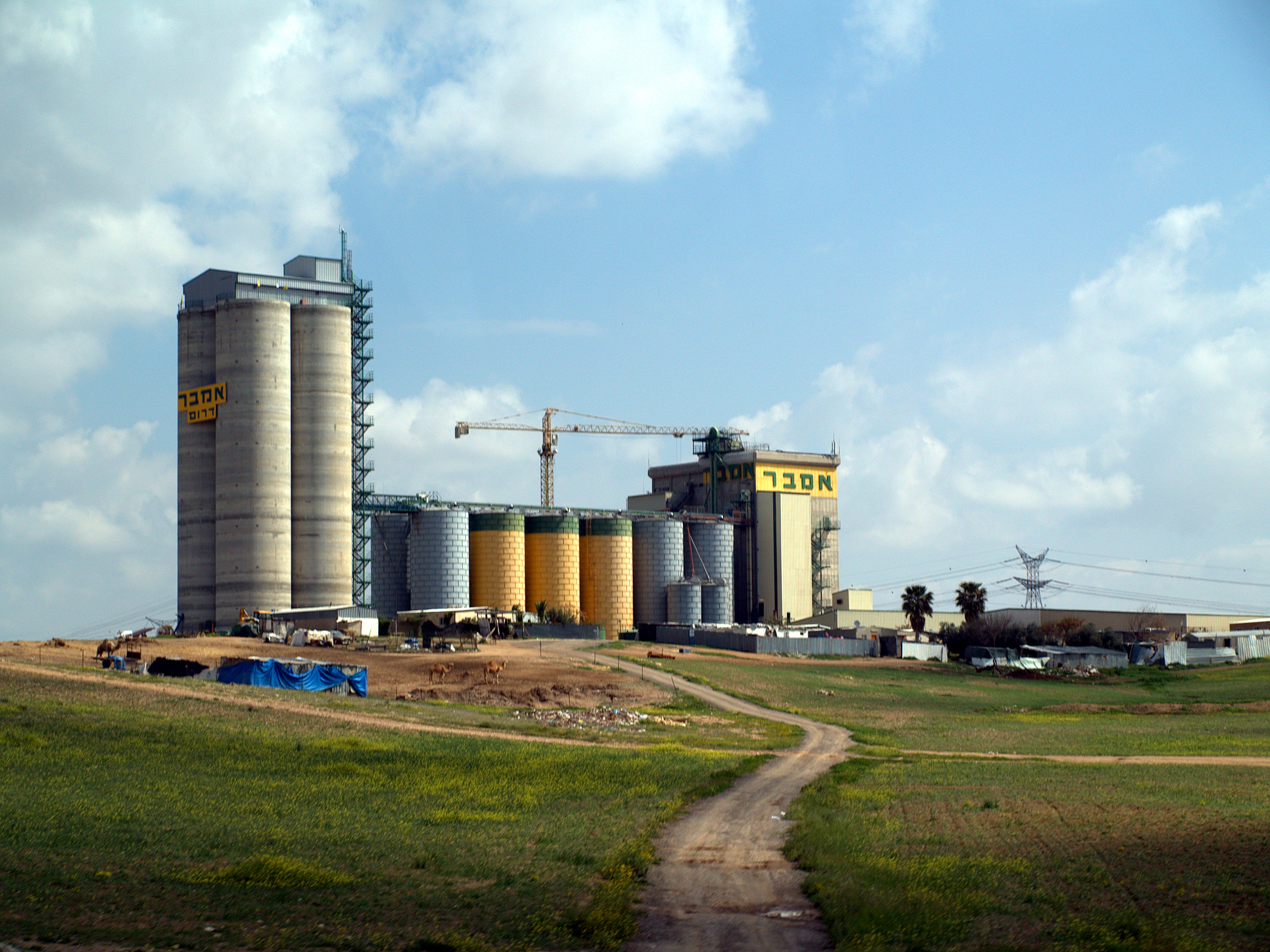
Silos connected to a grain elevator on a farm in Israel

Today, grain elevators are a common sight in the grain-growing areas of the world, such as the North American prairies. Larger terminal elevators are found at distribution centers, such as Chicago and Thunder Bay, Ontario, where grain is sent for processing, or loaded aboard trains or ships to go further afield.

Buffalo, New York, the world's largest grain port from the 1850s until the first half of the 20th century, once had the United States' largest capacity for the storage of grain in over 30 concrete grain elevators located along the inner and outer harbors. While several are still in productive use, many of those that remain are presently idle. In a nascent trend, some of the city's inactive capacity has recently come back online, with an ethanol plant started in 2007 using one of the previously mothballed elevators to store corn. In the early 20th century, Buffalo's grain elevators inspired modernist architects such as Le Corbusier, who exclaimed, "The first fruits of the new age!" when he first saw them. Buffalo's grain elevators have been documented for the Historic American Engineering Record and added to the National Register of Historic Places. Currently, Enid, Oklahoma, holds the title of most grain storage capacity in the United States.

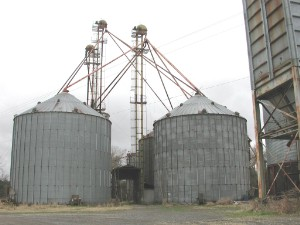
Corrugated-steel grain bins and cable-guyed grain elevator at a grain elevator in Hemingway, South Carolina

In farming communities, each town had one or more small grain elevators that served the local growers. The classic grain elevator was constructed with wooden cribbing and had nine or more larger square or rectangular bins arranged in 3 × 3 or 3 × 4 or 4 × 4 or more patterns. Wooden-cribbed elevators usually had a driveway with truck scale and office on one side, a rail line on the other side, and additional grain-storage annex bins on either side.

In more recent times with improved transportation, centralized and much larger elevators serve many farms. Some of them are quite large. Two elevators in Kansas (one in Hutchinson and one in Wichita) are half a mile long. The loss of the grain elevators from small towns is often considered a great change in their identity, and efforts to preserve them as heritage structures are made. At the same time, many larger grain farms have their own grain-handling facilities for storage and loading onto trucks.

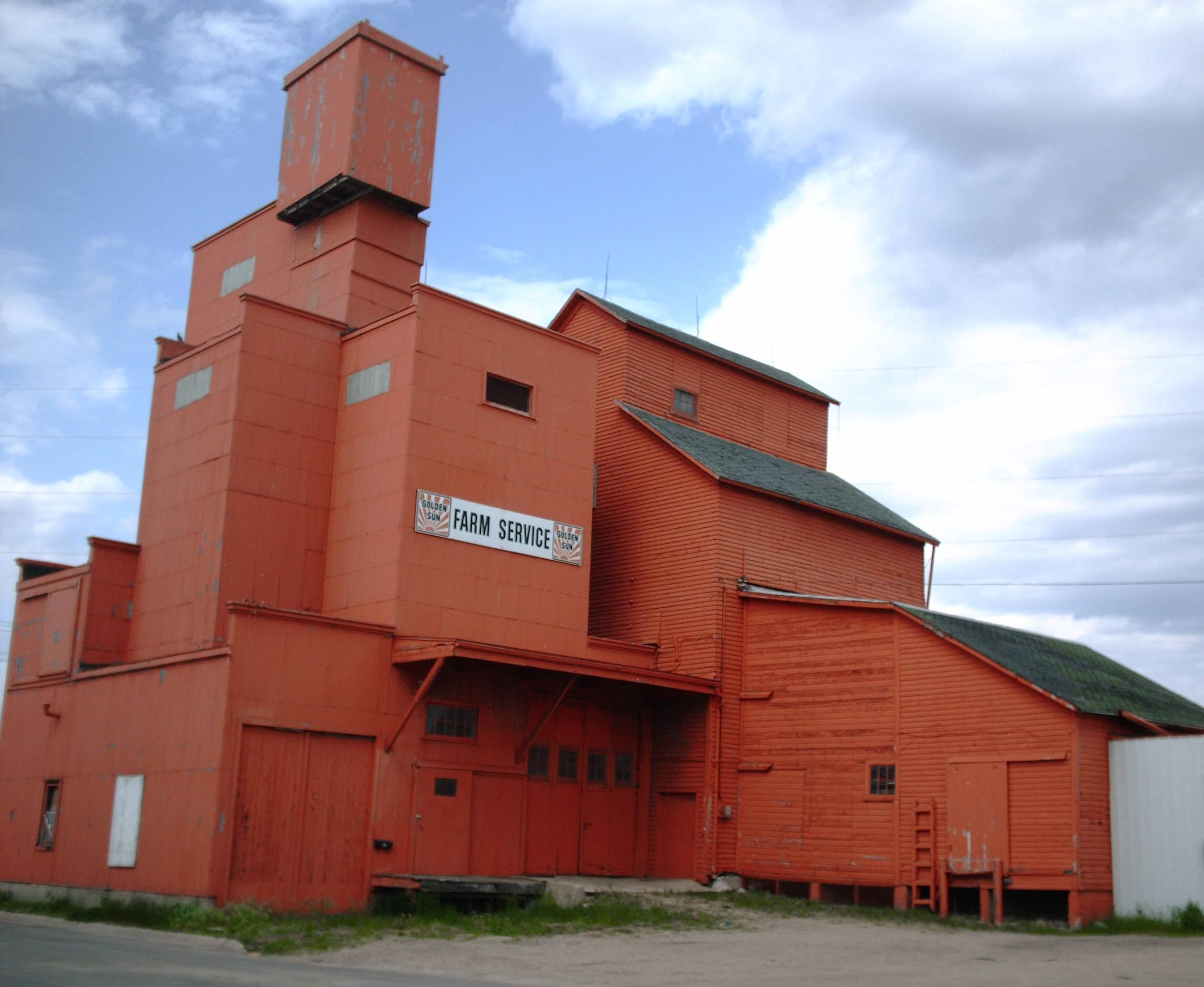
Old wooden cribbed grain elevator and livestock feedmill in Estherville, Iowa

Before economical truck transportation was available, grain elevator operators sometimes used their purchasing power to control prices. This was especially easy, since farmers often had only one elevator within a reasonable distance of their farms. This led some governments to take over the administration of grain elevators. An example of this is the Saskatchewan Wheat Pool. For the same reason, many elevators were purchased by cooperatives.

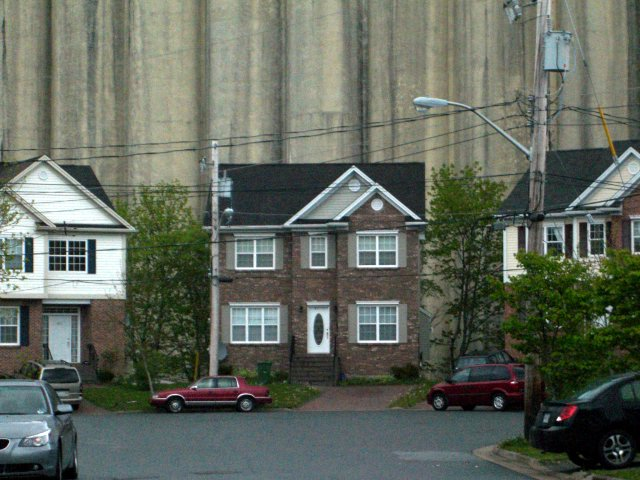
These houses in Halifax, Nova Scotia were constructed in the 1990s long after the elevator had been constructed and are vulnerable due to their location. In the summer of 2003, an explosion at this elevator sparked a fire that took seven hours to extinguish.

A recent problem with grain elevators is the need to provide separate storage for ordinary and genetically modified grain to reduce the risk of accidental mixing of the two.

Grain elevators sometimes experience silo explosions. Fine powder from the millions of grains passing through the facility would accumulate and mix with the oxygen in the air. A spark could spread from one floating particle to the other, creating a chain reaction that would destroy the entire structure. (This dispersed-fuel explosion is the mechanism behind fuel-air bombs.) To prevent this, elevators have very rigorous rules against smoking or any other open flame. Many elevators also have various devices installed to maximize ventilation, safeguards against overheating in belt conveyors, legs, bearings, and explosion-proof electrical devices such as electric motors, switches, and lighting.

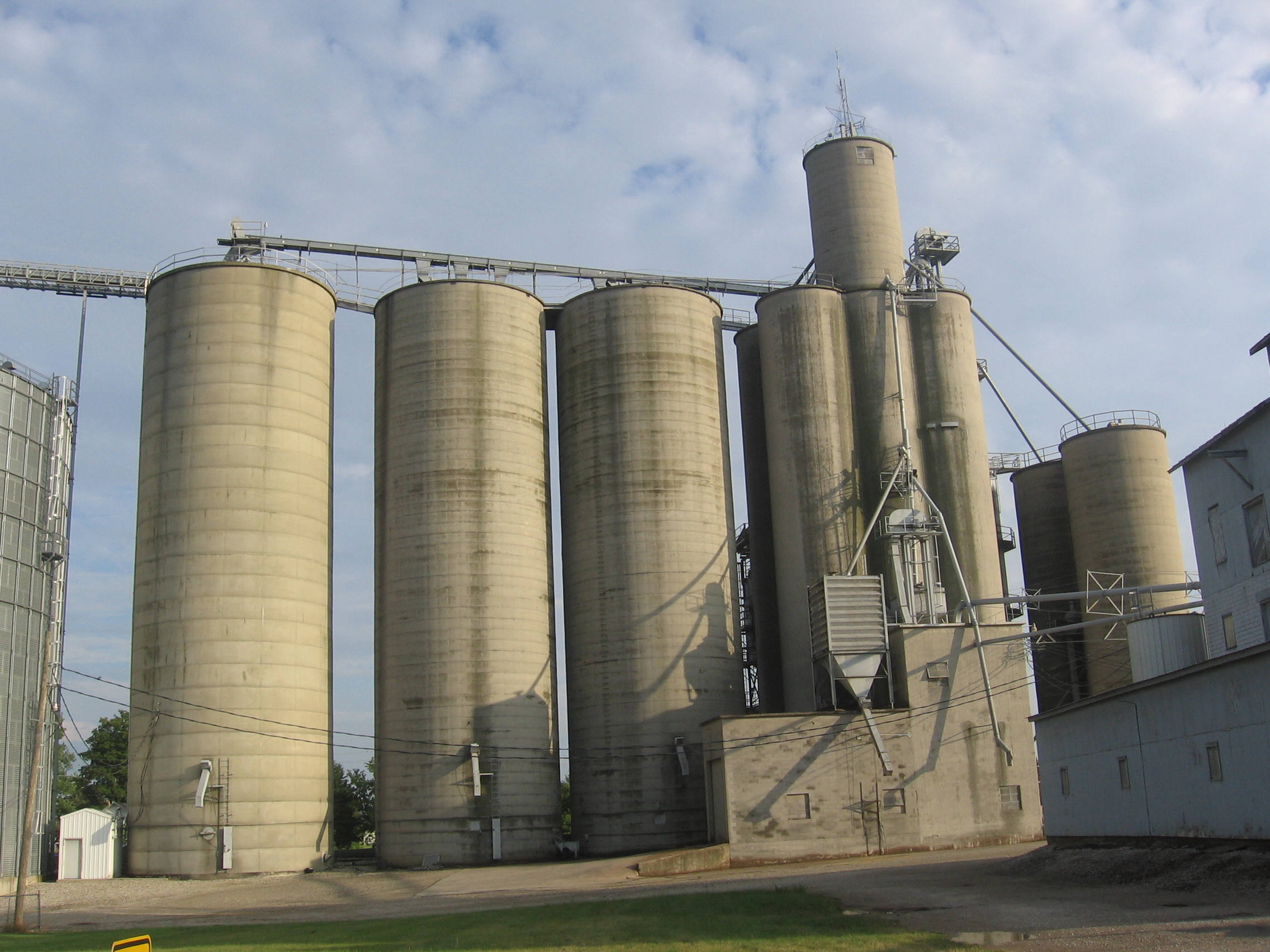
Jump-formed concrete annex silos on the left and slip-formed concrete mainhouse at an elevator facility in Edon, Ohio

Grain elevators in small Canadian communities often had the name of the community painted on two sides of the elevator in large block letters, with the name of the elevator operator emblazoned on the other two sides. This made identification of the community easier for rail operators (and incidentally, for lost drivers and pilots). The old community name often remained on an elevator long after the town had either disappeared or been amalgamated into another community; the grain elevator at Ellerslie, Alberta, remained marked with its old community name until it was demolished, which took place more than 20 years after the village had been annexed by Edmonton.

One of the major historical trends in the grain trade has been the closure of many smaller elevators and the consolidation of the grain trade to fewer places and among fewer companies. For example, in 1961, 1,642 "country elevators" (the smallest type) were in Alberta, holding 3,452,240 tonnes (3,805,440 short tons) of grain. By 2010, only 79 "primary elevators" (as they are now known) remained, holding 1,613,960 tonnes (1,779,090 short tons).

Despite this consolidation, overall storage capacity has increased in many places. In 2017, the United States had 0.88 cubic kilometres (25 billion US bushels) of storage capacity, a growth of 25% over the previous decade.

== Elevator Alley ==
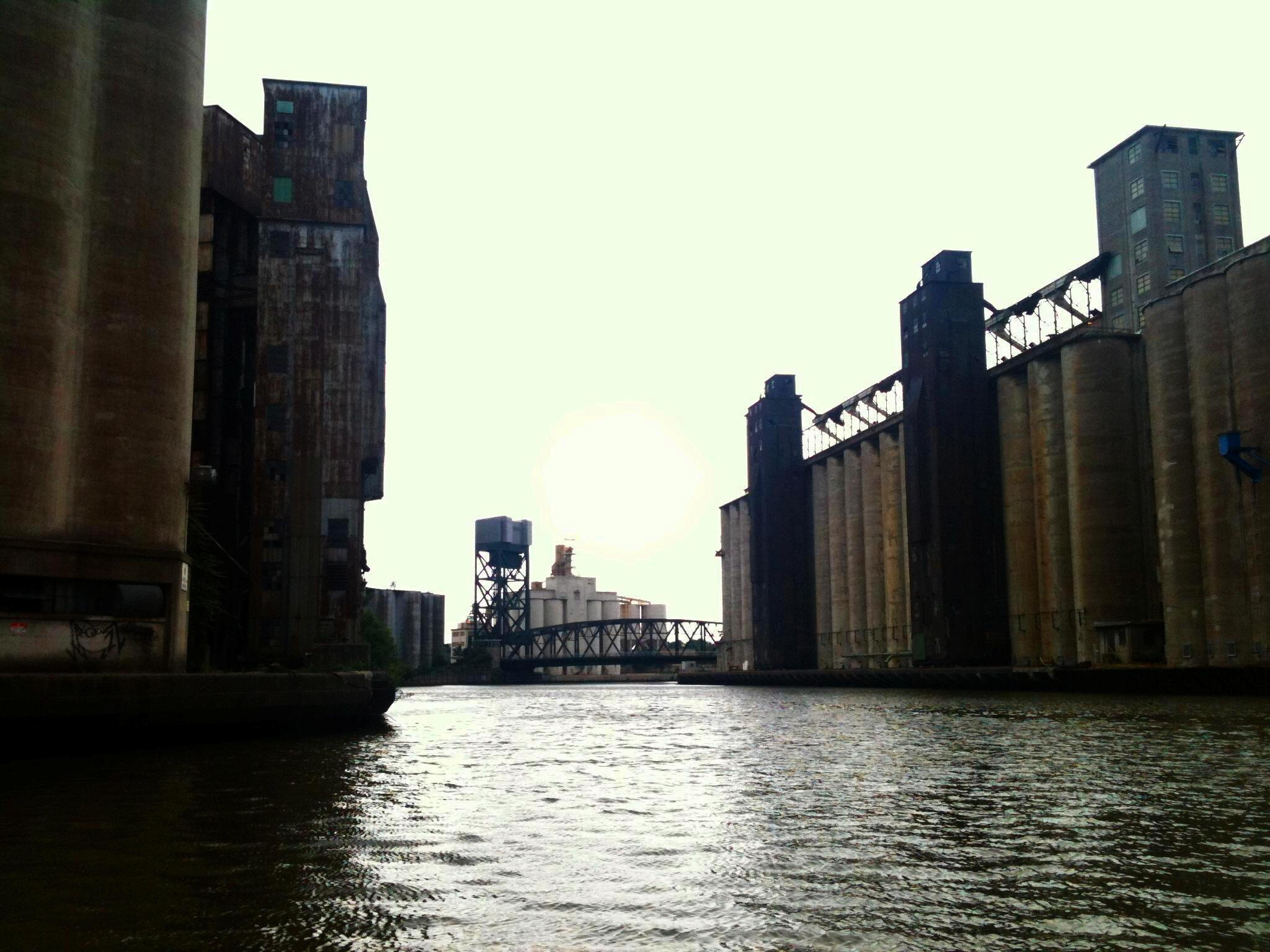
A view along Buffalo's "Elevator Alley".

The city of Buffalo is not only the birthplace of the modern grain elevator, but also has the world's largest number of extant examples. A number of the city's historic elevators are clustered along "Elevator Alley", a narrow stretch of the Buffalo River immediately adjacent to the harbor. The alley runs under Ohio Street and along Childs Street in the city's First Ward neighborhood.

== Elevator row ==
In Canada, the term "elevator row" refers to a row of four or more wood-crib prairie grain elevators.

In the early pioneer days of Western Canada's prairie towns, when a good farming spot was settled, many people wanted to make money by building their own grain elevators. This brought in droves of private grain companies. Towns boasted dozens of elevator companies, which all stood in a row along the railway tracks. If a town were lucky enough to have two railways, it was to be known as the next Montreal. Many elevator rows had two or more elevators of the same company. Small towns bragged of their large elevator rows in promotional pamphlets to attract settlers. With so much competition in the 1920s, consolidation began almost immediately, and many small companies were merged or absorbed into larger companies.

In the mid-1990s, with the cost of grain so low, many private elevator companies once again had to merge, this time causing thousands of "prairie sentinels" to be torn down. Because so many grain elevators have been torn down, Canada has only two surviving elevator rows; one located in Inglis, Manitoba, and the other in Warner, Alberta. The Inglis Grain Elevators National Historic Site has been protected as a National Historic Sites of Canada. The Warner elevator row is, as of 2019, not designated a historic site, and is still in use as commercial grain elevators.

== Elevator companies ==
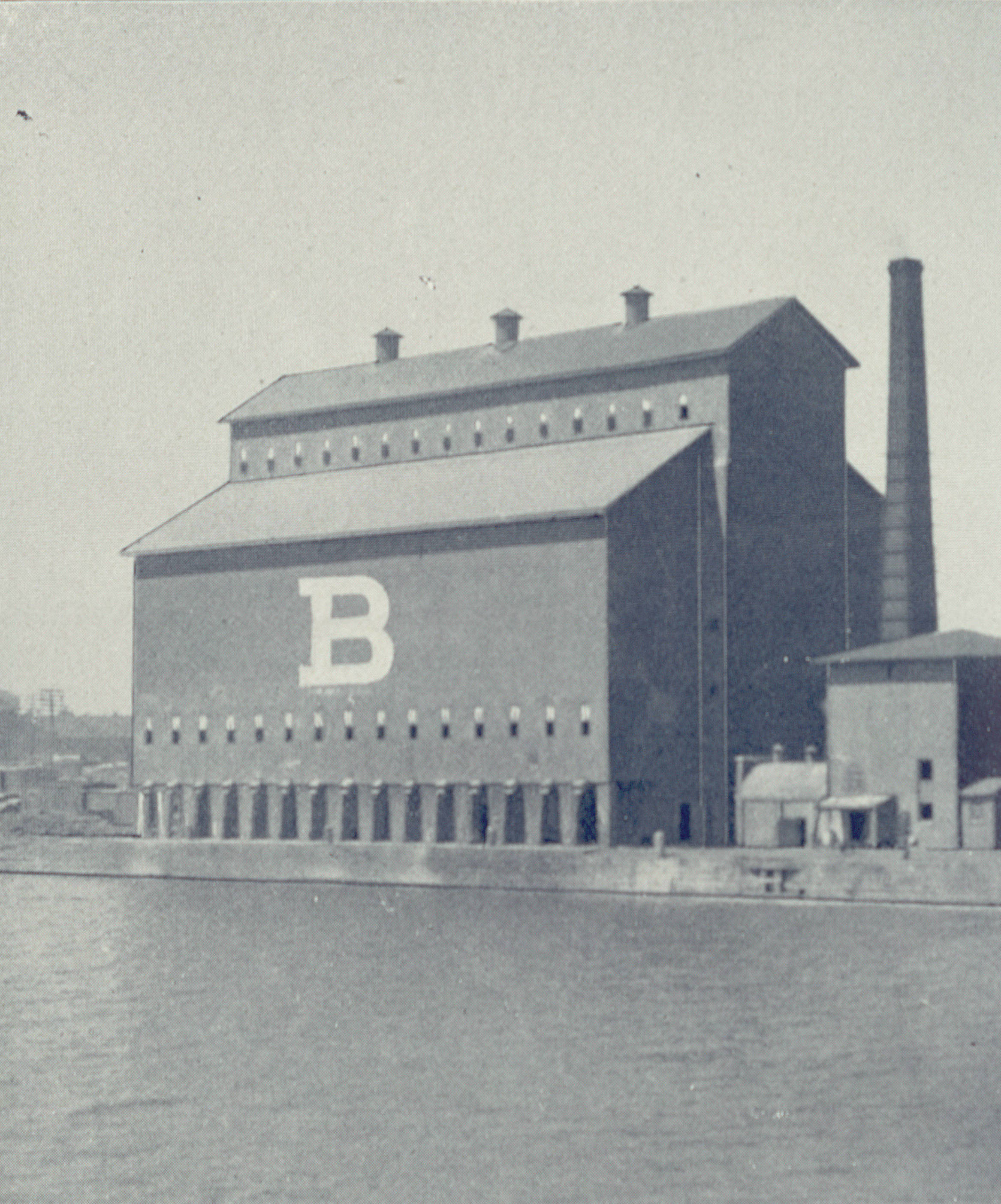
Lake Shore Elevator seen in Toledo, Ohio in 1895

=== Australia ===
- ABB Grain was founded as a mutual company, the Australian Barley Board, in 1939, by barley growers in South Australia and Victoria; after demutualization, it was acquired by Viterra (see below) in 2009; Australian Bulk Alliance, a joint venture between ABB and Sumitomo, operates facilities in some areas.
- CBH Group, a co-operative company, was established by grain growers in Western Australia, in 1933.
- GrainCorp was established by the government of New South Wales in 1917, as Government Grain Elevator, and was privatized in 1992.

=== Canada ===
All companies operating elevators in Canada are licensed by the Canadian Grain Commission.

- Agricore United was taken over by Saskatchewan Wheat Pool in 2007.
- Alberta Farmers' Co-operative Elevator Company merged into United Grain Growers in 1917.
- Alberta Pacific Grain Company was taken over by Federal Grain Co. in 1967.
- Alberta Wheat Pool merged with Manitoba Pool Elevators in 1997.
- Cargill was established in 1865 by W.W. Cargill.
- Federal Grain was sold to the three provincial wheat pools in 1972.
- Grain Growers' Grain Company merged into United Grain Growers in 1917.
- Lake of the Woods Milling Company
- Manitoba Pool Elevators merged with Alberta Wheat Pool in 1997.
- Parrish & Heimbecker was established in 1909 by the two families of William Parrish and Norman G. Heimbecker.
- Paterson Grain was established in 1908 as the N. M. Paterson Co.
- Richardson International was established in 1857 by James Richardson; it is also known as Richardson Pioneer.
- Saskatchewan Co-operative Elevator Company was taken over by the Saskatchewan Wheat Pool in 1926.
- Saskatchewan Wheat Pool took over Agricore United in 2007 to form Viterra.
- United Grain Growers was taken over by Agricore United in 2001.
- Viterra was established after the take-over of Agricore United by the Saskatchewan Wheat Pool.

=== Sweden ===
- In Sweden, the vast majority of grain elevators belong to the Lantmännen co-operative movement, owned by grain-growing farmers.

=== United States ===
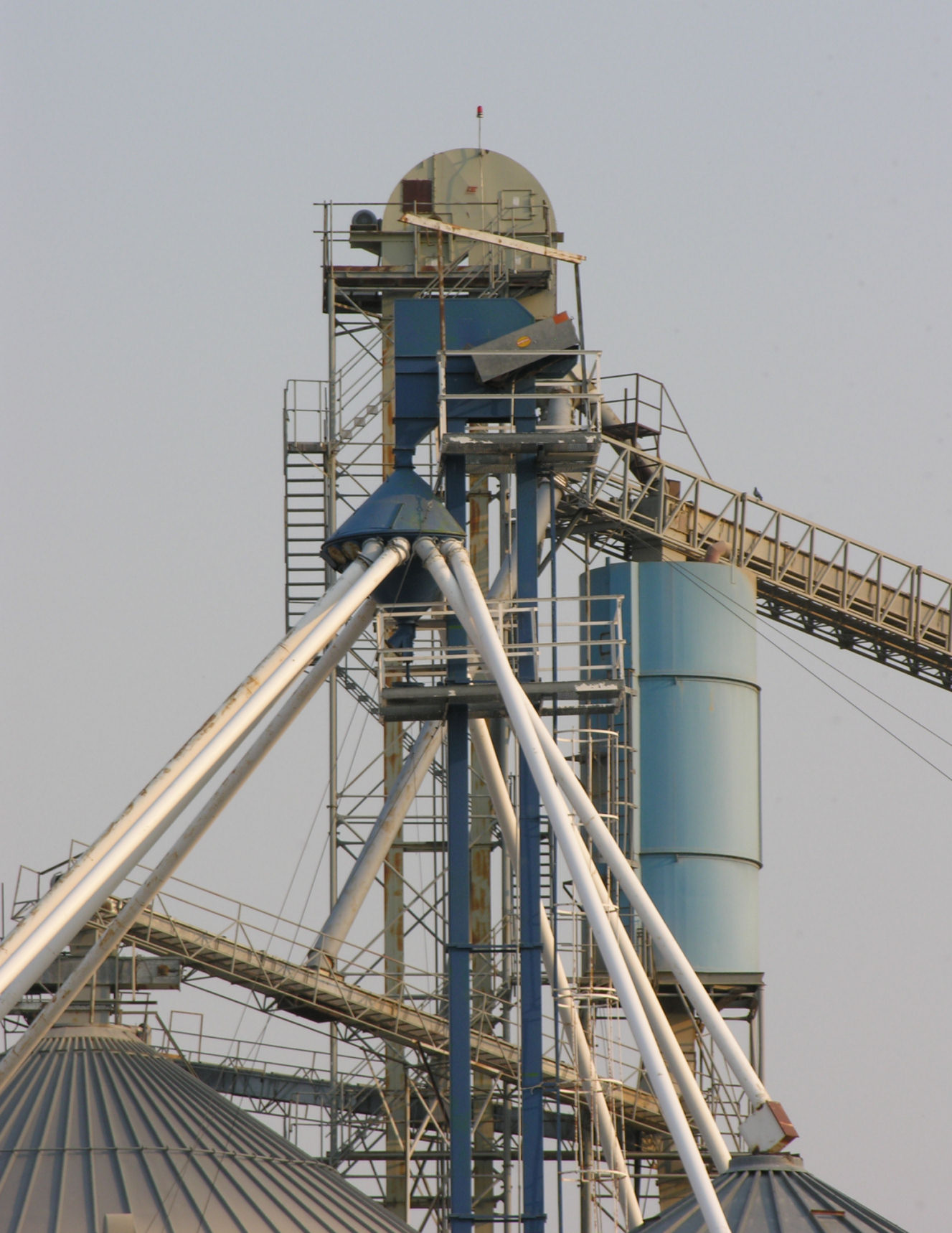
General Mills grain-distribution facility detail, Idaho Falls, Idaho

- ADM Milling
- Cargill
- General Mills
- Monarch Engineering Co. (builder)
- Montana Elevator Co.
- Perdue Agribusiness
- Scoular
- Smithfield Grain
- Southern States Cooperative
- Tyson
- United Grain Growers

=== Denmark ===
- FM Bulk Handling - Fjordvejs

== Notable grain elevators ==
This is a list of grain elevators that are either in the process of becoming heritage sites or museums, or have been preserved for future generations.

=== Canada ===
==== Alberta ====
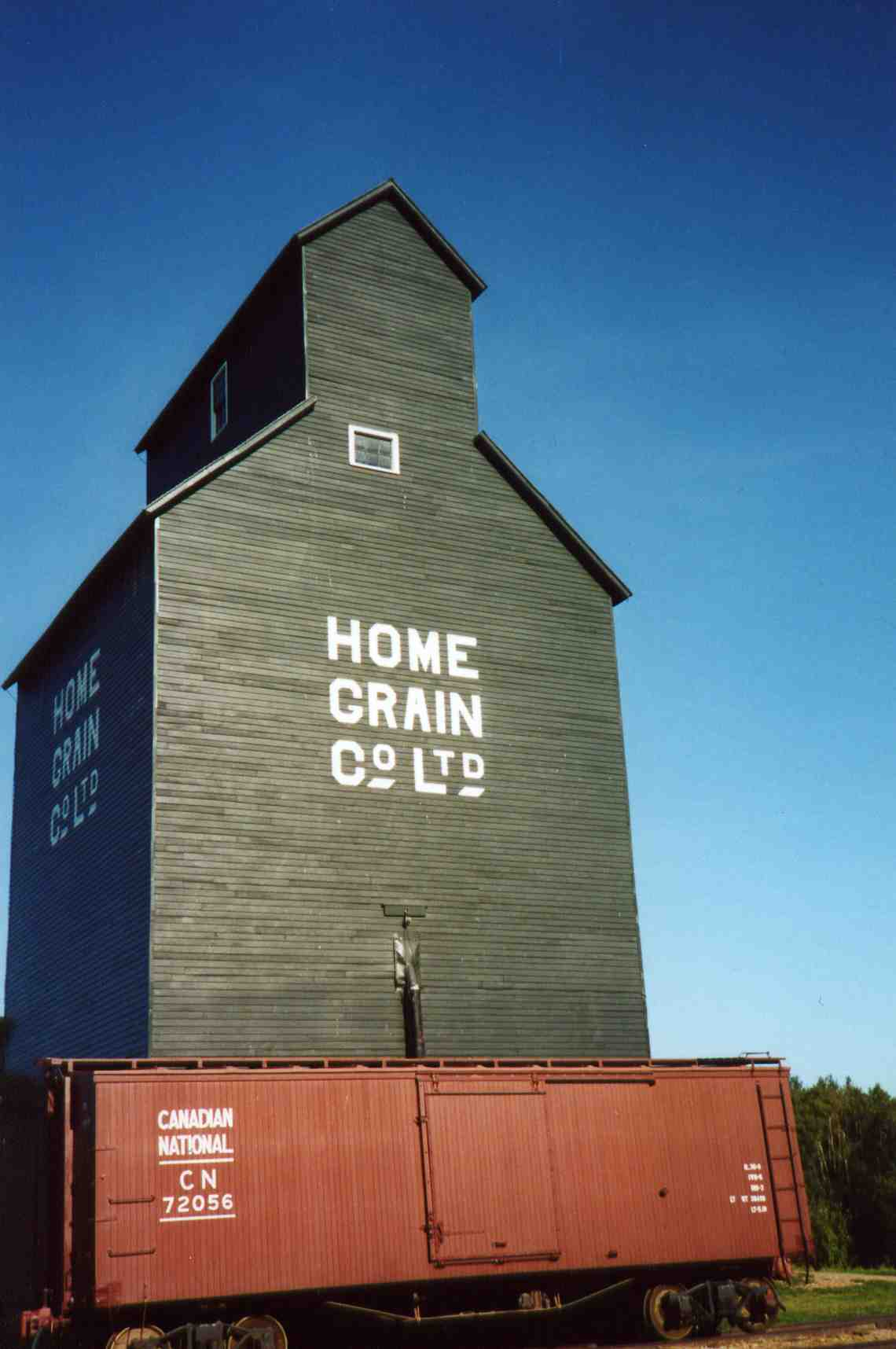
Home Grain Co. wooden cribbed elevator at the Ukrainian Cultural Heritage Village in Alberta

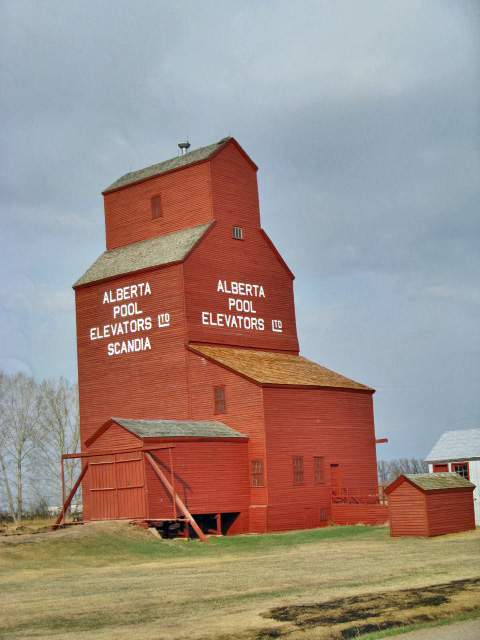
Alberta Wheat Pool elevator Ltd. wooden cribbed elevator at the Scandia Eastern Irrigation District Museum in Scandia, Alberta

- Acadia Valley – Prairie Elevator Museum, former Alberta Wheat Pool converted into a tea house and museum
- Alberta Central Railroad Museum – former Alberta Wheat Pool, second-oldest standing grain elevator in Alberta, moved from Hobbema
- Castor – former Alberta Pacific, restored into a museum
- Big Valley – Alberta Wheat Pool used as a museum complete with a train station and roundhouse
- Edmonton – Ritchie Mill, former flour mill converted into restaurants, law offices, and condominiums
- Heritage Acres Farm Museum – restored United Grain Growers elevator moved from Brocket
- Heritage Park Historical Village, former Security Elevator Co. Ltd. moved from Shonts
- Leduc – former Alberta Wheat Pool saved from demolition now a museum
- Mayerthorpe – 1966 Federal Grain Co., now an interpretive center
- Meeting Creek – a refurbished Alberta Wheat Pool, Pacific Grain elevator and CN train station
- Nanton – Canadian Grain Elevator Discovery Centre, three elevators saved from demolition and preserved to educate visitors about the town's, and Alberta's, agricultural history
- Radway – Krause Milling Co. restored into a museum
- Scandia – Scandia Eastern Irrigation District Museum, 1920s Alberta Wheat Pool and stockyard now a museum
- South Peace Centennial Museum, United Grain Growers moved from Albright
- Spruce Grove – Spruce Grove Grain Elevator Museum, former Alberta Wheat Pool, now a museum
- St. Albert – St. Albert Grain Elevator Park, a 1906 Alberta Grain Co. and 1929 Alberta Wheat Pool Elevators now restored as a historic park
- Stettler – a 1920 Parrish and Heimbecker grain elevator, feed mill, and coal shed, last to stand in Alberta, now protected and restored as a museum
- Ukrainian Cultural Heritage Village – former Home Grain Co. moved from Bellis

==== British Columbia ====
- Creston – former Alberta Wheat Pool (1936) and United Grain Growers (1937) elevators on the edge of the downtown core in the Creston Valley. The two buildings were purchased by the Columbia Basin Trust in 2018. The wheat pool elevator was extensively refurbished and now includes an art gallery. The UGG elevator is beyond feasible conservation efforts however, and CBT has begun to deconstruct it in 2024, with care taken to re-purpose as much of the building materials as possible, including valuable first-growth timbers and historic equipment.

==== Manitoba ====
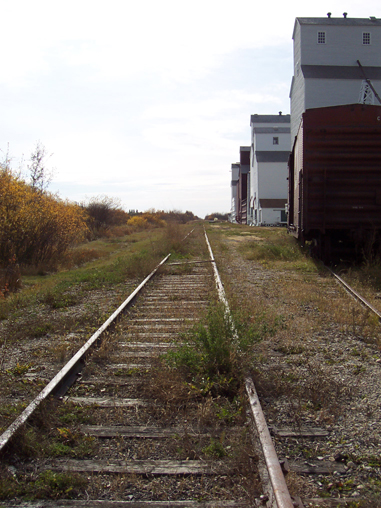
Inglis elevator row, Inglis, Manitoba

- Inglis – Inglis Grain Elevators National Historic Site, last surviving elevator row in Manitoba with a total of four elevators. Now designated and protected as a National Historic Site of Canada
- Niverville – Western Canada's first grain elevator, erected by William Hespeler in 1879

==== Quebec ====
- Silo No. 5, Montreal – This grain elevator was completed in four stages from 1906 to 1959 and was abandoned in 1994. With the demolition of Silo No. 1 and Silo No. 2, Silo No. 5 is now, along with the Old Port's conveyor pier tower, the last vestige of Old Montreal's 20th-century harbour panorama.

==== Saskatchewan ====
- Sukanen Ship Pioneer Village and Museum – former Victoria – McCabe moved from Mawer
- North Battleford Western Development Museum, former Saskatchewan Wheat Pool moved from Keatley

=== South Africa ===
- Port of Cape Town – once the tallest building in Cape Town, now restored to become the Zeitz Museum of Contemporary Art Africa

=== Switzerland ===
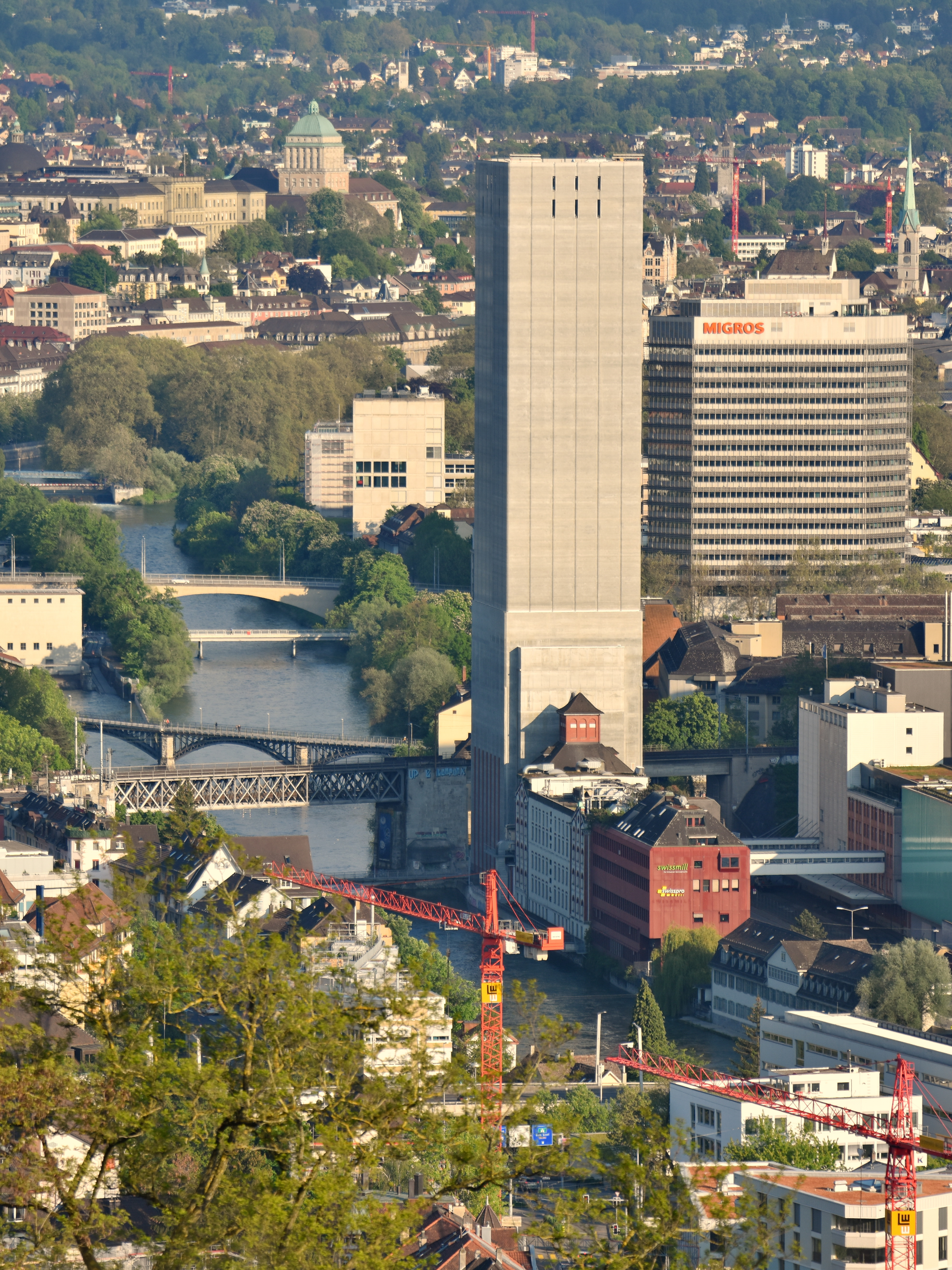
Swissmill Tower, upper Limmat Valley in the Canton of Zürich

- Swissmill Tower in upper Limmat Valley in the Canton of Zürich – 118 m (387 ft) high, rebuilt by April 2016.

=== United Kingdom ===
The Manchester Ship Canal grain elevator was completed in 1898. It had a capacity of 40,000 tons and its automatic conveying and spouting system could distribute grain into 226 bins.

=== United States ===
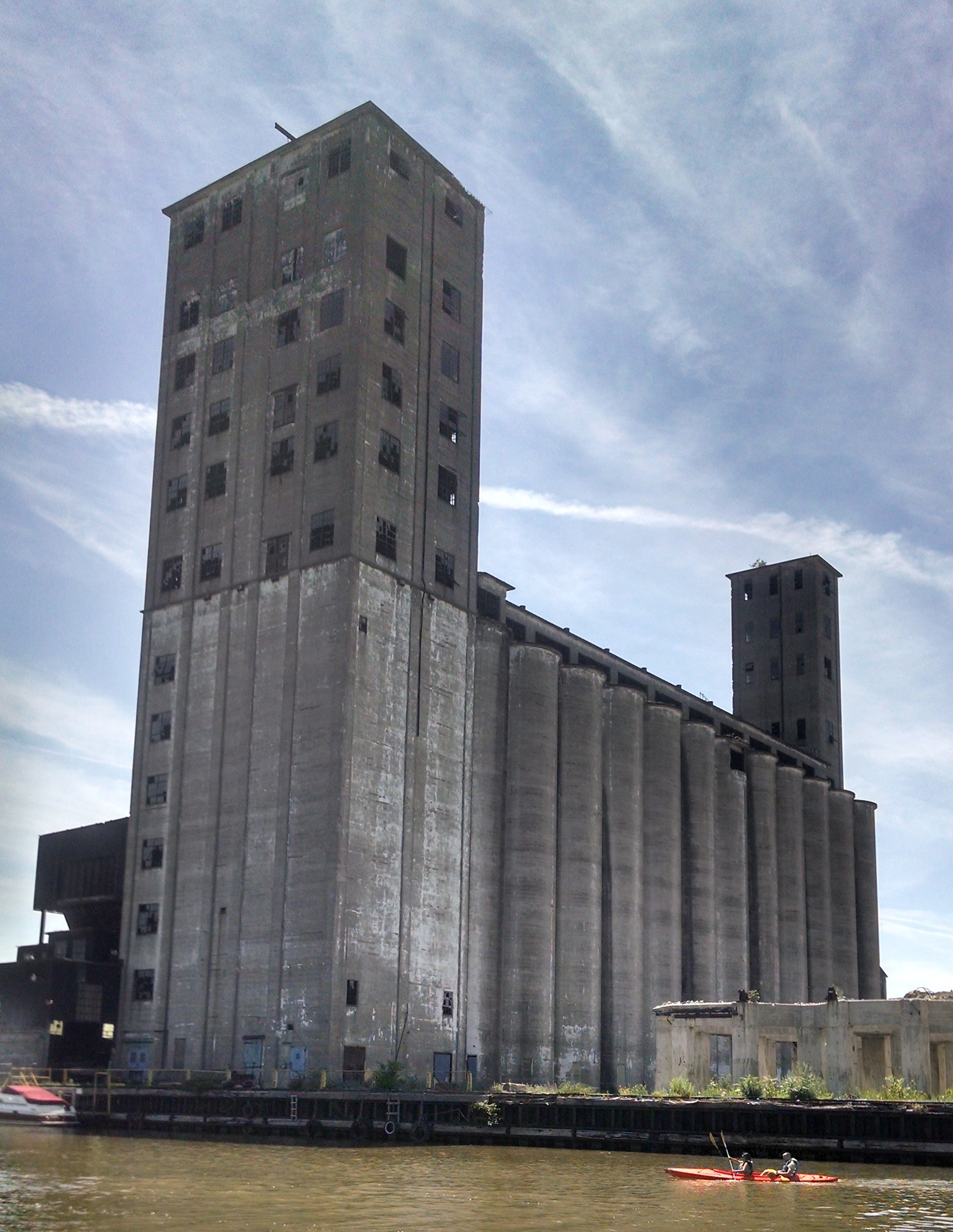
Wheeler Elevator, Buffalo

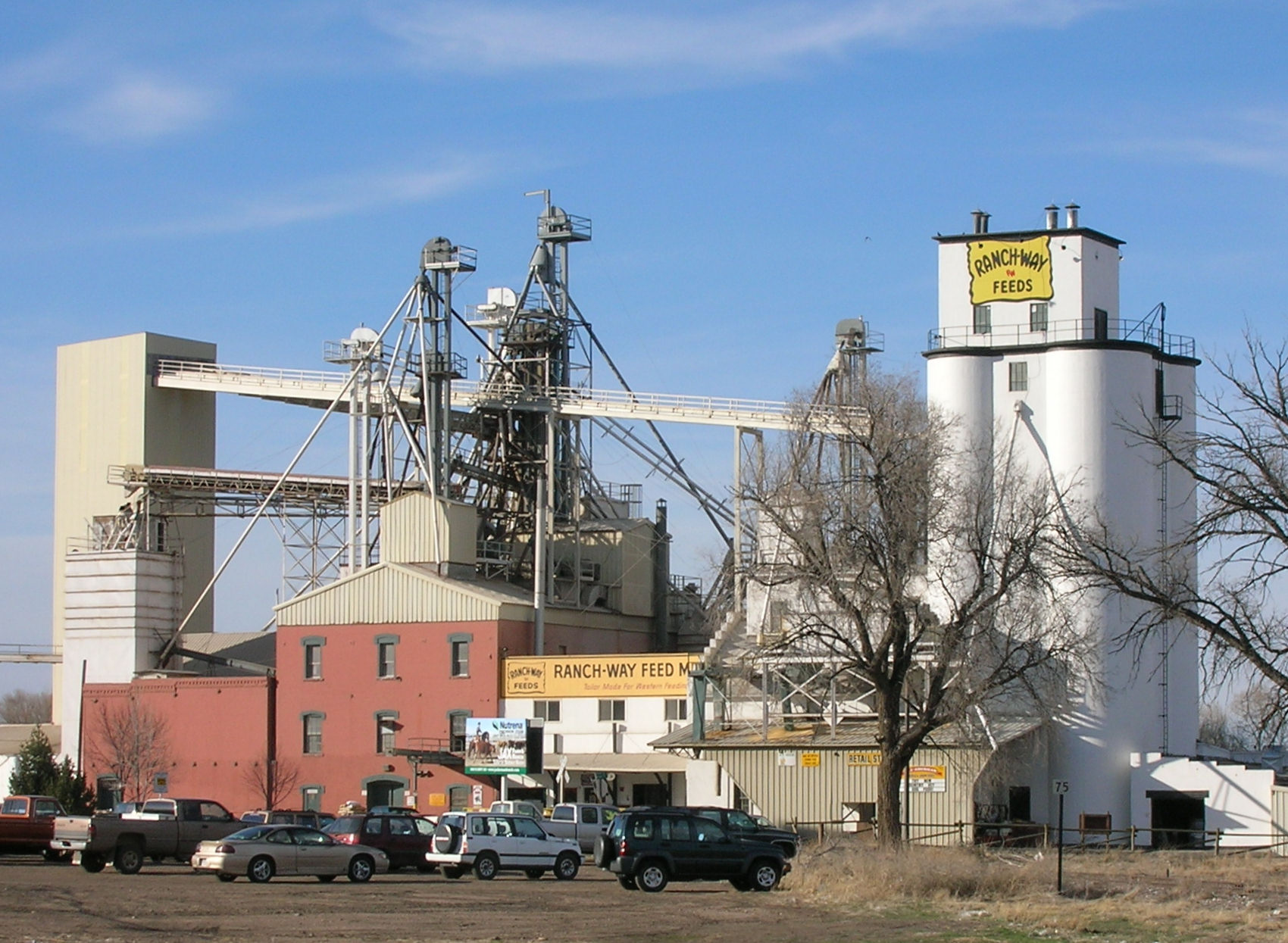
Ranchway Feeds mill and elevator, Fort Collins, Colorado

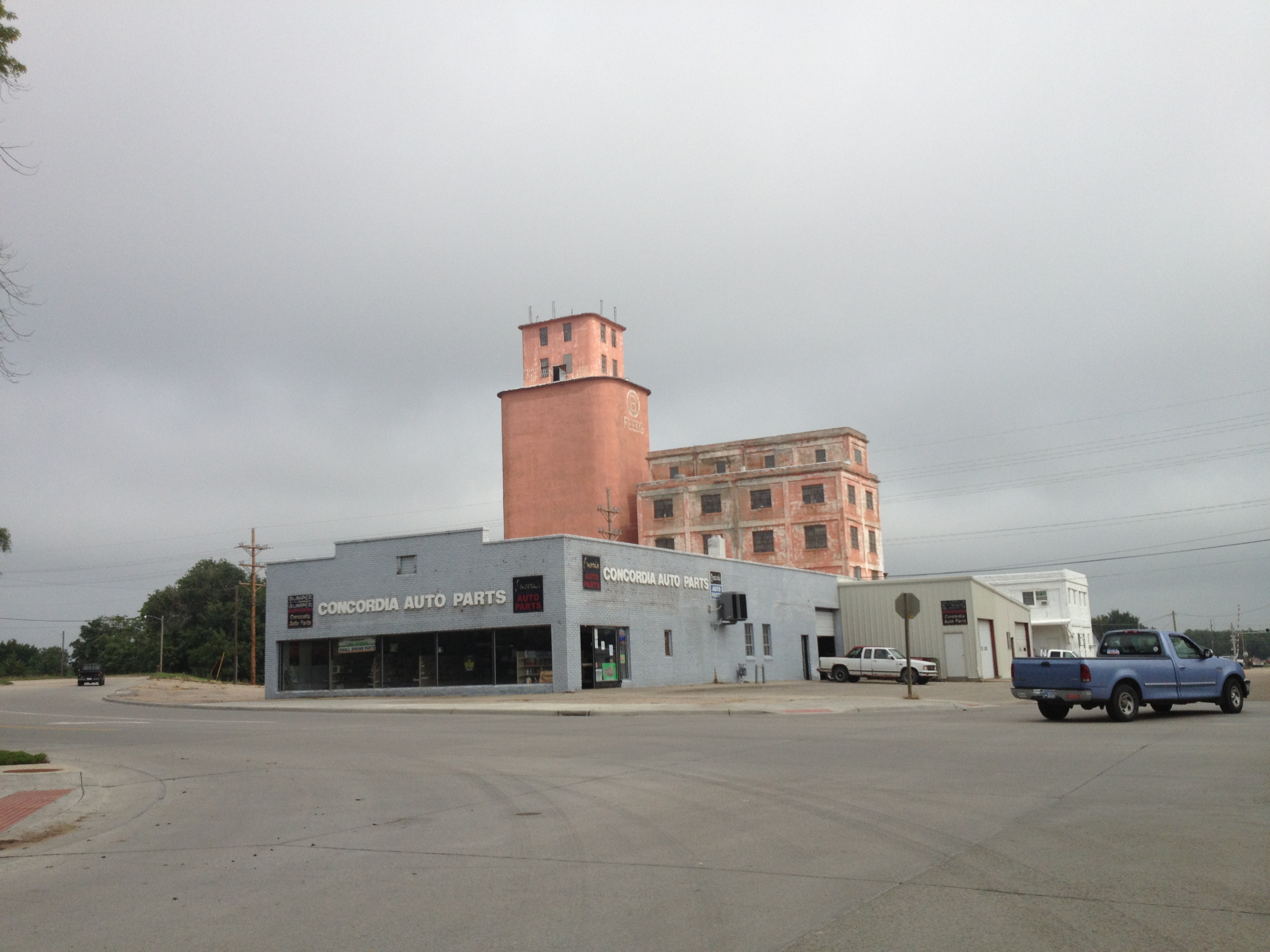
Circle B grain elevator, Concordia, Kansas

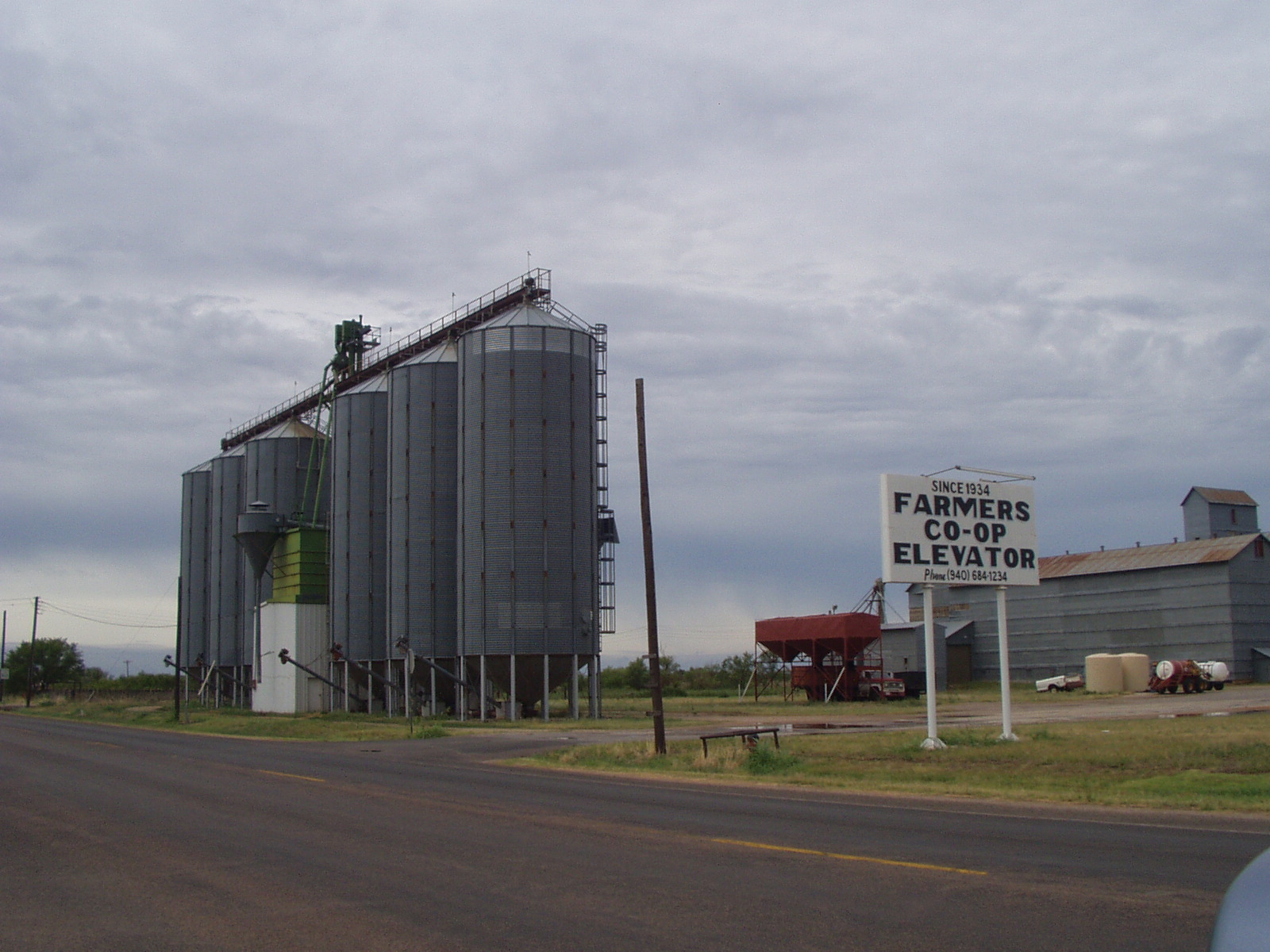
Historic Cooperative Elevator, a row of corrugated steel hopper bottom bins on the left and cribbed annex bins on the right, Crowell, Texas

==== Maryland ====
- Baltimore and Ohio Locust Point Grain Terminal Elevator, one of the largest grain terminal elevators to be constructed in the early 20th century, with a capacity of 130,000,000 cubic metres (3.8 billion US bushels) in Baltimore, Maryland

==== New York ====
- American Grain Complex, built between 1905 and 1931
- Cargill Pool Elevator, previously named the Saskatchewan Cooperative Elevator was built in 1925 offered a total holding capacity of 74,000 cubic metres (2.1 million US bushels) in 135 bins
- Concrete-Central Elevator, Buffalo, New York – The largest transfer elevator in the world at the time of its completion in 1917
- Great Northern Elevator, built in 1897 by the Great Northern Railroad; demolished September 2022-May 2023.
- Wollenberg Grain and Seed Elevator – wooden "country style" elevator formerly located in Buffalo, New York; destroyed by fire in October 2006

==== Illinois ====
- Armour's Warehouse – constructed in 1861–62 on the north bank of the Illinois-Michigan Canal in Seneca, Illinois

==== Iowa ====
- Historic Ely Elevator - Also known as the Woitishek/King/Krob elevator and feed mill. Constructed in 1900 in Ely, Iowa, and was in continuous use for 121 years.

==== Minnesota ====
- Ceresota Building was a receiving and public grain elevator built by the Northwestern Consolidated Milling Company in 1908 in Minneapolis, Minnesota
- Peavey–Haglin Experimental Concrete Grain Elevator, St. Louis Park, Minnesota, built in 1899–1900
- Saint Paul Municipal Grain Terminal, in St. Paul, Minnesota, on the NRHP

==== North Dakota ====
- North Dakota Mill and Elevator, largest flour mill in the United States, located in Grand Forks, North Dakota

==== Oklahoma ====
- Ingersoll Tile Elevator, elevator constructed of hollow red clay tiles, located in Ingersoll, Oklahoma

==== Pennsylvania ====
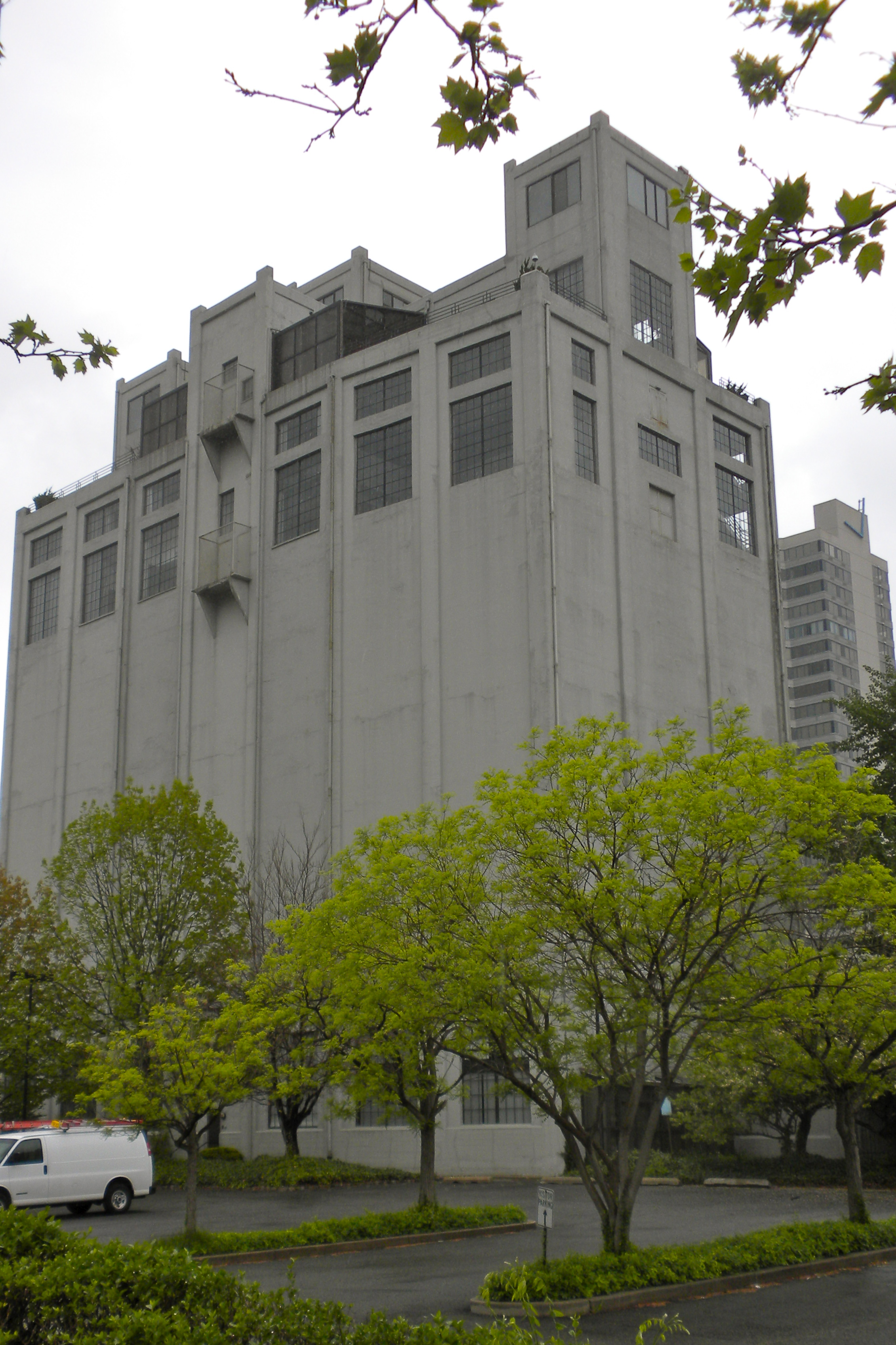
Reading Company Grain Elevator near Center City, Philadelphia, now converted into offices

- Reading Company Grain Elevator, export elevator in Philadelphia converted into offices

==== South Dakota ====
- Zip Feed Tower, tallest occupiable structure in South Dakota from its construction in 1956–1957 until its demolition in December 2005

==== Virginia ====
- Sewell's Point grain elevator, export elevator built by the city of Norfolk in 1922 to help the port of Norfolk better compete with other East Coast ports by providing a publicly owned facility to store and load grain at reasonable rates. It was sold to the Norfolk and Western railroad in 1929, and leased from N&W by Continental grain in 1952. The elevator originally held 26,000 m^{3} (750,000 US bu) but was later expanded to 120,000 m^{3} (3,500,000 US bu). The elevator was taken over by Cargill in the late 1980s and abandoned around the turn of the 21st century. The elevator was demolished by Norfolk Southern in 2008.
- Southern States silos, a grain elevator in Richmond, Virginia originally built in the 1940s by Cargill, and currently leased by Perdue Farms is the tallest structure south of the James River in the city of Richmond. The elevator was the site of the 3rd RVA Street Art Festival.

==== Wisconsin ====
- Chase Grain Elevator, tile grain elevator built in 1922. Sun Prairie, Wisconsin Placed on the National Register of Historic Places in 2010. It is the last remaining tile elevator in Wisconsin.

==== Wyoming ====
- Sheridan Flouring Mills, Inc., an industrial complex in Sheridan, Wyoming

== Elevator explosions ==
Given a large enough suspension of combustible flour or grain dust in the air, a significant explosion can occur. The 1878 explosion of the Washburn "A" Mill in Minneapolis, Minnesota, killed 18, leveled two nearby mills, damaged many others, and caused a destructive fire that gutted much of the nearby milling district. (The Washburn "A" mill was later rebuilt and continued to be used until 1965.) Another example occurred in 1998, when the DeBruce grain elevator in Wichita, Kansas, exploded and killed seven people. An explosion on October 29, 2011, at the Bartlett Grain Company in Atchison, Kansas, killed six people. Two more men received severe burns, but the remaining four were not hurt.

Almost any finely divided organic substance becomes an explosive material when dispersed as an air suspension; hence, a very fine flour is dangerously explosive in air suspension. This poses a significant risk when milling grain to produce flour, so mills go to great lengths to remove sources of sparks. These measures include carefully sifting the grain before it is milled or ground to remove stones, which could strike sparks from the millstones, and the use of magnets to remove metallic debris able to strike sparks.

The earliest recorded flour explosion took place in an Italian mill in 1785, but many have occurred since. These two references give numbers of recorded flour and dust explosions in the United States in 1994: and 1997 In the ten-year period up to and including 1997, there were 129 explosions.

== Media ==
Canadian Prairie grain elevators were the subjects of the National Film Board of Canada documentaries Grain Elevator and Death of a Skyline.

During the sixth season of the History Channel series Ax Men, one of the featured crews takes on the job of dismantling the Globe Elevator in Wisconsin. This structure was the largest grain-storage facility in the world when it was built in the 1880s.

== See also ==
- Silo
- Grain bin
- Grain entrapment
- Granary
- Dust explosion
- List of grain elevators
