= Terminal elevator =

Large grain elevator

A terminal elevator is a large grain elevator with the capacity to transfer grain to rail cars, barges, or ships for transport to domestic or foreign markets. Terminal elevator markets are used as base locations for posted county prices.
