= American Grain Complex =

- U.S. National Register of Historic Places
- New York State Register of Historic Places
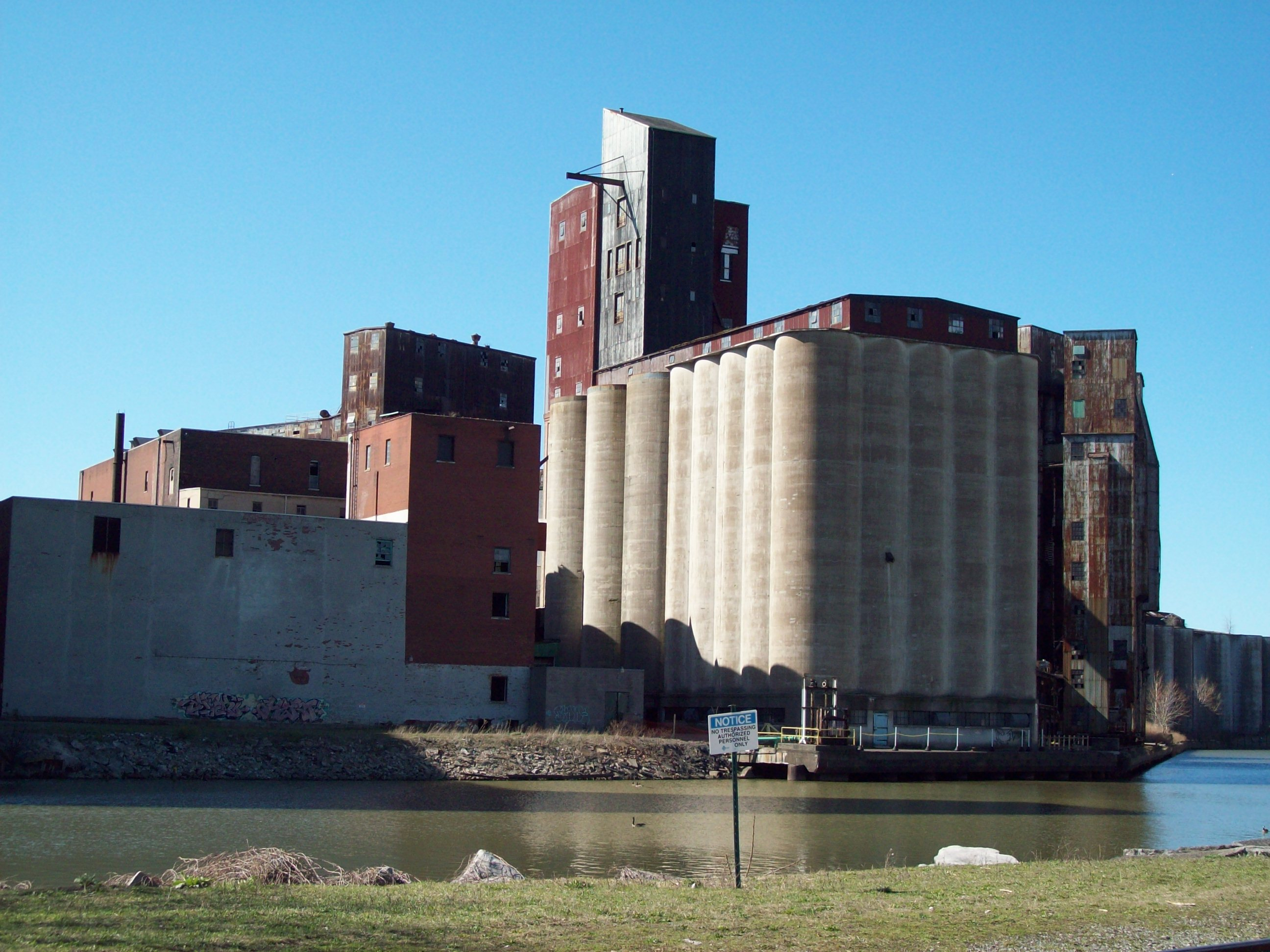
- American Grain Complex, April 2012

- Location within New York Location within the United States
- Location: 87 Childs St., Buffalo, New York
- Coordinates: 42°51′40″N 78°51′56″W
- Area: 4.37 acres (1.77 ha)
- Built: 1905–1931
- Architects: James Stewart & Company
- MPS: Buffalo Grain and Materials Elevator MPS
- NRHP reference No.: 12000475
- NYSRHP No.: 02940.024125

Significant dates
- Added to NRHP: August 7, 2012
- Designated NYSRHP: June 8, 2012

American Grain Complex, also known as "The American", Russell-Miller Milling Co. Elevator, and Peavey Co. Elevator, is a historic grain elevator and flour milling complex located in South Buffalo, Buffalo, Erie County, New York. The complex consists of three contributing buildings and two contributing structures. They are the Elevator Building (1905/1906, 1931), Flour Building (1906-1924), office building (c. 1920), Moveable Marine Tower, and railroad tracks. The Elevator Building consists of the mainhouse, workhouse, and fixed marine tower, all built in 1905–1906, and an annex constructed in 1931. The complex was last owned by ConAgra Foods, who closed the elevator and mill in June 2001.

It was listed on the National Register of Historic Places in 2012.
