= Ingersoll Tile Elevator =

- U.S. National Register of Historic Places
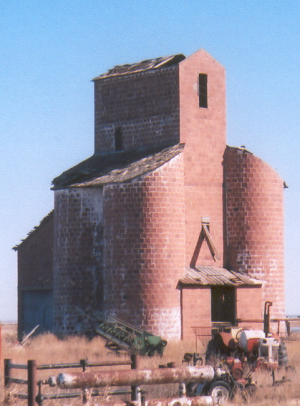

- Location within Oklahoma Location within the United States
- Location: Ingersoll, Oklahoma
- Coordinates: 36°47′49.37″N 98°23′20.41″W
- MPS: Clay Tile Grain Elevators in Northwestern Oklahoma TR
- NRHP reference No.: 83004156
- Added to NRHP: October 7, 1983

The Ingersoll Tile Elevator, located in Ingersoll, Oklahoma, was listed on the National Register of Historic Places in 1983. The elevator is constructed of hollow red clay tiles. Built around 1920, it was added to the Register because of its significance in the transition from wooden grain elevators to concrete. The elevator stands on the south side of US 64 and is in disrepair.
