= Great Northern Elevator =

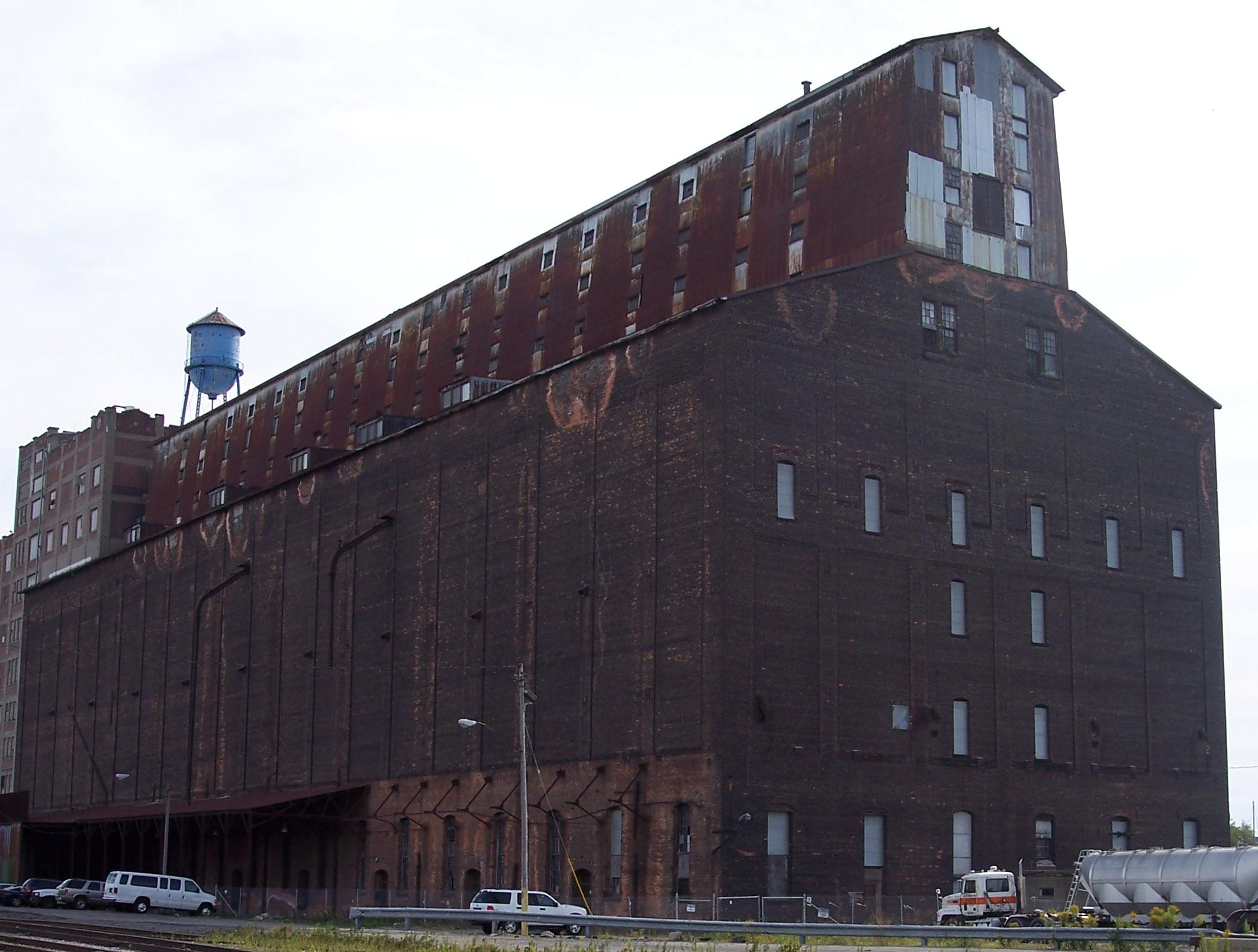
- Great Northern Elevator before the brickwork collapsed.
- Interactive map of the Great Northern Elevator area
- Former names: Mutual Elevator, Pillsbury Elevator

General information
- Status: Demolished
- Type: Steel grain elevator
- Architectural style: Vernacular
- Location: 250 Ganson Street, Buffalo, New York, United States
- Coordinates: 42.866725°N 78.87221°W
- Construction started: March 31, 1897
- Completed: September 29, 1897
- Demolished: September 2022 - May 2023
- Management: ADM Milling

Height
- Roof: 187 feet (57.0 m)

Design and construction
- Developer: Great Northern Railway
- Structural engineer: Max Toltz, D. A. Robinson
- Main contractor: James J. Hall, Riter-Conley

The Great Northern Elevator was a grain storage facility at 250 Ganson Street in Buffalo, New York. The elevator was located on the City Ship Canal and at the time of its completion in 1897, the elevator was the world's largest. The elevator was the first to employ cylindrical steel bins for grain storage, and also one of the first to run on electricity. The brick curtain wall did not support the bins or the working house and was designed as weatherproofing only.

== History ==
The Great Northern Elevator was built by noted Chicago elevator builder D. A. Robinson. Max Toltz, a bridge engineer with the Great Northern Railroad was the consulting engineer for the building and responsible for much of the building design. At the time of demolition, the building was the last of the "brick box" type working house grain elevators still standing in North America.

=== Ownership ===
- The Mutual Elevator company bought the elevator from the Great Northern Railroad in March 1903.
- In 1921, a local buffalo group named the Island Warehouse Corporation purchased the building and railroad right-of-way.
- The Pillsbury Company bought the elevator in 1935 and operated within the facility until 1981.
- In the 1990s Archer Daniels Midland acquired the building with the intention of demolishing it.

== Storage ==
The Great Northern Elevator offered a total holding capacity of 2.52 to 3 million US bushels (89,000 to 106,000 m^{3}) in 48 large steel bins. Thirty of the bins are 38 feet (12 m) in diameter and 18 of the bins are 15.5 feet (4.7 m) in diameter. The elevator's brick exterior serves as a weather barrier and does not help to carry the weight of the cupola or the grain bins. The building's structure is supported by a web of steel I-beams. The building was originally equipped with three corrugated-iron nine-story-high iron legs designed to move along tracks. These were destroyed during a storm in 1922 and replaced by two new 145-foot (44 m) marine leg towers built by the Monarch Engineering Co. A concrete framed flour mill addition was erected in 1924.

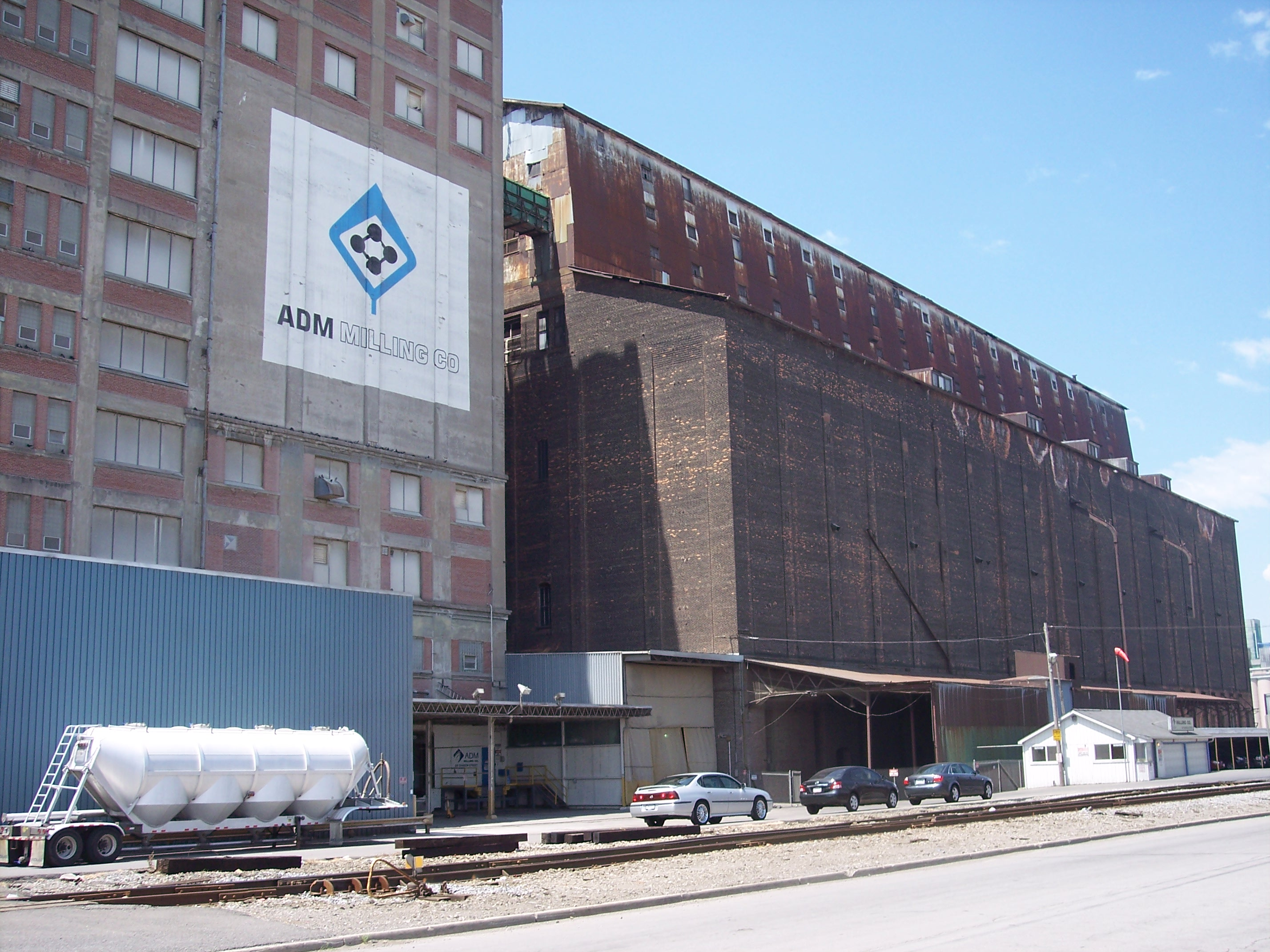
ADM sign painted on the adjoining building

== Final years ==
In the late 1980s, then-owner Pillsbury requested a permit to raze the structure. This was opposed, and culminated in the Great Northern's designation as a city of Buffalo landmark. In 1996 and 2003 demolition of the building complex was again requested by subsequent and current owner Archer Daniels Midland (ADM). Both times it was denied. Until its demolition, the building remained one of the earliest surviving elevators in the Buffalo River District.

On December 11, 2021, during a wind storm in Buffalo, the north-facing wall of the building partially collapsed, exposing some of the innovative cylindrical grain bins inside. On December 17, the City of Buffalo ordered the emergency demolition of the historic elevator. The Campaign for Greater Buffalo History, Architecture & Culture sued the city and owner ADM in State Supreme Court to block the demolition. The court found for the City and owner, whereupon the Campaign appealed to the fourth District Appellate Court. New York State appellate justice Tracey Bannister granted a temporary restraining order against demolition. Demolition began in September 2022, and was completed by May 2023.

== Gallery ==
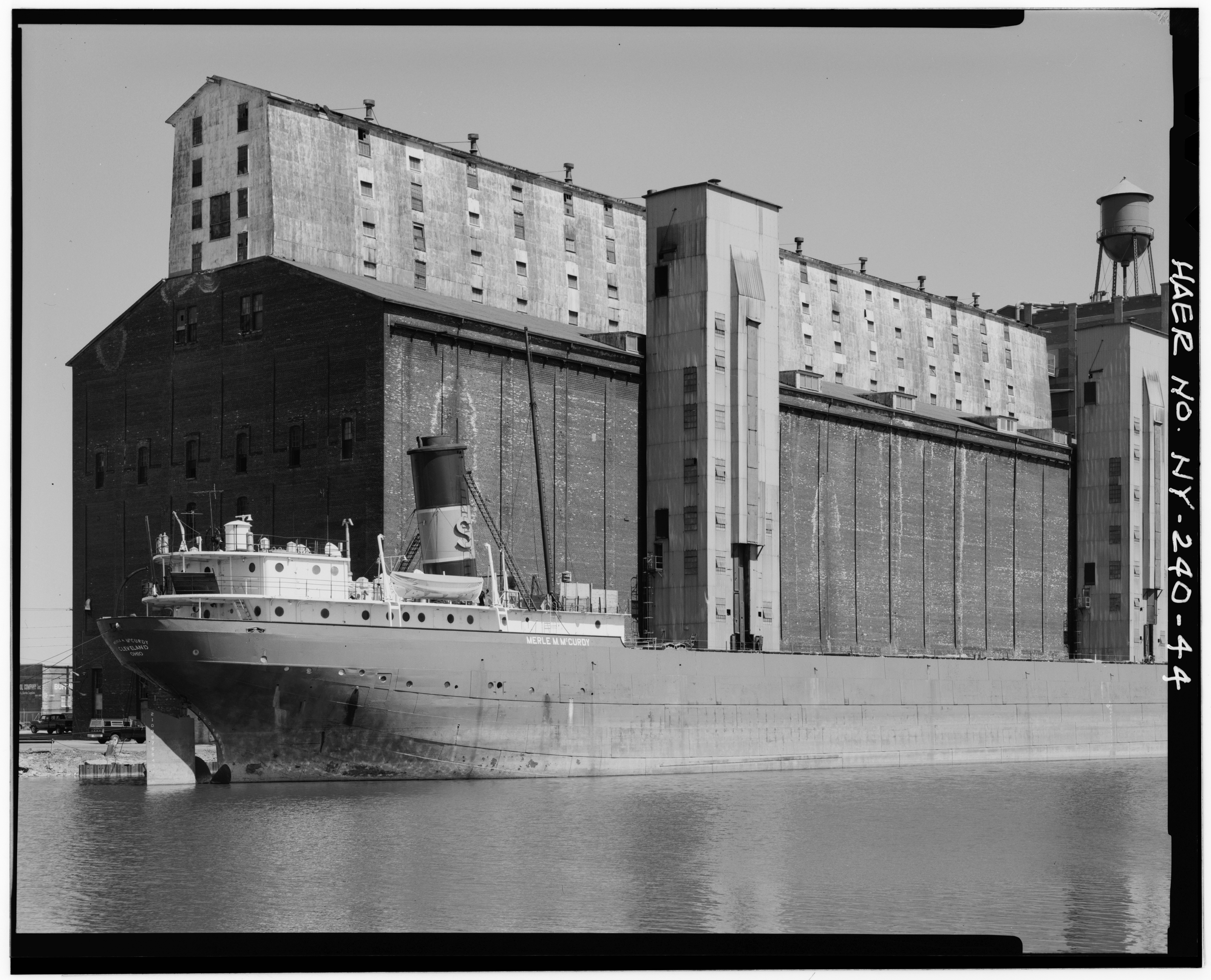
1985 photo

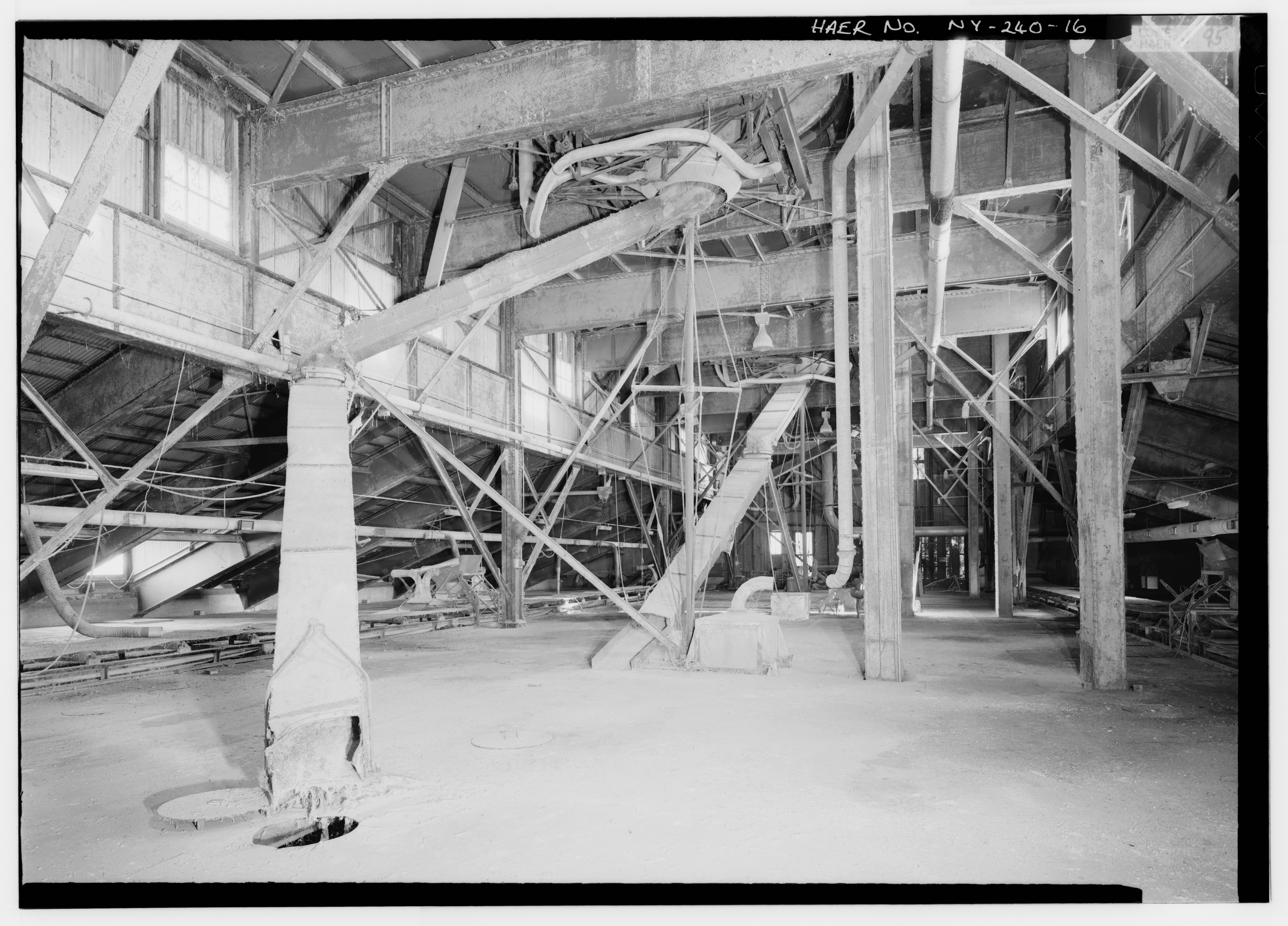
Detail of distribution chute

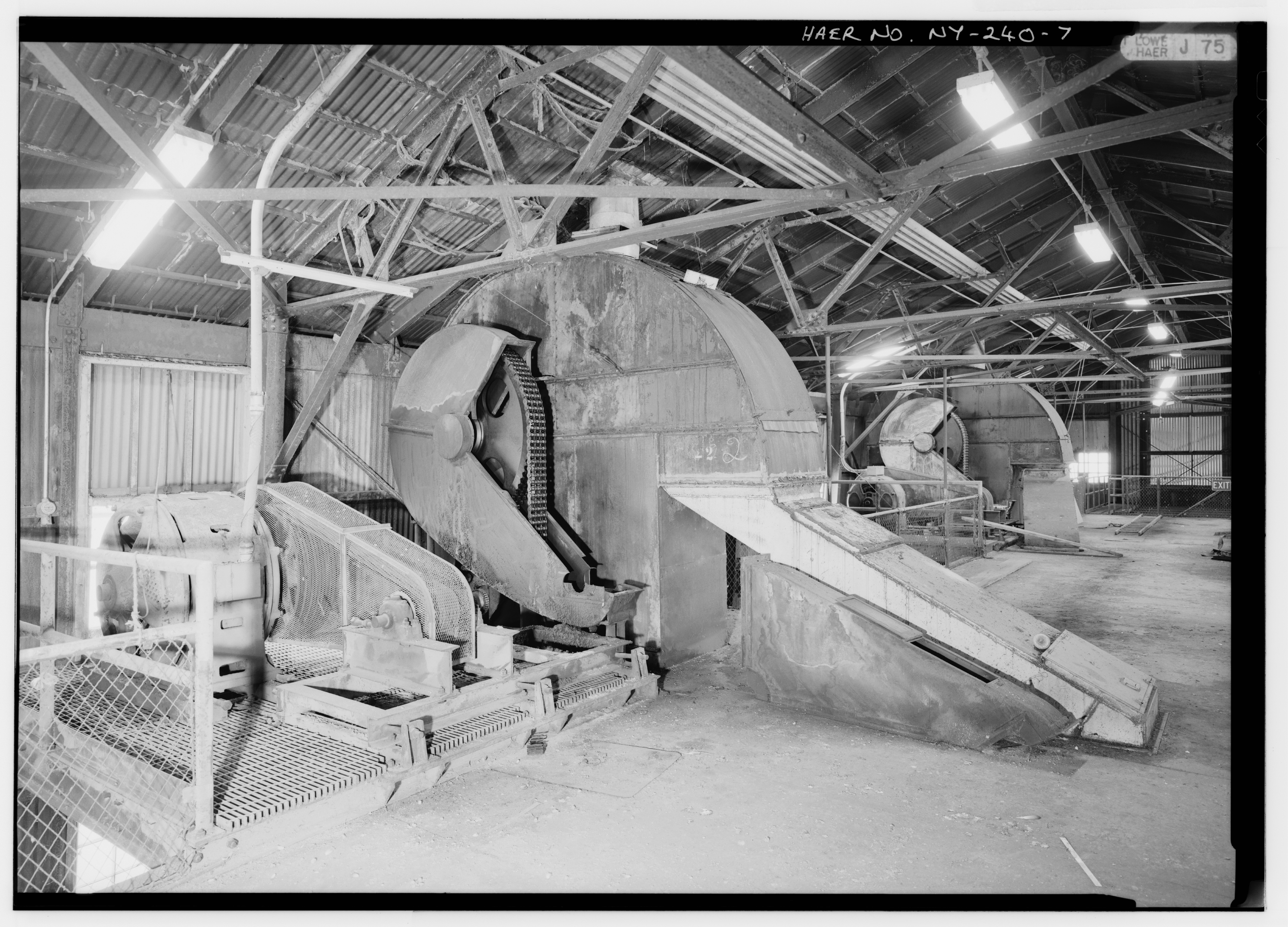
Detail of Westinghouse electric motor

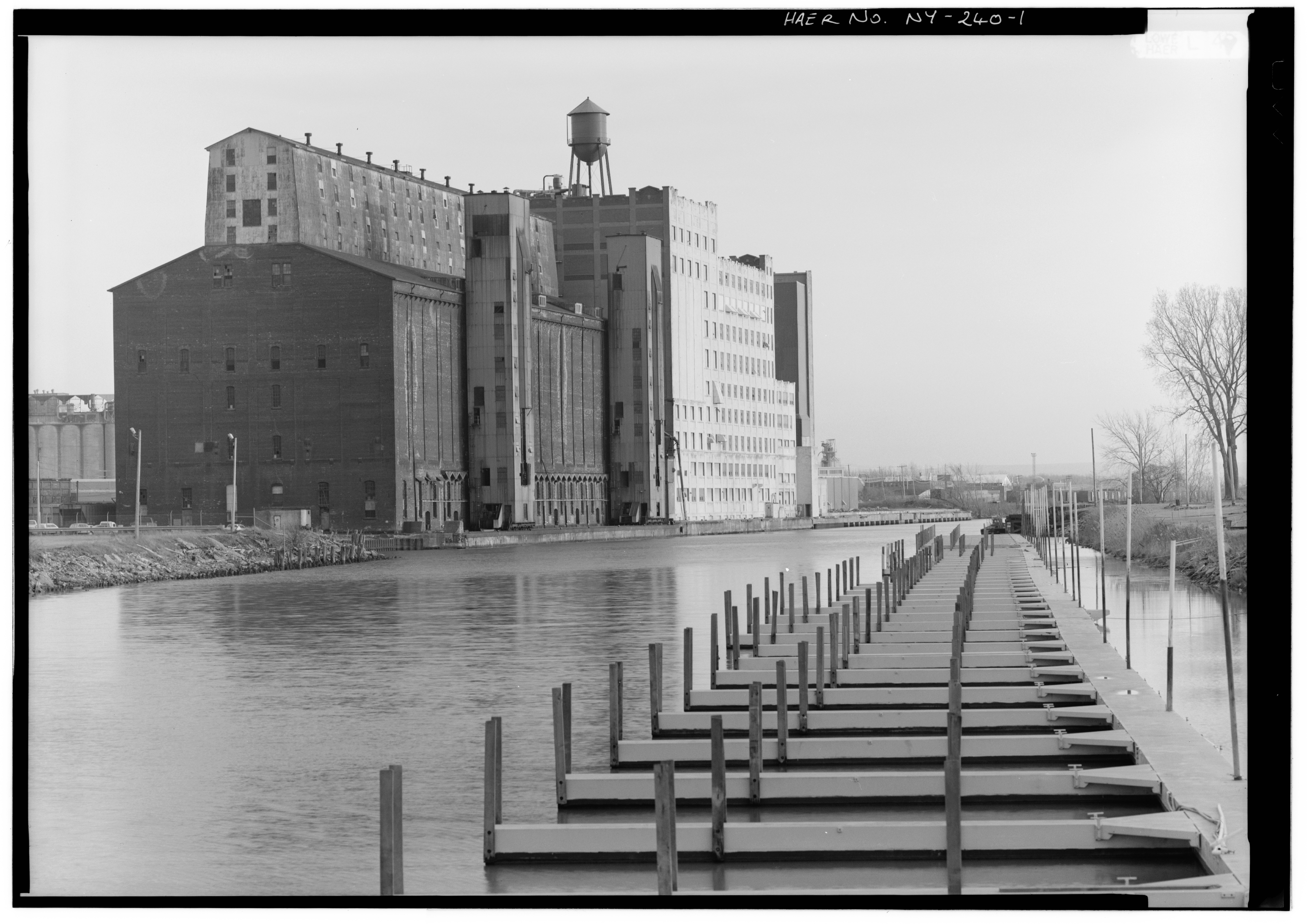
Great Northern (mutual) elevator, looking south

Survey cross section

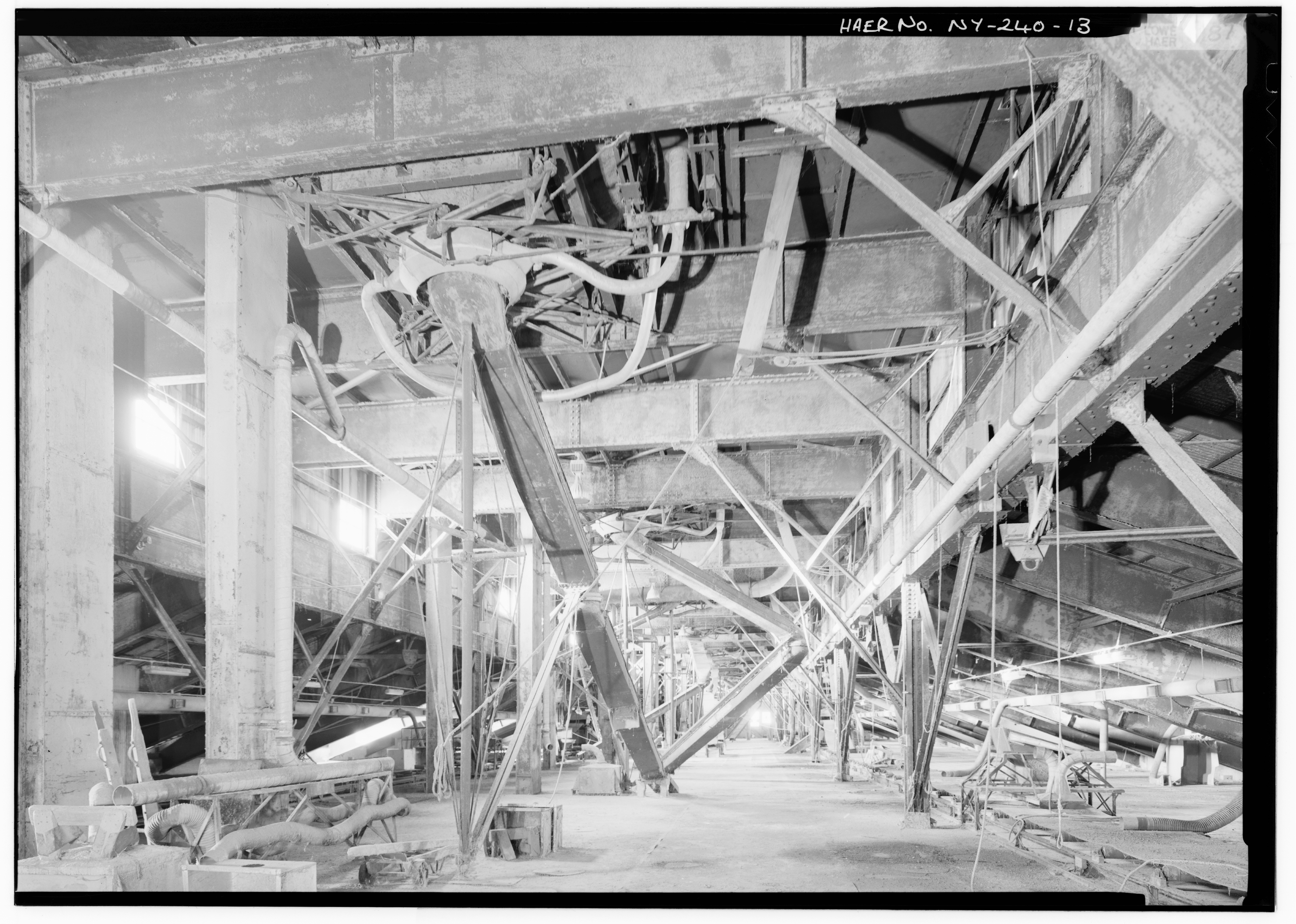
Distribution level, looking north

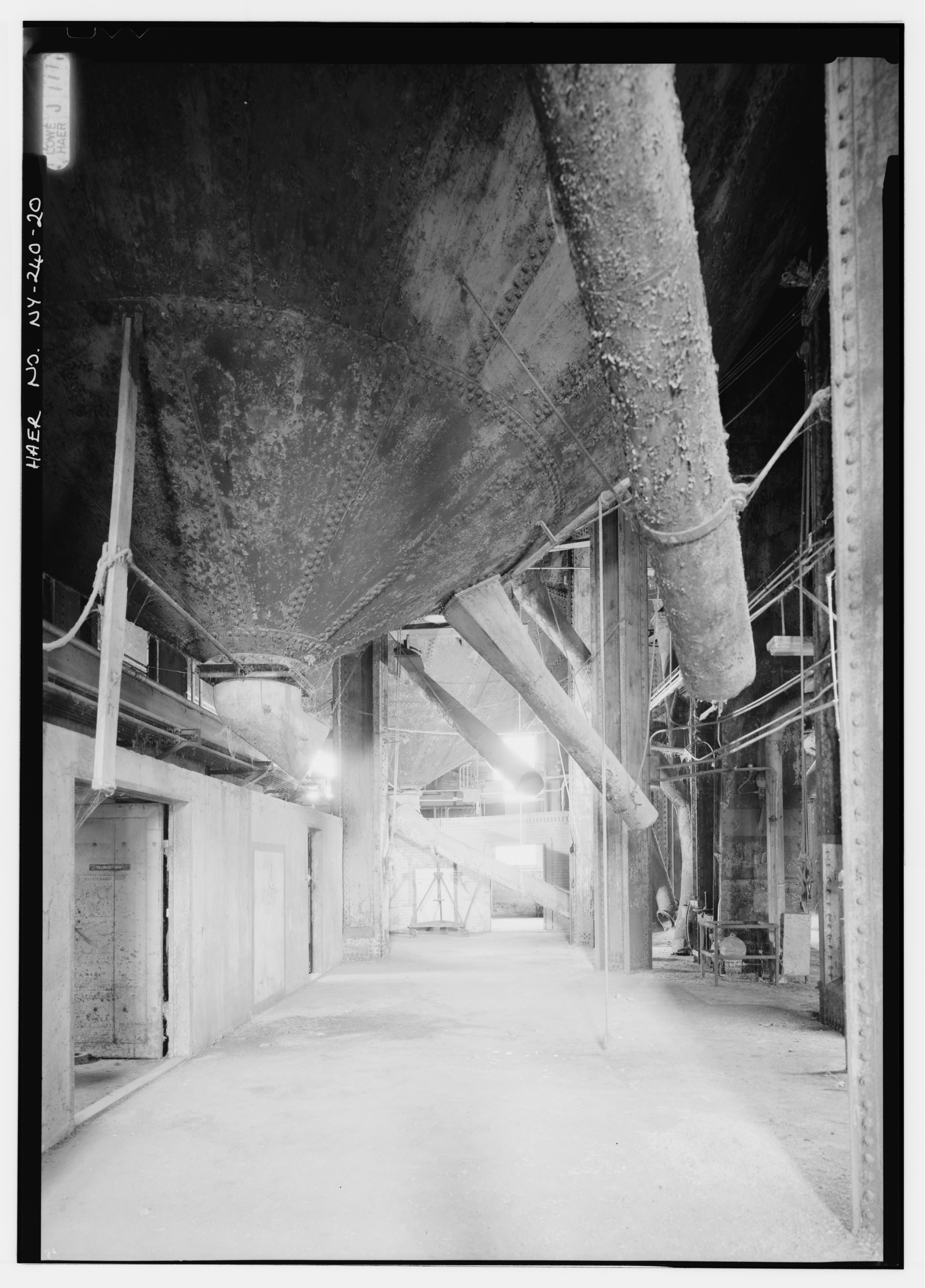
Basement level, bottom of main bins

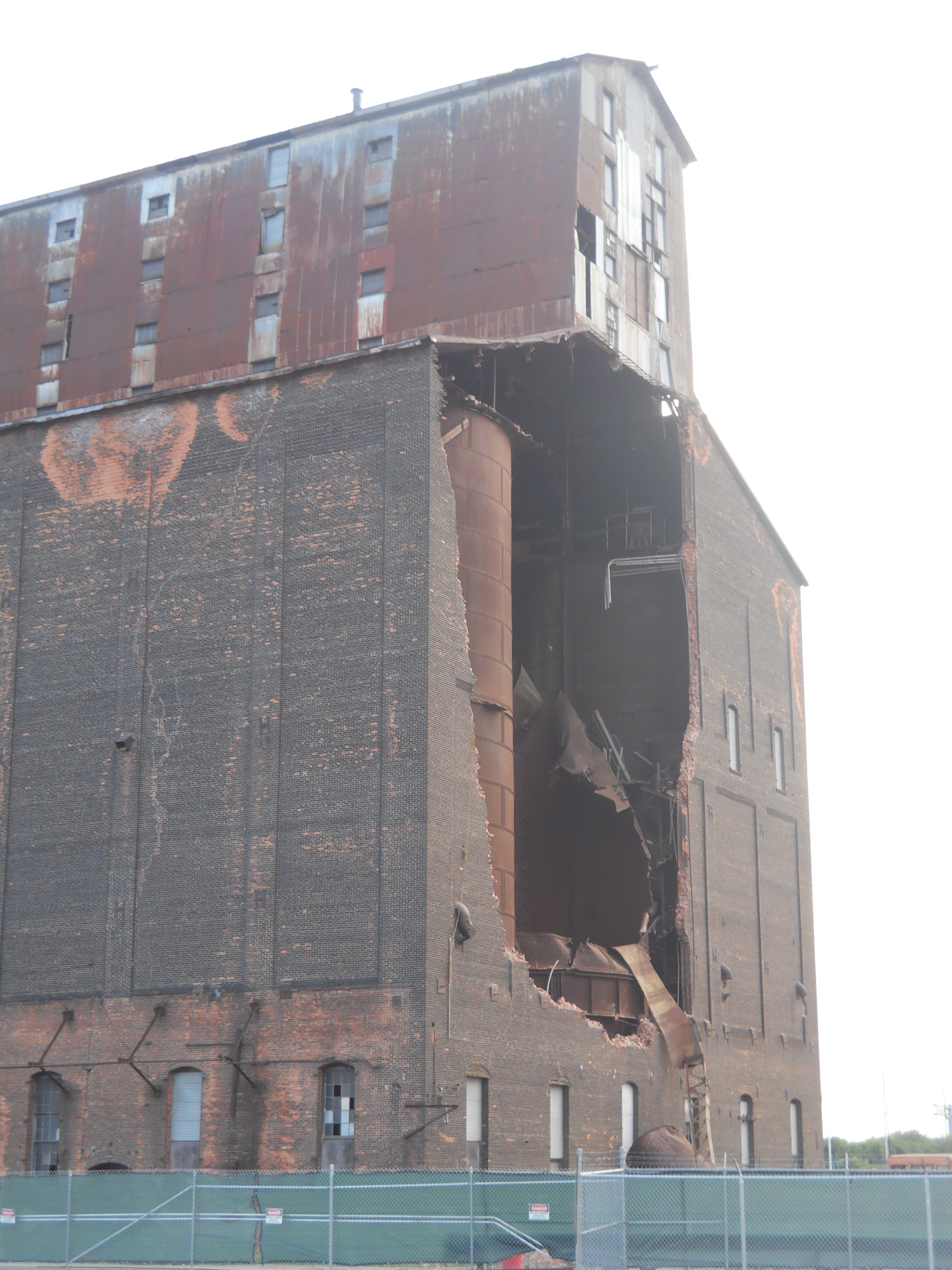
September 17, 2022 Saturday. This view shows the North face the day after demolition crews used a shear to rip apart one of the exposed metal bins.

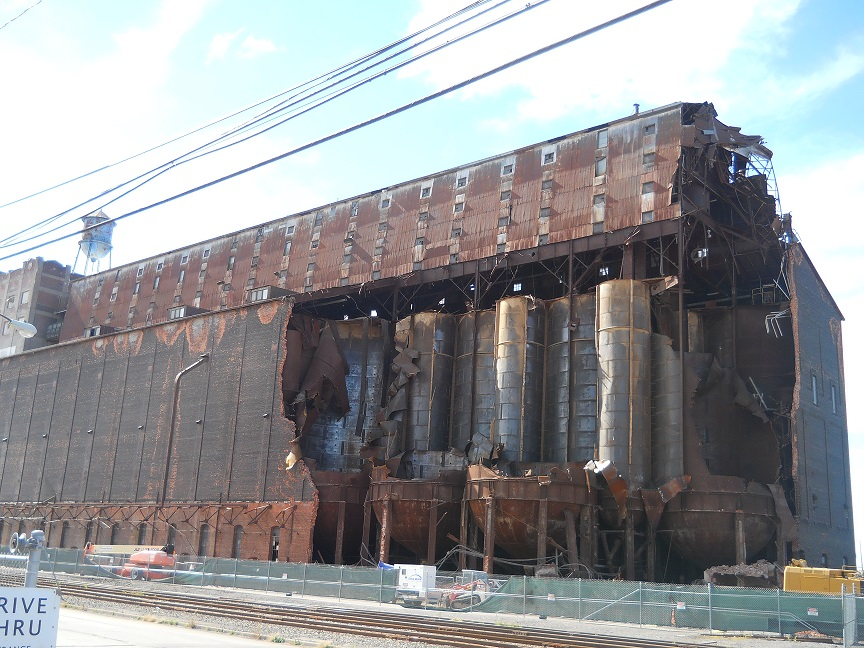
Great Northern Grain Elevator Silo on 2 October 2022 after two weeks of demolition work.
