= Sheridan Flouring Mills, Inc. =

- U.S. National Register of Historic Places
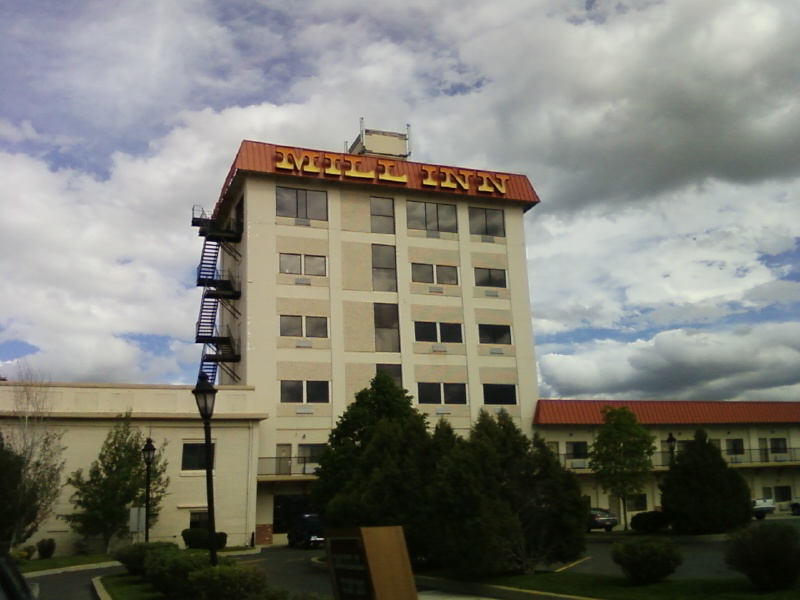

- Location within Wyoming Location within the United States
- Location: 2161 Coffeen Ave., Sheridan, Wyoming, United States 82801
- Coordinates: 44°46′28″N 106°56′28″W
- Built: 1921
- NRHP reference No.: 97001533
- Added to NRHP: December 8, 1997

The Sheridan Flouring Mills (the Mill Inn), is an industrial complex in Sheridan, Wyoming. The mills were a major component of the economy of north central Wyoming, providing collection, storage and milling of locally produced wheat and other grains into flour and other milled products. The mill was established by Captain Scott W. Snively in the early 1890s. The Sheridan Milling and Manufacturing Company was sold to J.W. Denio in 1903, who operated the mill on Broadway Avenue near downtown Sheridan. A catastrophic fire destroyed that mill in 1919, resulting in the purchase of a new location on Coffeen Avenue and construction of a much larger mill.

The present complex was built in 1920-21 for J.W. Denio by Ballinger and McAllister of Bloomington, Illinois. It consists of a reinforced concrete mill building with a long two-story wing and a more compact six-story section, adjoined by a reinforced concrete grain elevator with seven pairs of grain tanks. The elevator features a large logo with a cowboy on a bucking horse and the legend "Best Out West Enriched Flour, Tomahawk Feeds For Livestock and Poultry, Sheridan Flouring Mills, Inc." The elevator building is 144 feet (44 m) high, while the grain tanks are 110 feet (34 m) high. The mill therefore dominates the skyline of Sheridan.

The mill was purchased by Nebraska Consolidated Mills Company in 1963, the firm that became Con-Agra in 1971. The mill was upgraded in 1967, but closed in 1972. In 1974 a local corporation purchased the mill and converted it into a hotel in 1977-1978. As part of the hotel renovation, the interior partitions were removed from the mill building and new windows were installed, partially closing the openings with masonry.

The grain elevators had a capacity in the 1930s of 410,000 bushels of grain. They are now abandoned and their machinery has been removed. The mill's products included wheat cereal and biscuit, doughnut, waffle and pancake flour, marketed as "Best Out West." Animal feed products were sold under the "Tomahawk" brand. The mill employed a baker to test the production by baking bread twice a day.

The mill had a rail connection via a spur line of the Chicago, Burlington and Quincy Railroad. The tracks were removed with the development of the Sugarland commercial district.
