= Montana Elevator Co. =

American farmer cooperative

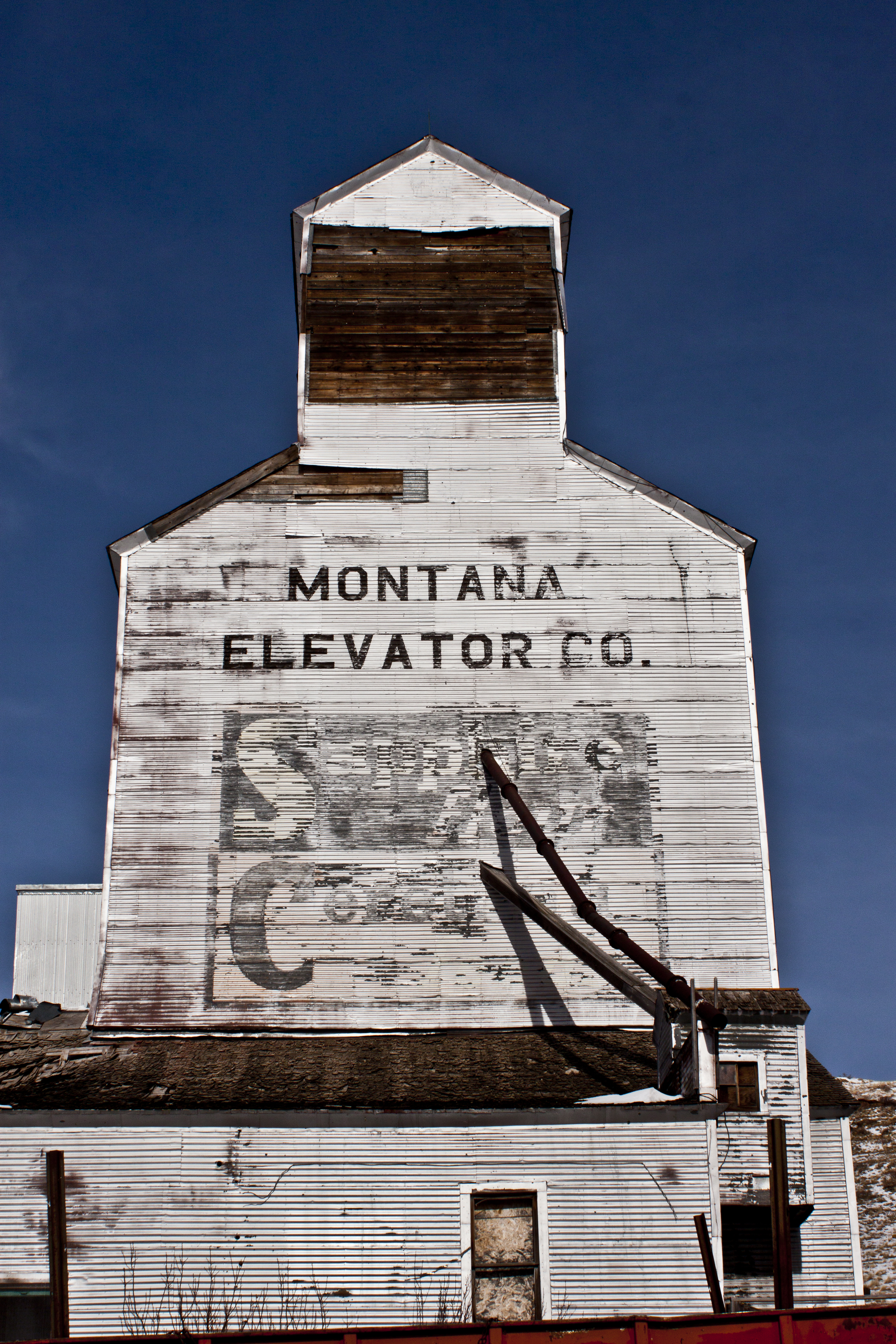
- Industry: Agriculture
- Founded: 1904
- Headquarters: Montana, United States
- Products: Grain buying

The Montana Elevator Co., was founded in 1904 as a wheat farmer co-operatives for Montana with their first elevator in Lewistown, Montana built in 1904. A few elevators remain across the state although they are long abandoned.
