= Saint Paul Municipal Grain Terminal =

- U.S. National Register of Historic Places
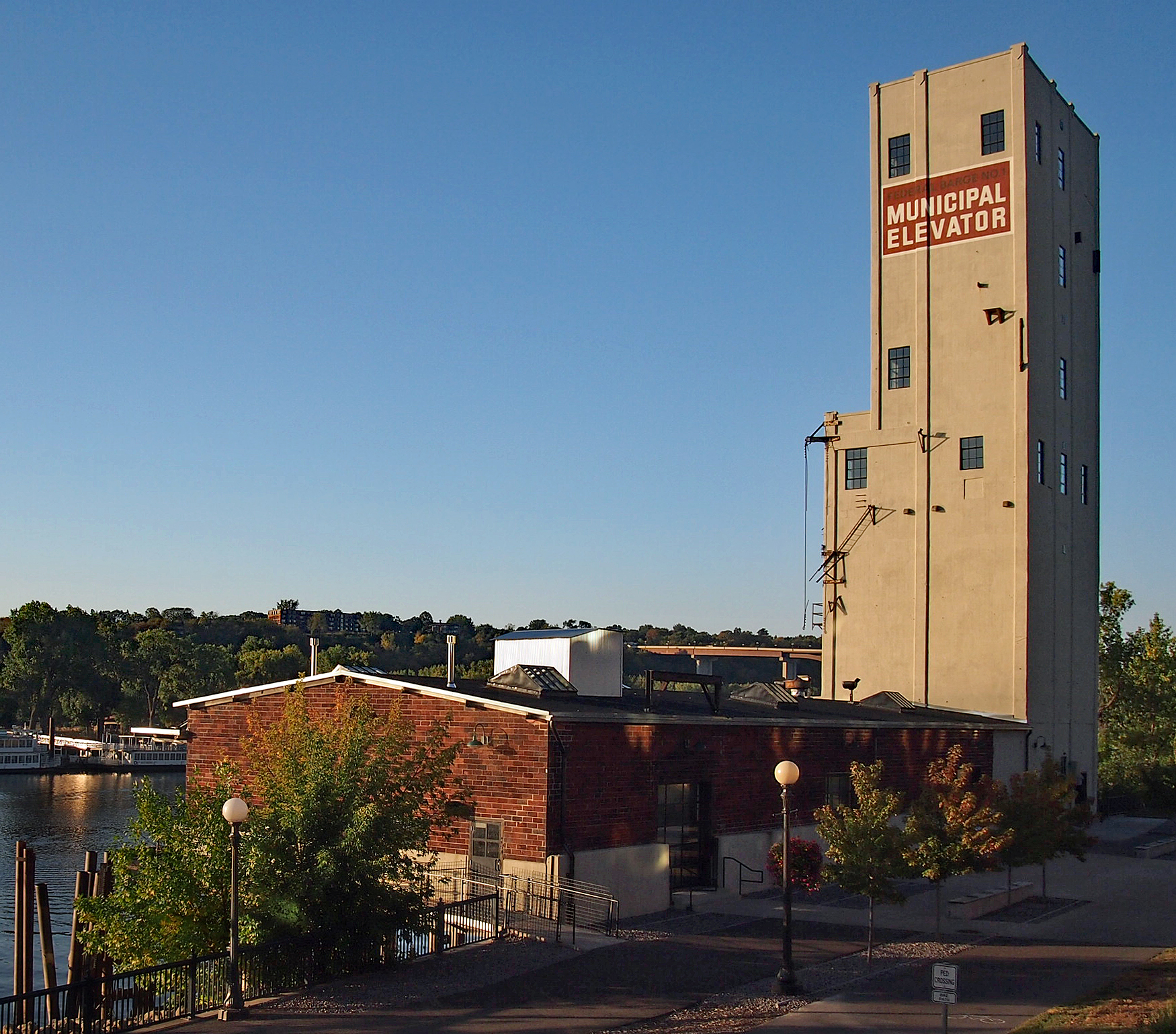
- The Saint Paul Municipal Grain Terminal from the northeast

- Location within Minnesota Location within the United States
- Location: 266 Old Shepard Road; Saint Paul, Minnesota
- Coordinates: 44°56′20″N 93°6′00″W
- Built: 1927–1931
- MPS: Grain Elevator Design in Minnesota MPS
- NRHP reference No.: 04000721
- Added to NRHP: July 21, 2004

The Saint Paul Municipal Grain Terminal is a six-story grain elevator also known as the head house and sack house, and sits on piers over the Mississippi River in Saint Paul, Minnesota, United States. It was built between 1927 and 1931 as part of the Equity Cooperative Exchange and is a remnant of Saint Paul's early history as a Mississippi River port city. The Saint Paul Municipal Grain Terminal was added to the National Register of Historic Places in 2004.

== Historical grain terminal ==
The structure is nationally significant as the first successful grain terminal elevator owned and operated by a farm cooperative in the United States. At one time the facility included 90 grain silos, a small mill, the head house for loading grain onto barges and train cars, and the sack house for sacking milled flour.

Video from the Minnesota Historical Society

== Location ==
The Grain Terminal is located at 266 Old Shepard Road, Saint Paul, Minnesota. Renovated and renamed "City House," it is available to rent for meetings, events and gatherings.

Once slated for demolition and listed as one of the most endangered historic sites in Minnesota, the municipal grain terminal on the Upper Landing now serves as a unique park pavilion, interpretive center and event venue. It is now called City House, as it was during the height of the farmers’ cooperative movement of the 1920 and 30s.

In 2001, plans to redevelop the Upper Landing – a former industrial site – were stalled due to several issues, including the dilapidated state of the grain terminal complex. To resolve this and other key issues, the Riverfront Corporation formed a task force, which included representatives from the Upper Landing's master developer Centex, the city, the Port Authority and surrounding neighborhoods, plus historians and preservationists. With regard to the grain terminal, the task force acknowledged that the buildings were historically significant and should be saved if possible, but also noted that the site could not be held indefinitely in its deteriorated condition.

To gather ideas and garner support for rehabilitating the grain terminal buildings, the Riverfront Corporation created the 2002 WHAZIT! Contest – a design competition that brought in over 200 ideas from across the U.S. and 13 foreign countries. The Saint Paul City Council asked the city, Riverfront Corporation staff, Centex and the Port Authority to review the entries in order to find the most appropriate and viable ideas.

After restaurant plans failed to materialize, the city, Riverfront Corporation and stakeholders worked to develop and finance redevelopment of the site as a park pavilion, trail head, interpretive center and event venue. The Riverfront Corporation wrote a successful request for a $1 million federal TEA-21 grant for building renovation. Additional funding for the project came from State of Minnesota bonding, Saint Paul Housing and Redevelopment Authority, Centex, Minnesota DEED, and Saint Paul Cultural STAR grant. The Riverfront Corporation secured funds from The CHS Foundation, Mississippi River Fund, The McKnight Foundation through Historic Saint Paul, and Saint Paul Cultural STAR to develop historic themes and exhibits for the buildings. Overall building redevelopment and exhibit costs were $3,127,500. The award-winning architectural firm Meyer Sherer Rockcastle served as the architect for the City House project.

Based on its national significance in the farmers' cooperative movement and its importance in the history of shipping on the river, the property was listed on the National Register of Historic Places in 2004.

Today, City House is managed by Saint Paul Parks and Recreation and is open from dawn to dusk. Cantilevered out over the Mississippi River, the complex offers expansive views of the river valley and the downtown skyline.
