= List of National Historic Sites of Canada in Saskatchewan =

This is a list of National Historic Sites (French: Lieux historiques nationaux) in the province of Saskatchewan. As of July 2021, there were 49 National Historic Sites designated in Saskatchewan, 10 of which are administered by Parks Canada (identified below by the beaver icon).

Numerous National Historic Events also occurred in Saskatchewan, and are identified at places associated with them, using the same style of federal plaque which marks National Historic Sites. Several National Historic Persons are commemorated throughout the province in the same way. The markers do not indicate which designation—a Site, Event, or Person—a subject has been given. The Rideau Canal is a Site, for example, while the Welland Canal is an Event. The cairn and plaque to John Macdonell does not refer to a National Historic Person, but is erected because his home, Glengarry House, is a National Historic Site. Similarly, the plaque to John Guy officially marks not a Person, but an Event—the Landing of John Guy.

This list uses names designated by the national Historic Sites and Monuments Board, which may differ from other names for these sites.

== National Historic Sites ==
Site	Date(s)	Designated	Location	Description	Image
Addison Sod House	1911 (completed)	2003	Kindersley; 51°28′0″N 109°10′0″W	A well-preserved and rare surviving example of a sod building, which was an important prairie form of construction and used extensively in the tall-grass regions	
Batoche	1872 (establishment)	1923	Batoche; 52°45′14.81″N 106°6′42.3″W	A Métis community and the site of 1885 Battle of Batoche; commemorates both the North-West Rebellion and Métis river lot land use patterns	1885 photograph of the commencement of hostilities at the Battle of Batoche
Battle of Cut Knife Hill	1885 (battle)	1923	Cut Knife; 52°50′22″N 108°57′47″W	Site where an attack during the North-West Rebellion by 300 government troops was repulsed by members of the Poundmaker Cree Nation, led by Poundmaker	Circa 1885 lithograph of a birds-eye view of the Battle of Cut Knife Hill
Battle of Duck Lake	1885 (battle)	1924	Duck Lake; 52°49′27″N 106°16′27″W	A 12-hectare (30-acre) grassy lot that served as the site of the first battle of the North-West Rebellion, considered an important victory for the Métis	
Battle of Tourond's Coulee / Fish Creek	1885 (battle)	1923	Fish Creek; 52°32′25.9″N 106°8′57.18″W	The 36-hectare (89-acre) site of a battle between Middleton's North West Field Force and Gabriel Dumont's Métis and First Nations forces; a psychological victory for the Métis during the North-West Rebellion	Hillcrest above Fish Creek Ravine
Battleford Court House	1909 (completed)	1981	Battleford; 52°44′0″N 108°19′0″W	A three-storey square brick and limestone court house; representative of the public buildings erected by the provincial government following the creation of the Province of Saskatchewan in 1905	Exterior view of the Battleford Court House
Biggar Railway Station (Grand Trunk Pacific)	1910 (completed)	1976	Biggar; 52°3′13″N 107°59′11″W	A one-and-a-half-storey, timber-frame train station that commemorates the Grand Trunk Pacific Railway's role in the development of Western Canada and the distinctive contribution its stations made to Canada's architectural heritage	Exterior view of the Biggar Railway Station
Canadian Bank of Commerce	1907 (completed)	1976	Watson; 52°7′44″N 104°31′27″W	A two-storey, wood-frame bank with neoclassical stylings, now housing the local museum; the largest surviving example of the prefabricated banks erected in railway towns across the prairies, and representative of the expansion of the country's large banks into Western Canada	Exterior view of the Bank of Commerce building in Watson
Fort Carlton	1810 (established)	1976	Duck Lake; 52°49′4.95″N 106°29′47.35″W	The site of forts built in 1810, 1845 and 1855 (with foundations and archaeological remains existing from the 1855 fort); served as a strategically placed Hudson's Bay Company fort and a North-West Mounted Police post, and the location where Treaty 6 was signed	Fortifications of Carlton House
Claybank Brick Plant	1912 (established)	1994	Claybank; 50°3′0″N 105°14′0″W	A former industrial complex used for the manufacture of clay bricks from 1914 to 1989; key structures and brick-making equipment of the 1912-1937 period remain remarkably intact	
College Building	1912 (original building completed)	2001	Saskatoon; 52°8′12″N 106°37′51″W	The centrepiece of the best grouping of Collegiate Gothic university buildings in Canada, surrounding a grassy oval known as "The Bowl"; the earliest and most important building on the University of Saskatchewan campus	Front facade of the College Building
Cumberland House	1774 (established)	1924	Cumberland House; 53°57′35″N 102°15′53″W	The Hudson's Bay Company's first inland fur-trading post, around which Saskatchewan's oldest permanent settlement was founded by Samuel Hearne; only visible remnant today is a stone-walled 1890s gunpowder house	
Cypress Hills Massacre	1873 (massacre)	1964	Maple Creek; 49°33′1.75″N 109°53′19.76″W	The site where American traders along with local Métis attacked a Nakoda camp and killed a number of inhabitants; one of the first major tests of Canada's law enforcement policies in Western Canada	Distant view of the valley in which the Cypress Hills Massacre occurred
Doukhobor Dugout House	1899 (completed)	2008	Blaine Lake; 52°45′17″N 106°43′28″W	One of many such dugout houses constructed by Doukhobors upon arrival in Canada, and a shelter type used by many settlers of various ethnicities upon their arrival on the prairies; the only known partially surviving example of this type of shelter	
Doukhobors at Veregin	1905 (established)	2006	Veregin; 51°35′0″N 102°4′53″W	The administrative, distribution and spiritual centre for the Doukhobor settlements in the region, the focus of which is a large prayer house	Exterior view of the Veregin Prayer House
Esterhazy Flour Mill	1907 (completed)	2009	Esterhazy; 50°39′11″N 102°4′16″W	A rare and complete flour milling complex, of the type that was crucial to the grain industry in Saskatchewan and which contributed to the development of farming communities such as Esterhazy	Exterior view of the flour mill in winter
Forestry Farm Park and Zoo	1913 (established)	1990	Saskatoon; 52°9′30″N 106°35′3″W	Opened as a tree nursery station and model farm under the federal Department of the Interior in order to develop new and scientific farming methods; now a municipal zoo	Superintendent's residence at the Forestry Farm Park and Zoo
Former Muscowequan Indian Residential School	1931 (built); 1889-1997 (school operated)	July 8, 2021	Lestock	The last standing Indian boarding school in Saskatchewan, and among the last to close in the country	
Former Prince Albert City Hall	1893 (completed)	1984	Prince Albert; 53°12′7″N 105°45′31″W	Former city hall with bell tower, now serving as an arts centre; one of the few remaining 19th-century town halls on the Canadian Prairies, and a reflection of the town's status and optimism at the time of the hall's construction	Former Prince Albert, Saskatchewan city hall.
Fort à la Corne	1753 (established)	1926	Kinistino; 53°9′0″N 104°48′0″W	Site near where Louis de la Corne built Fort St. Louis in 1753, the furthest western point of New France; subsequently the site of several fur trade posts, including a post established in 1846 by the Hudson's Bay Company and named after Corne	
Fort Battleford	1876 (established)	1923	Battleford; 52°43′36.58″N 108°17′42.32″W	An early North-West Mounted Police post, representative of the role of the police force in the 1876 to 1885 period and specifically of the role played by the force during the North-West Rebellion	Fort Battleford as seen from a distance
Fort Espérance	1785 (established)	1944	Rocanville; 50°29′32″N 101°34′39″W	An archaeological site believed to contain the remains of two late 18th- and early 19th-century fur trade forts; the earliest and most permanent of the North West Company's posts related to the Assiniboine River fur trade	
Fort Livingstone	1874 (established)	1923	Pelly; 51.899444°N 101.962222°W	An archaeological site at the location of the former capital of the North-West Territories (1876-1877) and which once housed the first North-West Mounted Police barracks in Western Canada	1877 sketch of Fort Livingstone
Fort Pelly	1856 (established)	1953	Pelly; 51°46′35″N 101°59′51″W	An archaeological site on the site of the Hudson's Bay Company fur trade post located at the elbow of the Assiniboine River near the Swan River; the headquarters of the company's Swan River District for almost 50 years	
Fort Pitt	1829 (established)	1954	Fort Pitt Provincial Park; 53°39′1″N 109°45′6″W	An archaeological site containing the remains of two Hudson's Bay Company forts; the second fort was burned during the North-West Rebellion by Big Bear's followers after the North-West Mounted Police had withdrawn to Battleford	
Fort Qu'Appelle	1864 (established)	1953	Fort Qu'Appelle; 50°46′18″N 103°47′51″W	Originally a major Hudson's Bay Company provision post for the southern Prairies surrounded by a log palisade; now located at the town's northern edge, with one remaining one original building that serves as a museum	Circa 1914 postcard of the one remaining fort building, now the museum
Fort Walsh	1875 (established)	1924	Merryflat; 49°34′21.89″N 109°52′53.24″W	A fort which served as headquarters of the North-West Mounted Police from 1878 to 1882	1878 photograph of NWMP members at Fort Walsh
Frenchman Butte	1885 (battle)	1929	Frenchman Butte; 53°37′38″N 109°34′33″W	The site where the Wood Cree and the Alberta Field Force waged the Battle of Frenchman's Butte on May 28, 1885, as part of the North-West Rebellion	
Government House	1891 (completed)	1968	Regina; 50°27′14″N 104°38′52″W	The former residence of the Lieutenant Governor of the North-West Territories and now an event venue, museum and offices for the Lieutenant Governor of Saskatchewan; one of the few surviving territorial government buildings	Government House
Gravelbourg Ecclesiastical Buildings	1919 (Cathedral completed)	1995	Gravelbourg; 49°52′20″N 106°33′26″W	A cathedral, bishop's residence and convent; symbolic of the efforts of the Roman Catholic Church in the late 19th and early 20th centuries to colonize Western Canada with French Canadians	
Gray Burial Site	3000 BCE (c.)	1973	Swift Current; 50°20′38″N 107°52′43″W	One of oldest burial sites on the Prairies and a rare example of an Aboriginal burial ground; contains 87 burials with remains of about 154 individuals, and display a remarkable degree of variation in burial techniques	
Holy Trinity Church	1860 (completed)	1970	Stanley Mission; 55°25′3″N 104°33′2″W	A large, wooden church on a rocky point on the banks of the Churchill River, the spire of which can be seen for a great distance against the forest backdrop; the oldest existing building in Saskatchewan, and the oldest church west of the Red River	Front facade with spire of Holy Trinity
Humboldt Post Office	1912 (completed)	1977	Humboldt; 52°11′56″N 105°7′22″W	A Romanesque Revival-style former post office which remains, more than a century after construction, one of the dominant buildings on Main Street and a landmark in the town; representative of the extension of federal services across the west in the early 20th century	Exterior view of the Humboldt Post Office
Île-à-la-Crosse	1775 (trading post established)	1954	Île-à-la-Crosse; 55°27′0″N 107°53′0″W	A pre-contact gathering place for Aboriginal peoples, where Louis Primeau established a trading post in 1775; the site served as an important provision depot for the North West Company and the Hudson's Bay Company established its first post here in 1799	
John and Olive Diefenbaker Museum	1912 (built); 1947 (Diefenbaker purchase)	2018	Prince Albert; 53.196007°N 105.761981°W	Former home of Prime Minister John Diefenbaker and his second wife, Olive, now a museum	
Keyhole Castle	1913 (completed)	1975	Prince Albert; 53°11′43″N 105°45′6″W	A 2 1/2-storey mansion in the Queen Anne Revival-style, the name of which derives from the shape of the windows in its corner tower; exemplifies the eclecticism and individualism in late 19th- and early 20th-century architecture, and represents the optimism of the early citizens of this community	
Last Mountain Lake Bird Sanctuary	1887 (established)	1987	Last Mountain Valley; 51°19′52.52″N 105°14′2.72″W	On the recommendation of Edgar Dewdney, Lieutenant-Governor of the North-West Territories, this sanctuary located at the northern end of Last Mountain Lake was set aside in 1887 for the protection of wildfowl, the first such reserve on the continent	
Marr Residence	1884	2016	Saskatoon; 52.118640°N 106.663290°W	Part of the area's first European settlement and a temperance colonization effort; field hospital during the North-West Rebellion	Marr Residence in Saskatoon
Melville Railway Station	1908	2016	Melville; 50.9263°N 102.8072°W	Major Grand Trunk Pacific Railway station helped settle and develop the West	
Montgomery Place	1945	2016	Saskatoon; 52.112001°N 106.727965°W	A post-World War II veterans community which became a commemorative landscape and historic district	
Moose Jaw Court House	1909 (completed)	1981	Moose Jaw; 50°23′37″N 105°32′14″W	A brick court house with Beaux-Arts design, Neoclassical detailing and Bedford stone trim; symbolic of the new provincial justice system of Saskatchewan of 1908, and the only court house in the province designed by Pearson and Darling	
Motherwell Homestead	1882 (established)	1966	Abernethy; 50°43′8″N 103°25′30″W	A 3.59-hectare (8.9-acre) farmstead with a two-storey, stone farmhouse; noted for its associations with William Richard Motherwell and illustrative of a prairie homestead from the Western Canada settlement period	
Next of Kin Memorial Avenue	1923 (completed)	1992	Saskatoon; 52°8′49″N 106°39′29″W	A 0.7-kilometre (0.43 mi)-long lane beginning at a pair of stone pedestals, flanked on either side by a single row of mature elm trees and commemorative bronze plaques, and ending in a paved circle surrounding a stone memorial cairn; an excellent example of the "Roads of Remembrance" phenomenon which developed to honour the dead of the First World War	View looking down tree-lined Next of Kin Memorial Avenue
Old Government House / Saint-Charles Scholasticate	1879 (completed)	1973	Battleford; 52°42′43″N 108°18′29″W	The site of the first Government House of the (then) North-West Territories; the house was destroyed by fire in 2003	1870s photo of old government house
Saskatchewan Legislative Building and Grounds	1912 (completed)	2005	Regina; 50°25′57″N 104°36′54″W	A buff-coloured limestone legislative building on the shores of Lake Wascana which, along with its grounds, represents one of the best examples of Beaux-Arts and City Beautiful design in Canada; a highly visible symbol of the province, and one which represents the ambition and drive of the people of Saskatchewan	The front entrance and dome of the Saskatchewan Legislative Building
Saskatoon Railway Station (Canadian Pacific)	1908 (completed)	1976	Saskatoon; 52°7′56″N 106°40′16″W	A two-storey, Château-style railway station; commemorates the Canadian Pacific Railway and the smaller stations built by the line during its prosperous years	Exterior view of the Saskatoon railway station in winter
Seager Wheeler's Maple Grove Farm	1898 (established)	1994	Rosthern; 52°40′25″N 106°13′5″W	A 17-hectare (42-acre) farmstead established by farmer, agronomist and pioneering seed breeder Seager Wheeler; representative of a typical prairie farm of the 1898-1940 era, and reflective of Seager's work during that era	
Steele Narrows	1885 (battle)	1950	Loon Lake; 54°2′26″N 109°18′34″W	The site of the last engagement of the North-West Rebellion; a cavalry troop led by Sam Steele overtook a party of Cree led by Wandering Spirit and Big Bear	
Wanuskewin	4000 BCE (c.)	1986	Corman Park; 52°13′25″N 106°35′42″W	Archaeological sites representing nearly 6000 years of the history of the Northern Plains peoples, located within a 57-hectare (140-acre) conservation area on the South Saskatchewan River	Wooden sign at entrance to Wanuskewin Heritage Park

== See also ==
- History of Saskatchewan
- List of historic places in Saskatchewan
- Heritage Property Act (Saskatchewan)
