= Five Roses =

Five Roses may refer to:

- Five Roses (album), by Miracle Fortress, 2007
- Five Roses Flour, a Canadian brand
