= Gray Burial Site =

Late Archaic period site in Saskatchewan, Canada

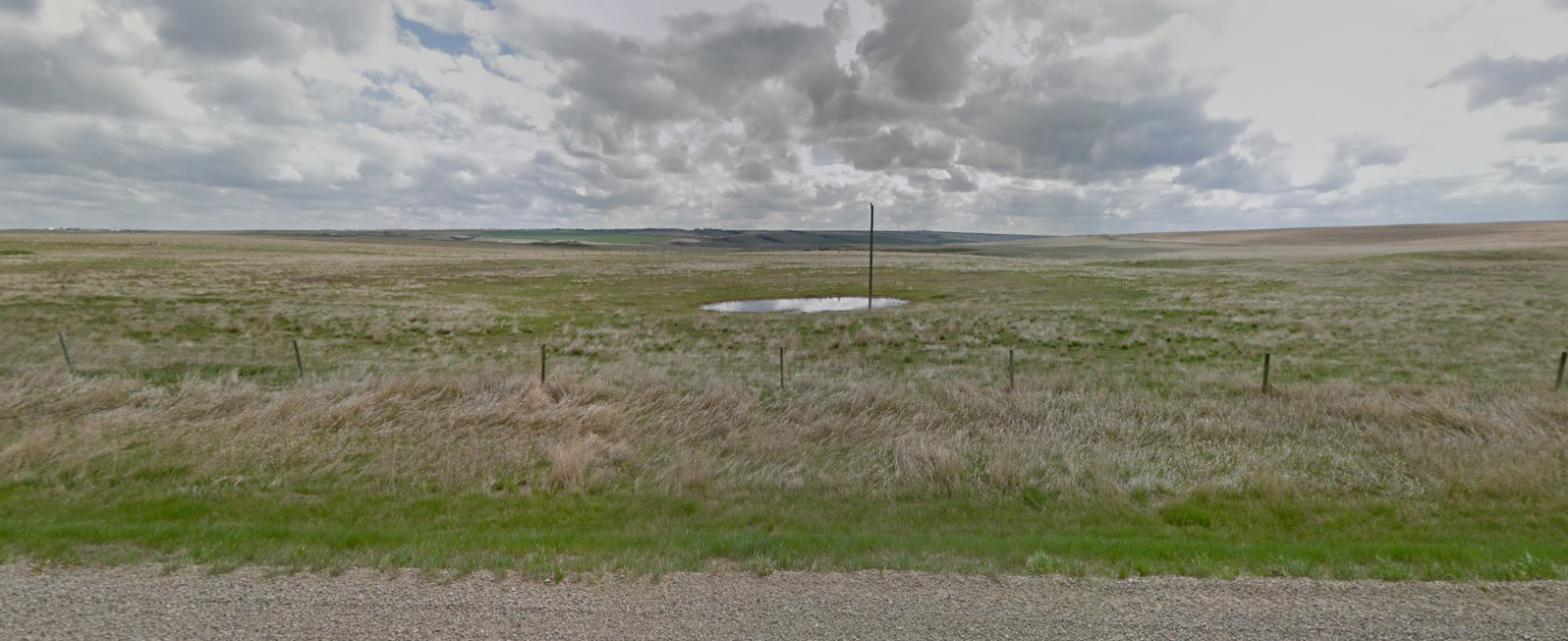
- Type: Burial grounds
- Location: Swift Current, Saskatchewan, Canada
- Coordinates: 50.3430°N 107.8785°W
- Founded: c. 3000 BC

National Historic Site of Canada
- Designated: November 15, 1973

Gray Burial Site is an Oxbow complex burial ground located near Swift Current, Saskatchewan. It is notable for being an Aboriginal burial ground located on the Canadian prairies and being one of the oldest sites of this type found.

== History ==
The site was discovered in 1963 on a farm near Swift Current, with archaeological work beginning in 1969. Later excavations uncovered remains of 304 bodies. The site was designated a National Historic Site of Canada in 1973, as it is one of the oldest indigenous burial grounds in the Canadian Prairies. In 2012, 87 burials with the remains of about 154 individuals had been identified.
