= John Mather (businessman) =

Canadian businessman

John Mather (29 October 1827 – 10 June 1907) was born in Scotland and became a prominent Canadian figure in the development of the District of Keewatin in what was then the Northwest Territories.

Mather was heavily involved in the lumber industry at Rat Portage in the 1880s. He also became vice president of the Lake of the Woods Milling Company in 1887 and oversaw the construction of the first flour mill.
