= Union Bank Building =

Skyscraper in the Exchange District of Winnipeg, Manitoba, Canada

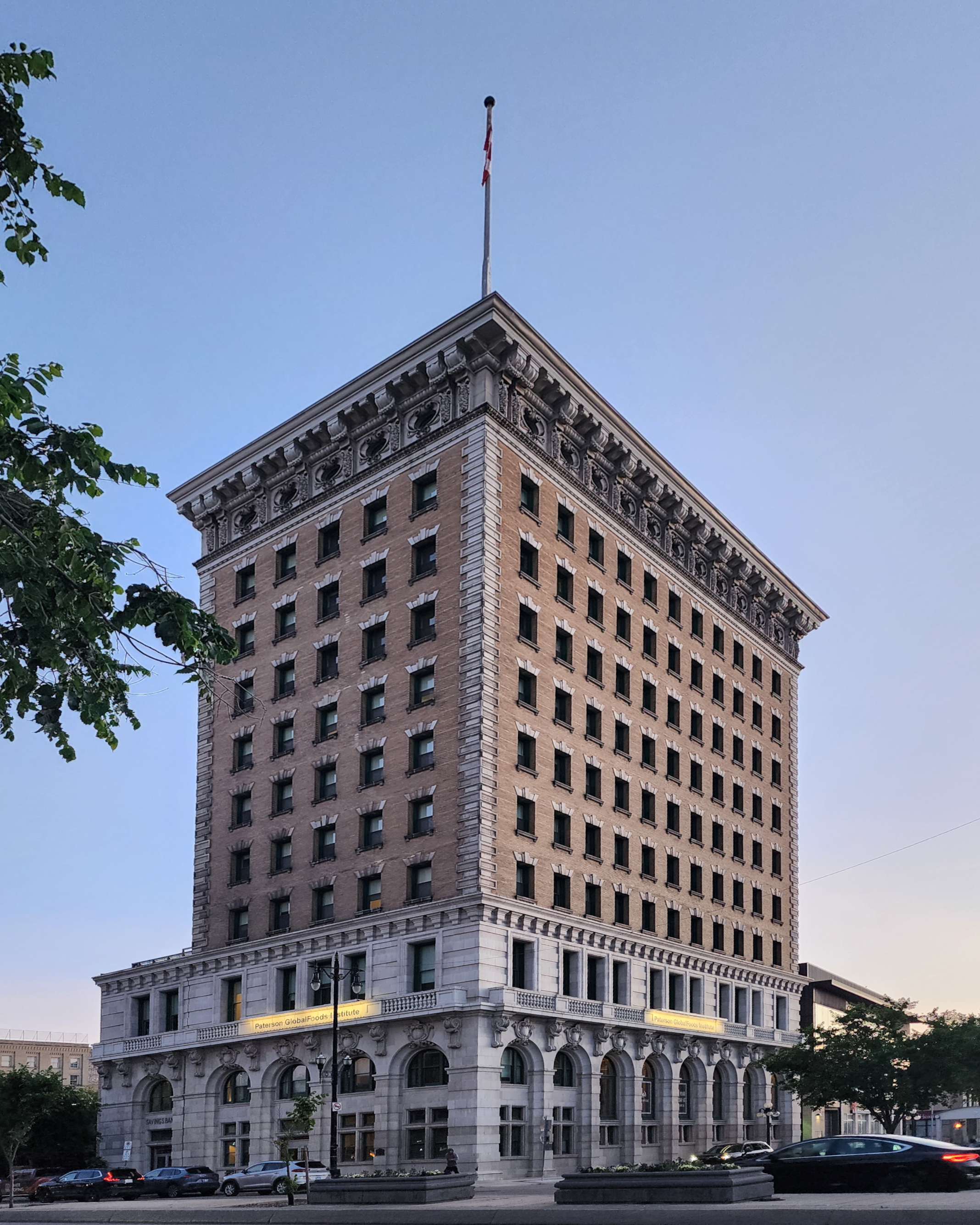
- Alternative names: Paterson Globalfoods Institute Royal Bank Building Royal Bank Tower

General information
- Architectural style: Classical palazzo
- Location: Exchange District, Winnipeg, Manitoba, 500–504 Main Street, Winnipeg, Canada
- Coordinates: 49.8988°N 97.1394°W
- Current tenants: Paterson GlobalFoods Institute, Red River College
- Construction started: 1903
- Completed: 1904
- Opened: November 1904
- Renovated: 2013
- Cost: $420,000
- Renovation cost: $34 million

Height
- Architectural: 47.58 meters (156.1 ft)

Technical details
- Floor count: 10 (plus mezzanine)

Design and construction
- Architecture firm: Pearson and Darling
- Main contractor: George A. Fuller Company; Thompson–Starrett Co.
- Designations

National Historic Site of Canada
- Official name: Former Union Bank Building / Annex National Historic Site of Canada
- Designated: September 22, 1996
- Reference no.: 1136

Municipally Designated Site
- Designation: Winnipeg Landmark Heritage Structure
- Recognized: July 18, 1995
- CRHP listing: January 29, 2008
- Recognition authority: City of Winnipeg
- ID: 8645

References
- Canada's Historic Places

The Union Bank Building (aka the Union Bank Tower or Former Union Bank Building and Annex), located in the Exchange District of Winnipeg, Manitoba, is the first skyscraper in Canada, once forming the northern end of Main Street's prestigious Banker's Row. It was designated a National Historic Site of Canada in 1997.

The 11-storey (including mezzanine) building towers over its neighbours at a height of 47.58 metres (156.1 ft). Beginning construction in 1903 and opening in November 1904, the Union Bank Tower was the tallest building in Winnipeg at its completion, beating the eight stories of the newly-built Merchants' Bank building (now demolished). At the time of opening, the top floor of Union Bank was the second-highest in the British Empire, just 1 metre (3.3 ft) below London's tallest building.

Union Bank Tower is the oldest surviving of Canada's tallest buildings to incorporate a steel skeleton structure that fully supports a light-weight, veneer 'curtain wall' facade—a design innovation that facilitated the proliferation of skyscrapers in the 20th century. The Merchants' Bank building proceeded it by several years in use of steel structure construction. Moreover, Union Bank Tower had the largest and fastest elevator in Western Canada and was the first building in the nation to introduce the modern concept of a general contractor to oversee construction.

Initially built for the Union Bank of Canada, it remained vacant for 18 years beginning in the late 1990s, until it was redeveloped into the Paterson GlobalFoods Institute and student housing for Red River College in 2013.

== Original construction ==
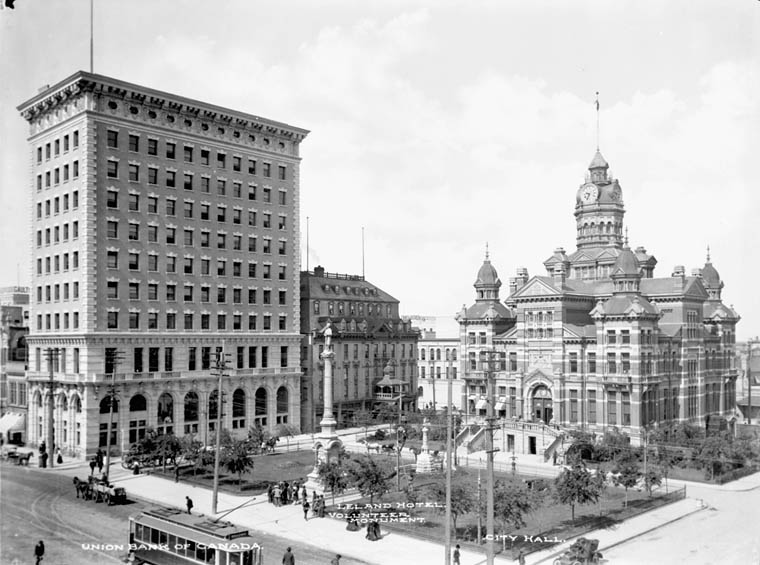
Union Bank Building c. 1900–1925

As an example of the Chicago architectural school, the building was constructed with a network of steel and reinforced concrete that provided support for the brick and terracotta walls. This technology was cutting edge for its time, as the previously-common building support system was that of wooden beams and posts or masonry. The steel framing accordingly increased the overall rigidity and fire resistance of the structure compared to its predecessors.

The structure is built on a floating platform base, its foundation being supported by large concrete caissons. At the time of its original construction, the building rose to 47.58 metres (156.1 ft) above grade, running 18.30 metres (60.0 ft) on Main Street, 33.55 metres (110.1 ft) along William Avenue, 24.71 metres (81.1 ft) at the rear, and 34.16 metres (112.1 ft) on its south side.

At the time, the spacious ground floor was to be used entirely as a banking room, including marble Ionic columns, patterned marble floor, coffered ceiling with moulded plaster elements. The rest of the building was divided into suites of offices, each with its own vault, telephone box, and lavatory; moreover, the building was to have three elevators.

Designed by two of Canada’s top architects, Frank Darling and John Andrew Pearson, the Union Bank Tower follows the classical palazzo model, one of two Beaux Arts-inspired forms used for early skyscrapers. The design is based on a classical column. The bottom two storeys form the base and are highly ornamented. The middle storeys form the body of the column and are less ornamented, and the upper level have similar embellishment to the ground floor.

== History ==
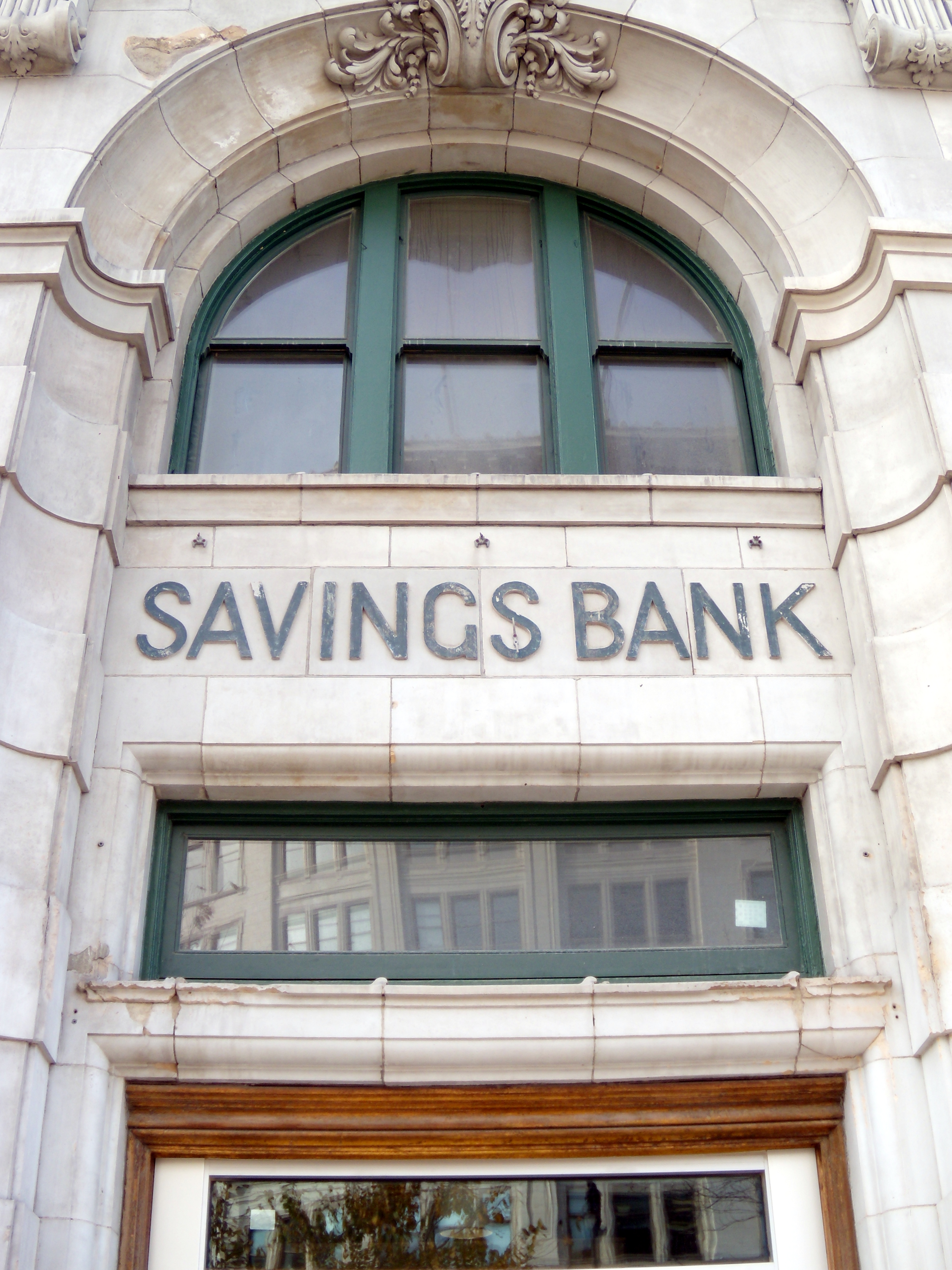
Savings Bank detail of Union Bank Building

Reflecting the central role played by finance in the expansion of the West from 1896 to 1914, the building began construction in 1903.

Designed by two of Canada’s top architects, Frank Darling and John Andrew Pearson, the Union Bank Tower is an example of the Chicago architectural style. With an initial construction cost of C$420,000, the building was built by two New York City construction firms: George A. Fuller Company and Thompson–Starrett Co. The frame of riveted interlocking girders was manufactured by Dominion Bridge of Montreal, and the ochre brick came from the Lac du Bonnet brickworks.

The building officially opened in November 1904. In 1921, a single-storey annex was added to the original 10-storey tower to accommodate the Bank's savings department.

The Royal Bank of Canada (RBC) took over the Union Bank in 1925, and operated out of the Union Bank Building until 1992. (The building served as the main branch for the Royal Bank in Winnipeg until 1966.) In 1992, the Royal Bank moved out of the building and to a new location at James Avenue and Main Street.

On September 22, 1997, the Government of Canada designated the building as a National Historic Site.

The building sat vacant for 18 years before being renovated, repurposed and opened as the Paterson GlobalFoods Institute of Red River College in 2013.

=== Paterson Globalfoods Institute ===
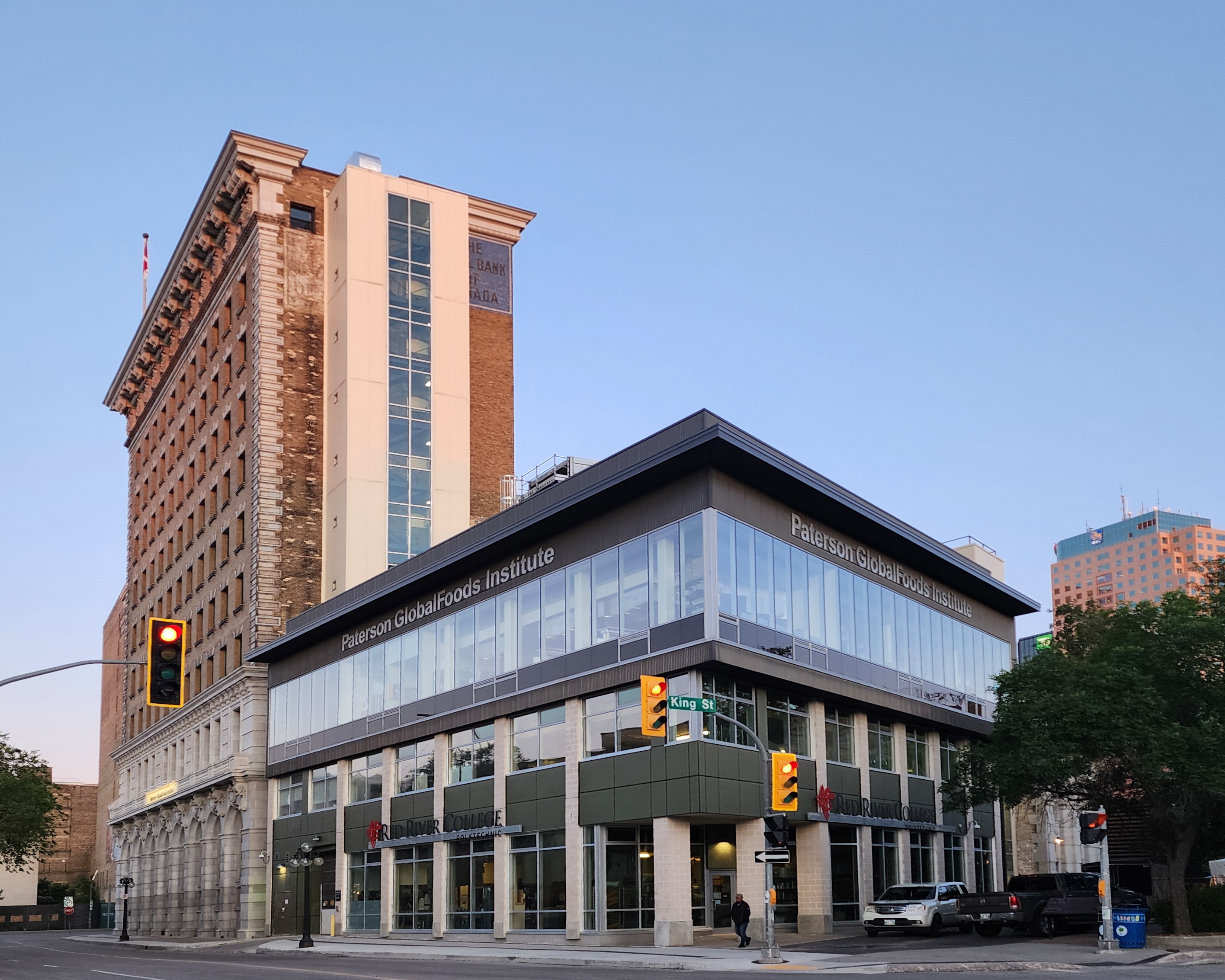
Paterson GlobalFoods addition

In May 2009, the Government of Canada pledged Red River College Polytechnic (RRC Polytech, then known as Red River College) with $9.5 million of funding to help reconstruct the Union Bank Building at the corner of Main Street and William Avenue in downtown Winnipeg to house the new Paterson GlobalFoods Institute. The Paterson Globalfoods Institute is an addition to RRC PolytechExchange District Campus that was completed in January 2013, and serves as the new home of the Culinary Arts, Hospitality and Tourism Management and Professional Baking and Patisserie programs.

The Manitoba government also announced a contribution of $5 million towards the construction of the building. The project was developed by RRC Polytech, with additional project partners including: Paterson GlobalFoods Inc., Centre Venture, City of Winnipeg, Province of Manitoba, Government of Canada, and Prairie Architects. Both the exterior as well as a significant amount of the interior of the Tower (including the main floor banking hall) were fully restored as part of the renovation.

The new 100,000-square-foot (9,300 m^{2}) institute provides classroom and kitchen space and two restaurants on the first three floors, a rooftop patio and garden, as well as residence for 103 students on the floors above. The housing units are available in one or two bedroom configurations. The renovation was expected to cost $34 million, up from the initial $27 million estimate, and involved the addition of two new glass fronted structures adjacent to the existing Union Bank Tower. The new adjacent structures were required for the project because the tower itself could not house the necessary heating and cooling systems. The adjacent structure is located on the lot formerly occupied by the Leland Hotel which burned down in 1999.

Jane's Restaurant is an 80-seat fine dining restaurant located in the renovated main banking hall. The building also features a 94-seat casual cafe called the "Culinary Exchange", and "Grab-and-Go", a quick service food outlet.
