= Ritchie Mill =

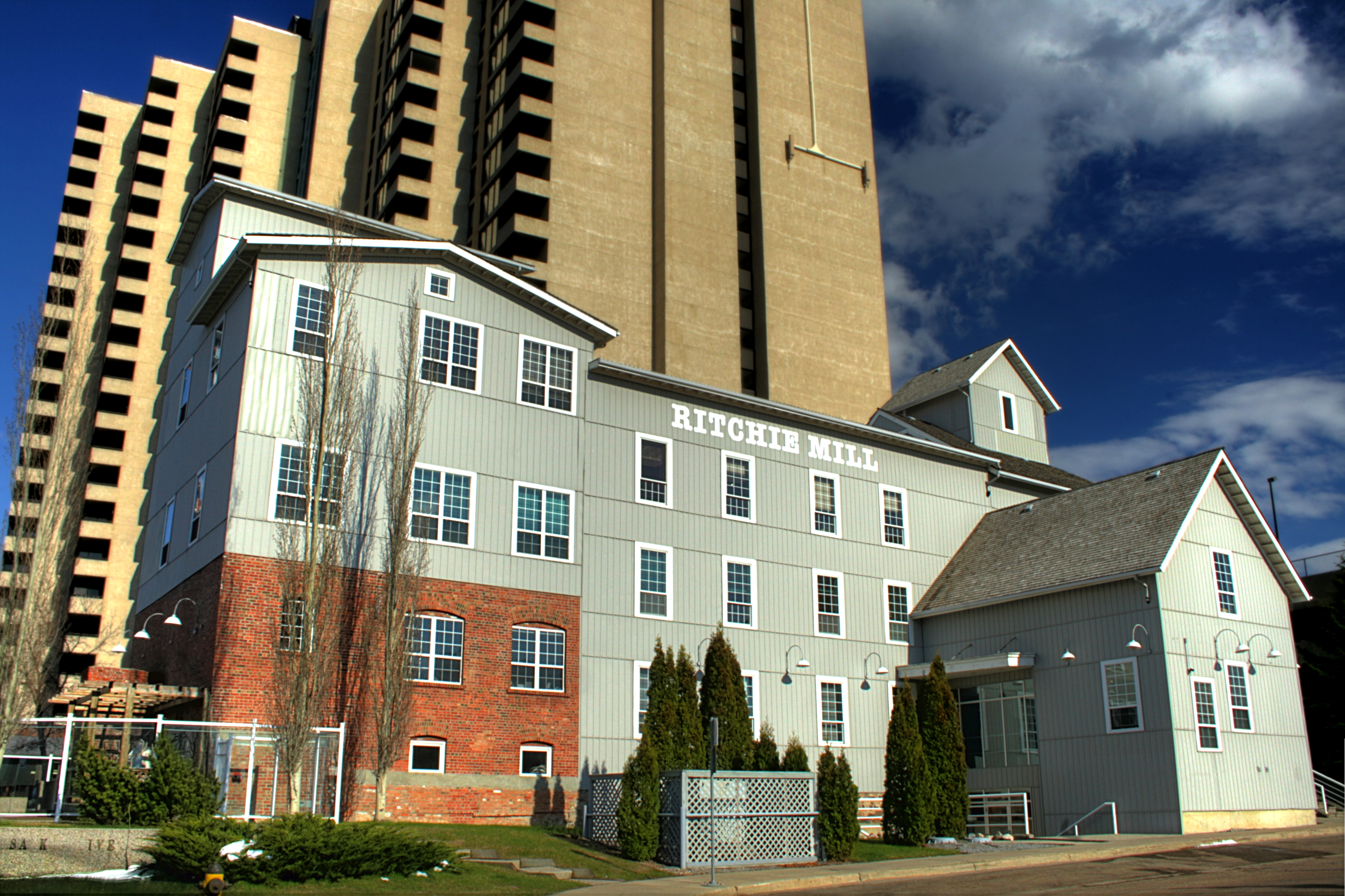
- Ritchie Mill building

- Location within Edmonton

General information
- Type: Flour mill
- Location: Strathcona, Alberta, 10170 Saskatchewan Drive, Edmonton, Canada
- Coordinates: 53°31′24.4″N 113°29′39.6″W
- Construction started: 1892

Technical details
- Floor count: 5

The Ritchie Mill is the oldest surviving flour mill in the province of Alberta.

== History ==
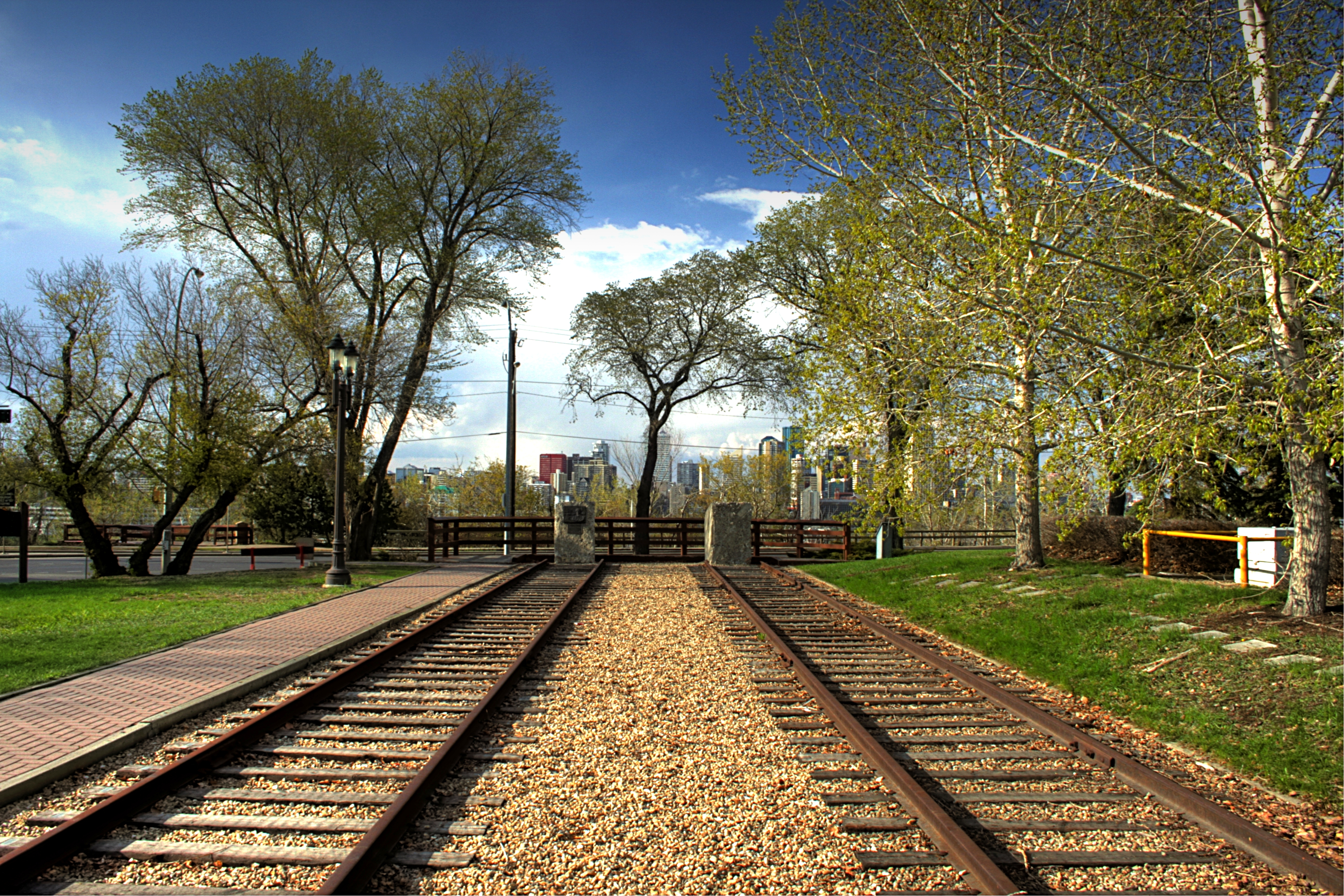
End of Steel Park by Ritchie Mill

Constructed in 1892 and the oldest surviving flour mill in the province, the Ritchie Mill is significant because of its association with the early agricultural and industrial development of Alberta. It is associated with early technical innovation, using steam powered, steel rollers instead of the traditional stone wheels that became pitted when grinding hard prairie wheat.

The Ritchie Mill is also significant because of its association with industrial and agricultural development in an urban setting and with the development of the Strathcona community, one of Edmonton's oldest settled neighborhoods, dating from the arrival of the Calgary and Edmonton Railway in 1892, which terminated at the North Saskatchewan River Valley. The Ritchie Mill was located at the 'End of Steel' to take advantage of the rail link with the southern part of the province. Elevators were added in 1895 and 1902 and the building functioned as a flour mill until 1948.

The Ritchie Mill is also significant because of its association with Robert Ritchie who arrived in Strathcona in 1892. Within a year he had built and began operating the flour mill and added elevators in 1895 and 1905. Ritchie also served in local politics as alderman, school trustee, justice of the peace, and in 1906 as mayor of Strathcona.

As of 2012 the building had been converted to an iconic office & retail building with numerous professional tenants.

== Heritage recognition ==
The surviving parts of the mill were designated a Provincial Historic Resource in 1979 and a Municipal Historic Resource in 1997.

== See also ==
- Esterhazy Flour Mill - 1904 wood-frame construction flour mill in Saskatchewan
- Flour Mill
- Heritage buildings in Edmonton
- Krause Milling Co. - 1929 grain elevator and flour mill site in Radway, Alberta.
- Lake of the Woods Milling Company Limited - started May 21, 1887 in Keewatin, Ontario.
- List of attractions and landmarks in Edmonton
- Ritchie, Edmonton
- Watson's Mill - is a historic gristmill in Manotick, Ontario, Canada.
