= Krause Milling Co. =

Building in Alberta, Canada

- Location: Radway, Alberta, Canada
- Type: open-air, agriculture

The Krause Milling Co grain elevator and flour mill site complex is composed of a 1929 grain elevator, drive shed, office/powerhouse, storage building and foundation of the 1929 flour mill, in the center of Radway, Alberta.

== See also ==
- Esterhazy Flour Mill - 1904 wood-frame construction flour mill in Saskatchewan
- Flour Mill
- Lake of the Woods Milling Company Limited - started May 21, 1887 in Keewatin, Ontario.
- List of museums in Alberta
- Ritchie Mill - oldest surviving flour mill in the province of Alberta.
- Scandia, Alberta
- Watson's Mill - is a historic gristmill in Manotick, Ontario, Canada.
