= Paterson GlobalFoods =

Agrifood company in Canada

Paterson GlobalFoods Inc.
- Formerly: N. M. Paterson Company (1912-1947); N. M. Paterson & Sons Ltd. (1947-2005)
- Type: Privately Held
- Industry: Agriculture
- Founded: 1908
- Founder: Norman McLeod Paterson
- Headquarters: 22nd Fl - 333 Main St., Winnipeg, Manitoba, Canada
- Key people: Andrew Paterson, President & CEO
- Website: Paterson GlobalFoods

Paterson GlobalFoods (PGF) is a family-owned international agri-food conglomerate. It was established in 1908 as the N. M. Paterson and Company.

It is headquartered at 333 Main St. in Winnipeg, Manitoba, Canada.

== Subsidiary companies ==
Paterson GlobalFoods owns several different companies in the agriculture/agri-foods space:

- Paterson Grain
- Alliance Grain Terminal (AGT) — export grain terminal located on the south shore of the Burrard Inlet at the Port of Vancouver
- Biomass Fuels — energy venture under development as of 2024
- DJK Transport — Regina, Saskatchewan-based transport company
- FeedMax — animal feed mill Killarney, Manitoba
- Growers International Organic Sales Inc. (GIOSI) — handler and supplier of western Canadian organic grain, headquartered in Winnipeg, Manitoba
- NutraGro — high-volume fertilizer distribution centre located in Winnipeg
- NutraSun Foods — flour mill in Saskatchewan
- O Foods — oat mills in Rosser, Manitoba
- Paterson Financial — financial products provider for the agricultural industry
- PGF Biofuels — producer of feedstock for the biodiesel and biojet fuel industries
- PTC Construction — agricultural construction, maintenance and engineering services company based in Winnipeg
- Truck Freight International — agricultural trucking company based in Winnipeg

== See also ==
- Norman McLeod Paterson
- Paterson Globalfoods Institute
- Norman Paterson School of International Affairs
