= Watson's Mill =

Historic flour and gristmill in Manotick, Ontario, Canada

Coordinates: 45.226989°N 75.682744°W

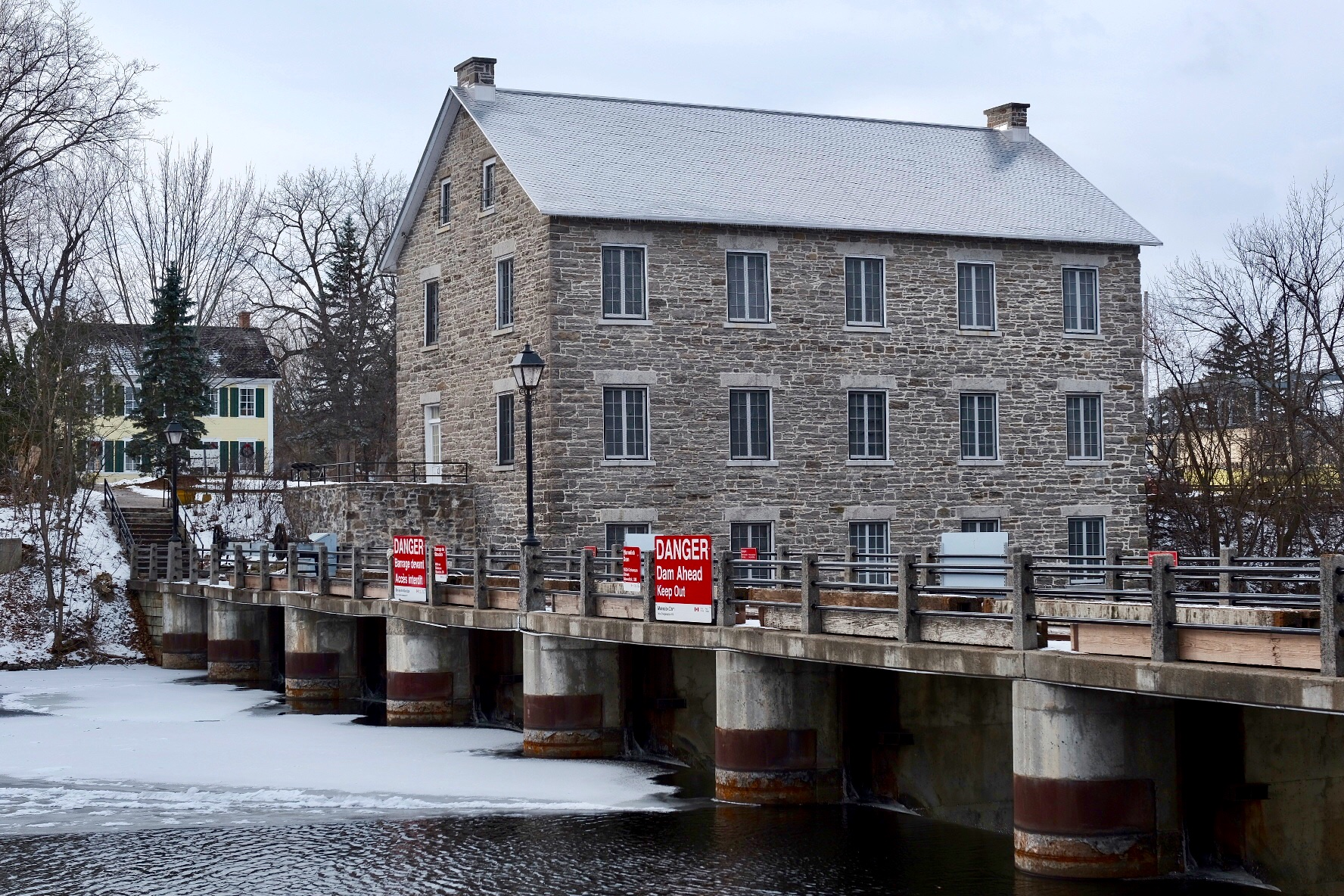
Watson's Mill, 2018

Watson's Mill is an historic flour and gristmill in Manotick, Ontario, Canada. It is the only working museum in the Ottawa area and one of the very few operating industrial grist mills in North America. Watson's Mill still sells stone-ground whole wheat flour which is made on site. The mill is also well known for its ghost Ann. The legend is that Ann Currier, wife of Joseph, haunts the mill, following her death in a tragic accident there in 1861. Watson's Mill is Manotick's most recognized landmark. Its image is used as a symbol for the village.

Moss Kent Dickinson and Joseph Merrill Currier founded the mill as the Long Island Milling Enterprise in 1860. It was one of a series of mills constructed in the area using power from the Rideau Canal. It earned its current name when it was purchased by Harry Watson in 1946. Watson was the last owner to operate the mill at an industrial level. When the Rideau Valley Conservation Authority bought the mill in 1972, it was developed into a museum.

The mill is open to the public during the summer months and hosts a variety of events, including milling demonstrations every Sunday.

== History ==
Watson's Mill was originally known as the 'Long Island Milling Enterprise', and was constructed by Thomas Langrell, an Ottawa contractor, for two prominent Ottawa businessmen: Moss Kent Dickinson and Joseph Merrill Currier. Dickinson was a successful forwarder and steamboat owner. He was nicknamed 'King of the Rideau' because of his many freight and passenger steamers that travelled up and down the Canal. Dickinson was also mayor of Ottawa from 1864 to 1866, just prior to Confederation, and lived in what is now the South African Embassy. His partner, Joseph Currier, was a lumber baron, and a partner in the Victoria Foundry located in Ottawa, where all of the Mill machinery was cast. Watson's Mill was originally one of four milling operations built at the same time. A saw mill was completed in 1859, the gristmill in 1860, and a carding mill in 1861. The Canada Bung, Plug and Spile Factory was constructed in 1875, completing the Long Island Milling Enterprise, later to be known as the 'Manotick Mills'.

Dickinson intended to develop a village around the Long Island Mills complex. He bought 30 acres of land and sold it as building plots. The village was named 'Manotick', an Algonquin word meaning island. Dickinson also built a house across from Watson's Mill, which still stands today and has been turned into the 'Dickinson House Museum'.

Watson's Mill remained in the Dickinson family until 1928 when Elizabeth, Moss Kent Dickinson's youngest daughter, sold it to Alexander Spratt. Spratt had six children: Charlie, Billie, Helen, Ken, Dick and Hubert. The whole family lived in the Dickinson House while Alexander was running the mill. Alexander died of brain cancer in 1936. His wife continued with the business until it was sold in 1946 to Harry Watson. Watson, his wife Anna and his six children Ron, Bill, Jack, Jim, Bob and Mary all lived in the Dickinson House as well.

With the introduction of the Canadian Pacific Railway, it became cheaper to import wheat and flour from the West than to grow and mill wheat in Ontario. Spratt and Watson gradually transformed the Mill into a feed and seed operation to keep up with the changing times and to accommodate the local dairy and livestock farmers. Watson also began distributing coal and cement.

== Ann Crosby Currier ==
Watson's Mill is supposedly haunted by the ghost of Ann Crosby Currier, the second wife of Joseph Currier. Born in 1841, Ann was the daughter of a successful hotel owner and grew up along with seven siblings, in the village of Caldwell, New York. In 1861, Ann was married to Joseph Merrill Currier, at that time a co-owner of the Mill.

On Monday, March 11, 1861, 6 weeks into the marriage, coinciding with the return from Joseph and Ann's honeymoon, Currier and Dickinson held a small party to celebrate their first successful year of operation. While making their way through the congestion of moving equipment and machinery, tragedy struck. Ann's crinoline and dress became caught in one of the turbine shafts on the second floor of the Mill and she was flung against a pillar and killed instantly. Following this tragedy, Joseph immediately lost all interest in the Mill and eventually sold his shares to his partner Dickinson.

Since that time, there have been numerous unconfirmed sightings of Ann's ghost in Watson's Mill, causing the site to be often considered among Ottawa's haunted buildings. Watson's Mill currently runs a number of events promoting the haunted nature of the building including the Terrifying Tales at Twilight and visits by the Haunted Ottawa and Paranormal Society.

Ann's grave is now located in Beechwood Cemetery in Ottawa, where it was moved from a cemetery north of the Rideau River, at the request of her husband.

== Facilities ==
Watson's Mill was built using limestone quarried from the banks of the Rideau River, as well as wood cut locally and milled at the Long Island Sawmill. The mill's interior is highly ornamented; the partners, Dickinson and Currier, wished to make the Mill a model for industrial achievement and business entrepreneurship. Watson's Mill was powered by five turbines constructed in Joseph Currier's foundry. With a sixth turbine that was used to power the Bung Mill across the river. The Ottawa Citizen newspaper described Watson's Mill as "a castle in the air" on its opening day.

Watson's Mill continues to run milling demonstrations on Sundays during the summer season. Whole wheat flour milled onsite is available for sale in the gift shop as well as fresh whole wheat bread made from Watson's Mill flour. Today, Watson's Mill still has much of the original machinery in working order. The following machinery is active in milling demonstrations:

- 3 of the 6 original turbines (others onsite but unused)
- 1 of the 4 original pairs of millstones (another on display); 5th turbine powered the rest of the machinery.
- Auger
- Bolter
- Feed grinder
- hopper and grain Elevators
- 6th powered the Bung Mill

=== Turbines ===
The turbines are the most important pieces of machinery as they supply power to all the other equipment in the mill. They are the originals, cast in 1859 in the Victoria Foundry in Ottawa. The larger turbines can generate 40-horse power and the smaller one makes 20-horse power. The turbines could operate all year, because the constant flow of water through the flume never froze. The first turbine drives the feed grinder and bolter, the third drives the elevators and auger, and the fifth drives the millstones and the seed cleaner. The other three are no longer in use.

=== Hopper, Elevators and Garner Bin ===
After the wheat is weighed, it is dumped into the receiving hopper. There is a small opening at the bottom, which is controlled by a lever. It allows the miller to control the amount of wheat that enters the system. This begins the automated milling process. From this point on, the grain and grist do not come into contact with human hands until the flour is ready to be bagged. Once poured through the hopper, the grain is conveyed to the second floor, via the conveyor elevator, and stored in a large storage bin called the garner bin.

=== Millstones and Auger ===
Millstones can be made from a variety of materials. The stones at Watson's Mill are made from pieces of very hard quartz called buhrstone. They were imported from France in 1859. The reason for this was that native stone from Canada and the United States would chip off into the final product. The face of the stone has a pattern of grooves, which is called the dress. Different types of millstones have different patterns - Watson's Mill's millstones have a 3/4 dress. The particular dress of the stone indicates what substance it ground. The grooves on the two stones are at different angles, and they act like scissors during milling. Only the top stone, the runner stone, turns, while the bottom bedstone remains stationary. The stones each weigh about 900 kilograms, which is about the weight of a Volkswagen Beetle.

Two large iron cast wheels in front of the millstone are used by the miller to control the machinery. The small wheel allows the miller to raise and lower the top stone, or runner. The large wheel is used to open the gate to the turbine that turns the millstone.

Since the top stone is so heavy, and spins quickly, a significant amount of heat is generated, which in turn warms the grist. It is important that the windows in the mill are open during milling, because dust particles are combustible. During the process, when the grist is warm and moist, it is difficult to separate the bran and chaff from the flour, so the grist needs to be cooled. The grist travels up to the attic in the grist elevator, where it falls into a machine called the auger, which cools and fluffs the grist.

=== Bolter ===
From the auger, the grist falls into the bolter. The bolter is a large sifting machine located on the second floor. The bolter separates the flour from the bran so that pure stone-ground whole wheat flour is the final product. Both products drop down to the main floor where they are separated into two different bags. The flour is then bagged into smaller portions which can be purchased at the mill.

=== Feed Grinder ===
The feed grinder introduced another method of grinding grain. Whereas the particular dress of the millstones limits what substance can be ground, the feed grinder was capable of grinding a variety of grains and seeds. This machine was mostly used to mix feed for the local farmers' animals. Today the feed grinder is used to grind corn, which the mill sells as duck chow.

== Milling and Flour ==
The Watson's Mill has several items for sale that are made in house using their historical milling equipment. Today the Mill is run by trained volunteers, but in 1860 they were skilled tradesmen. In 1860, the Head Miller was paid $1.50/hour as well as 1/12th of each flour grind. the Mill Labourer's were paid $1.00/hour.

Head Miller	Years active
W. M. Harvey	1860 – 1864
Owen O’Conner	1865 – 1876
John Scott	1877 – 1892
John O’Conner	1893 – 1900
	1901 – 1927
Alexander Spratt	1928 – 1936
	1937
Gordon Ferris	1938 – 1943
Harry Watson	1943 – 1963
Milling Ceases	1963 – 1974
Ole Steeridge	1974 – 1980
Reg Weedmark	1981 – 1984
Frank Deguire	1984 – 1987
Mike McGuire	1988 – 2001
Bill Schaubs	2001 – 2013
Chris Innes	2013 – Present

The items the Mill has for sale are listed as follows. It is recommended to check the Mill website in advance for any last-minute changes there may be to prices or availability. Note that 50lbs of flour must be ordered in advance.

Flour	Price
2lbs	$10
5lbs	$16
10lbs	$26
50lbs	$80
Honey Oat Bread Loaf	$6

== Long Island Milling Enterprise ==
In addition to the grist mill, a sawmill, carding mill and bung factory were also part of the Long Island Milling Enterprise.

=== Sawmill ===
Located on the opposite bank of the river, Moss Kent Dickinson and Joseph Currier built their first sawmill using their newly acquired waterpower rights to the dam. The sawmill was built sometime before 1859 and wood sawn from this mill was used in the construction of the Long Island Grist Mill (Watson's Mill). The sawmill was small in size, measuring only 72 feet by 22 feet. Due to the expansion of the bulkhead in 1870, this first sawmill had to be removed. Construction for a new sawmill began before the old one was torn down.

The second sawmill was larger than the first, measuring 30 feet by 100 feet. By 1876, a 20-foot addition was added to accommodate the new Canadian Bung, Plug and Spile Factory. The second sawmill was destroyed by fire over the summer of 1887. Although all physical evidence of the sawmill is now gone, it played a vital role in the creation of Manotick by providing lumber for the manufacture of woodwork for wagons, carriages, sleighs, wheels, furniture and building construction.

=== Carding mill ===
Built in just eight months, the woolen carding mill was opened December 1, 1861. Located beside the gristmill, the carding mill completed the three buildings that made up the Long Island Milling Enterprise.

Originally the carding mill measured 32 feet by 30 feet, but by 1870 more space was needed and the mill was expanded to 60 feet by 30 feet. This mill was not only a place where farmers could have their wool carded and dressed, but also where custom cloth could be ordered. From 1874 to 1876, the carding mill was leased to R.W. Conway who ran the business. The carding mill met its fate when a fire destroyed the entire building. The exact date of the fire is not known, but it is believed to have occurred sometime between 1879 and 1885. Although useful to farming families, the carding mill was never replaced, scratched out of Dickinson's records by Moss Kent himself. Today, very little remains of the carding mill, except for remnants of its foundation buried in the riverbank.

=== Bung factory ===
Moss Kent Dickinson established the Canada Bung, Plug and Spile Factory in 1875. At the time, there was only one other operation in Canada. Dickinson shipped his bungs (wooden stoppers for barrels) all over the world

After the Sawmill, which originally housed the bung factory, burned in 1887, Dickinson decided that only the bung mill was worth salvaging. A new building was constructed a little ways downstream and on the opposite riverbank from the gristmill.

To power the bung mill, a sixth turbine was installed in the basement of his gristmill, and a 3-inch steel cable ran out of the basement window and across the river channel to the new mill. When power was needed, a string was pulled, which rang a bell in the gristmill, notifying the miller to start the sixth turbine. The bung factory was dismantled in 1926 and moved to become part of a residence on Long Island in Manotick.

== Modern times ==
On July 1, 1963, the National Capital Commission (NCC) entered into a lease agreement with Harry Watson to open the Mill as a heritage attraction. The Rideau Valley Conservation Authority (RVCA) purchased Watson's Mill, Dickinson House and the Carriage Shed in 1972 in order to preserve this heritage landmark and the name 'Watson's Mill' was kept. The RVCA significantly restored the Mill – reopening it as a functioning grist mill and museum. In 2008, Watson's Mill Manotick Incorporated (WMMI) became the owner of the Watson's Mill property. Today, it continues to run as a functioning industrial museum and community social centre. Watson's Mill thrives with a mandate to continue operating as a flour and feed mill, as well as a social, cultural and educational focal point for its many visitors.

Watson's Mill is situated on the banks of the Rideau River, in the village of Manotick, Ontario. It is built next to the control dam on the backchannel as the Rideau River splits around Long Island. Built across the other channel are the Long Island Locks. Watson's Mill is 20 km south of downtown Ottawa, Ontario.

== Affiliations ==
This museum is affiliated with: Ottawa Museum Network, and the Society for the Preservation of Old Mills (SPOOM).

== See also ==
- Esterhazy Flour Mill - 1904 wood-frame construction flour mill in Saskatchewan
- Flour Mill
- Krause Milling Co. - 1929 grain elevator and flour mill site in Radway, Alberta.
- Lake of the Woods Milling Company Limited - started May 21, 1887 in Keewatin, Ontario.
- Ritchie Mill - oldest surviving flour mill in the province of Alberta.
- List of designated heritage properties in Ottawa
