= Lake of the Woods Milling Company =

Canadian milling company

- Founded: 29 May 1903
- Defunct: 7 February 1977
- Fate: Acquired by Ogilvie Flour Mills
- Headquarters: 261 rue du Saint-Sacrement, Montreal, Quebec

The Lake of the Woods Milling Company Limited was a milling company that operated a flour mill in Keewatin, Ontario for 79 years. At the height of its production, it was possibly the largest flour mill in the British Commonwealth.

The mill operated from 1887 to 1967.

== History ==
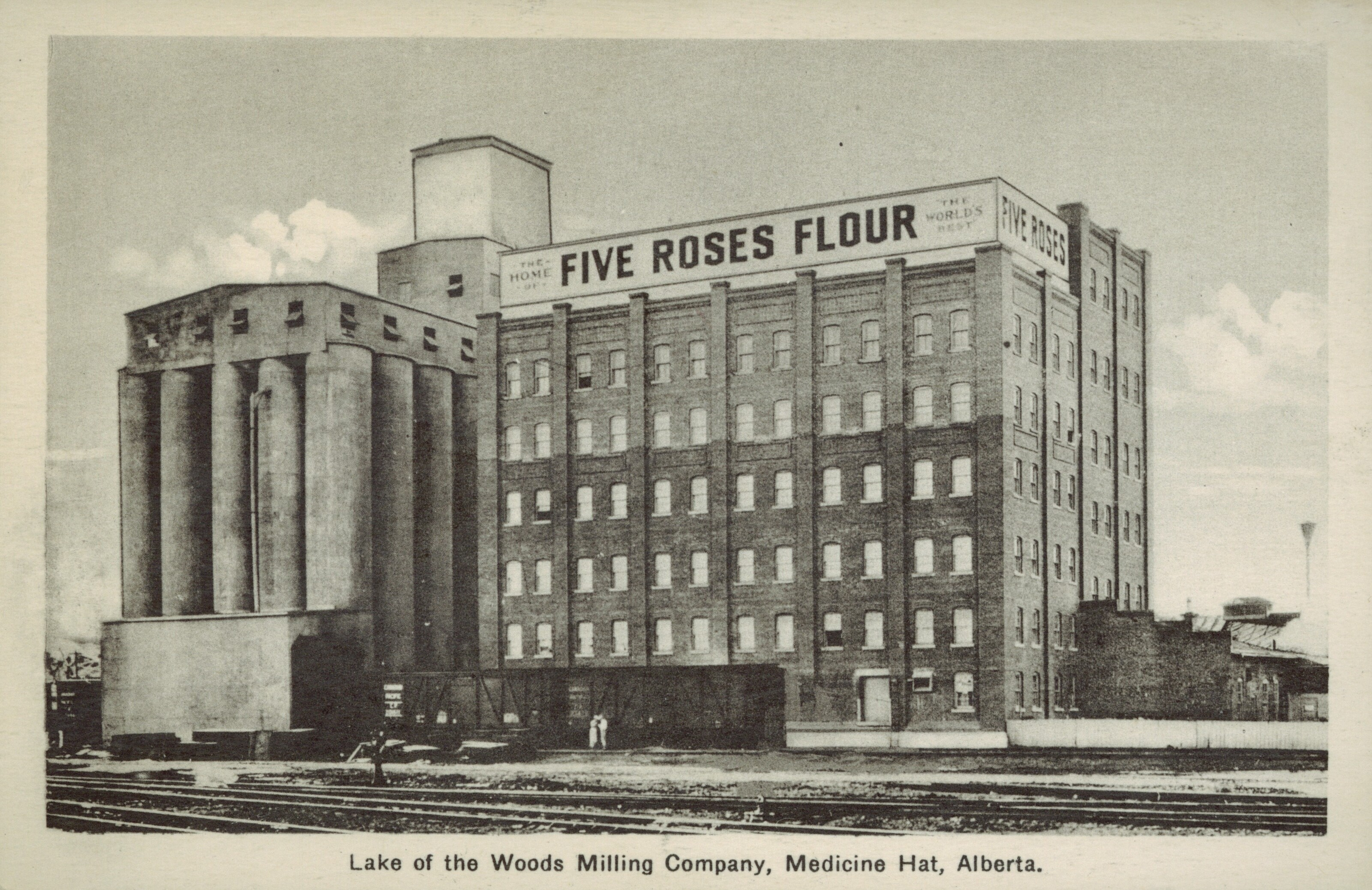
Front view of the Lake of the Woods Milling Company in Medicine Hat, Alberta in 1911 with a sign on roof reading "Five Roses Flour"

Lake of the Woods Milling Company was founded on May 21, 1887, to take advantage of a new railway and western grain production.

Formed by a team from the board of Canadian Pacific Railway (CPR), including George Stephen, 1st Baron Mount Stephen, William Cornelius Van Horne and James Ross, the headquarters were in Montreal, while the milling operations were based in Keewatin, Ontario. The location provided transportation via the CPR, access to raw product, and water-power from the Winnipeg River. The company was operated by James Parkyn until 1895; prior to that, he had been the owner of Mount Royal Mills in Montreal.

The first mill was completed in 1888 with vice-president John Mather overseeing construction and funded by an initial corporate capitalization of $300,000. Its peak production turned a daily 62,000 bushels of wheat into 10,000 barrels of flour. The flour was marketed under the name Five Roses, which became a world-famous brand. In 1913, Lake of the Woods released the first edition of the Five Roses Cook Book, which is still in production to this day.

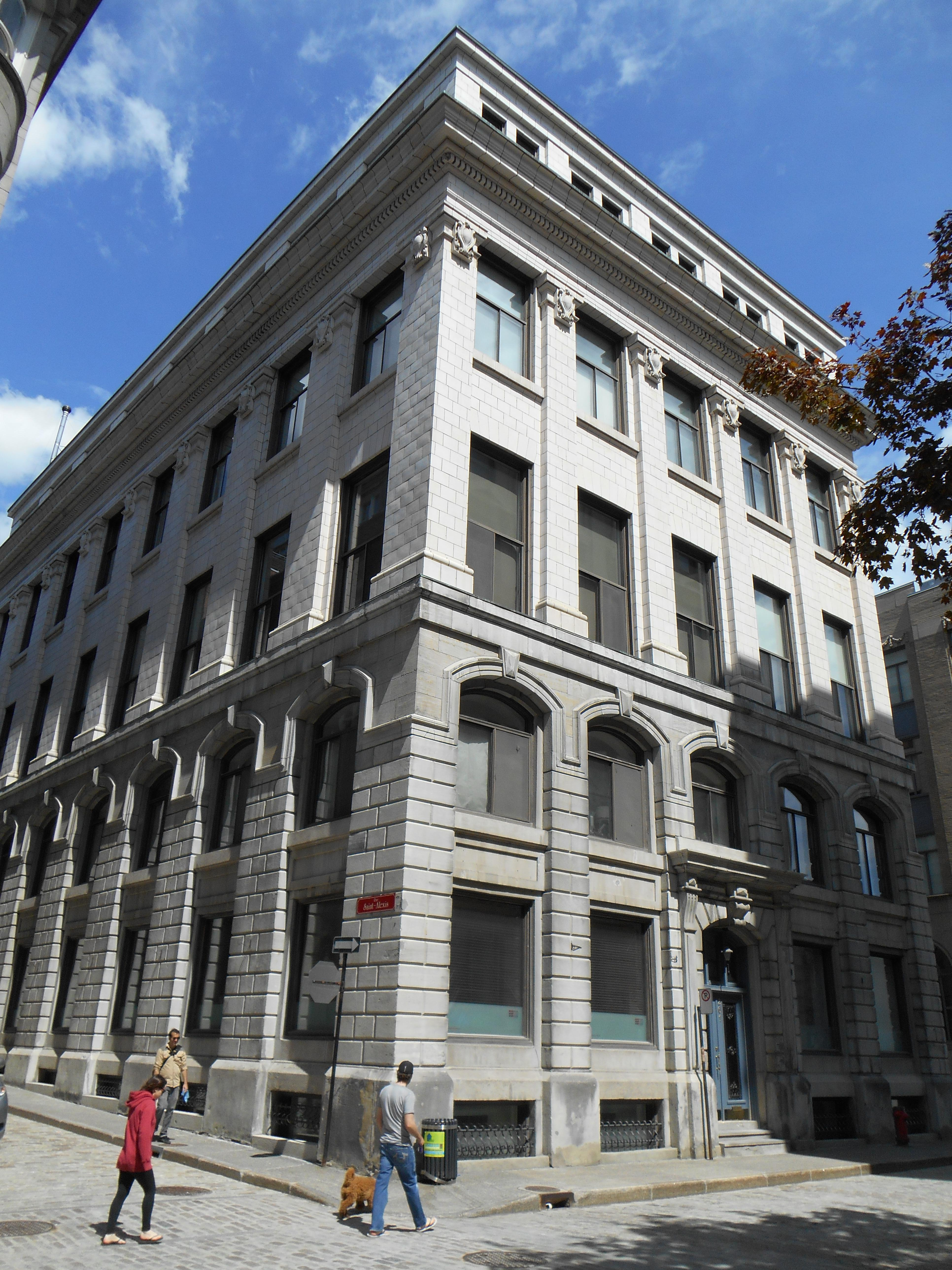
The company's 1909 head office building at 261 rue du Saint-Sacrement, by Ross & MacFarlane.

Most of the company's assets were purchased by a competitor, Ogilvie Flour Mills Company, in 1954. The mill closed in 1967.

== See also ==
- Esterhazy Flour Mill - 1904 wood-frame construction flour mill in Saskatchewan
- Flour Mill
- Krause Milling Co. - 1929 grain elevator and flour mill site in Radway, Alberta.
- Ritchie Mill - oldest surviving flour mill in the province of Alberta.
- Watson's Mill - is a historic gristmill in Manotick, Ontario, Canada.

== Bibliography ==
- The Toronto World - Oct 9, 1920
- Manitoba Historical Society - The Lake of the Woods: Its History, Geology, Mining and Manufacturing
- Lake of the Woods Museum
- Benidickson, Jamie (1994). "Mather, John". In Cook, Ramsay; Hamelin, Jean (eds.). Dictionary of Canadian Biography. Vol. XIII (1901–1910) (online ed.). University of Toronto Press.
