= Esterhazy Flour Mill =

Flour mill in Saskatchewan, Canada

- Location within Saskatchewan
- Location: Esterhazy, Saskatchewan
- Management: Friends of the Flour Mill and the Town of Esterhazy
- Coordinates: 50°39′11″N 102°4′16″W

Construction
- Built: 1904
- Completed: 1907
- Decommissioned: Operations at the mill ceased in the 1980s.

National Historic Site of Canada
- Official name: Esterhazy Flour Mill National Historic Site
- Designated: 2009

The Esterhazy Flour Mill is located at 517 Smith-Dorrien Street, Esterhazy, Saskatchewan. Construction of the mill was started in 1904 and was completed in 1907. The current owner is the Town of Esterhazy and is run by the Friends of the Flour Mill. The Esterhazy Flour Mill is the only remaining wood-frame construction flour mill in Saskatchewan. The Provincial Heritage Property designation was announced in 2005 and on July 8, 2009, the Esterhazy Flour Mill was designated as a National Historic Site.

== History ==
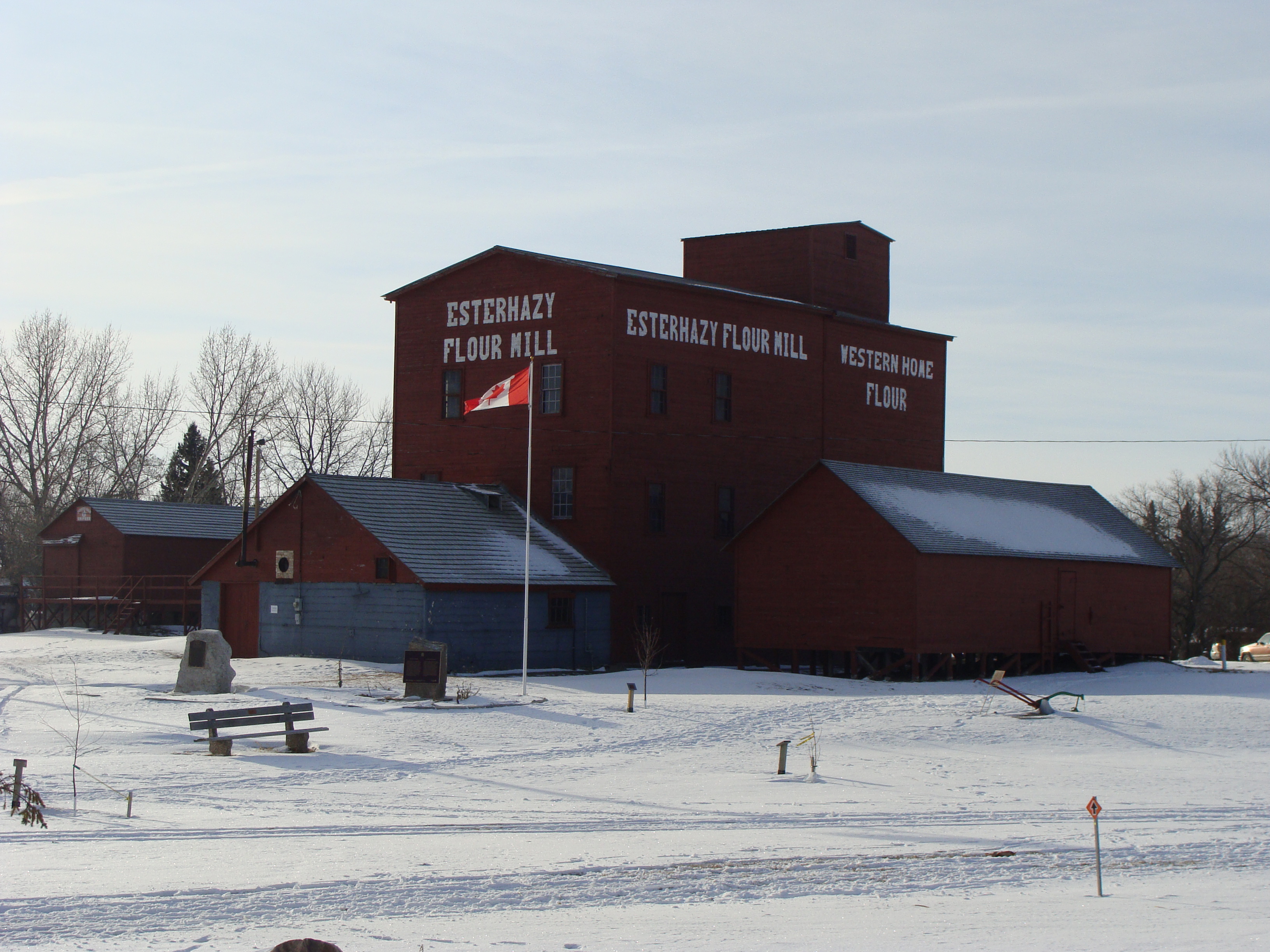
Esterhazy Flour Mill, December 2011

The Esterhazy Flour Mill was built by James Saunders during 1904 to 1907. There were many hold-ups in the construction of the Esterhazy Flour Mill due to non-delivery of materials. Milling began on June 18, 1907.

James Saunders, of Whitewood, Saskatchewan, was a small operator who serviced consumers in the area that surrounded his mills, by only selling surplus flour for export. Saunders owned mills in both Manitoba and Saskatchewan, including the nearby Whitewood Milling Company in Whitewood, Saskatchewan. The grain was purchased from local producers and produced a local commodity of flour. The mill also generated off-peak business for the area's railroad which ensured year-round rail service to the area.

The first manager employed the facility by Saunders was Mr. Snider. Snider left in September 1907 and was replaced by J.A Macdonald for the winter of 1907. W.S. Ford of Whitewood took over as head miller and manager in 1908. The miller from Saunder's Whitewood mill, Frank Size, leased the Esterhazy Flour Mill from Saunders after the Whitewood mill was destroyed by fire in 1909. Frank Size purchased the Esterhazy Flour Mill from James Saunders in 1911 and continued on as head miller.

Rudolph Junek purchased the mill in 1939 and operated the facility with assistance from his brother Stanley Junek and Charlie Lake. White flour was the main product produced, by Junek, through the war years, but brown flour was also produced during this time. Junek also advertised, at that time, that farmers could bring in wheat for milling without the quantity being entered in the permit book as long as it was for their own use.

Junek converted the mill from steam power to diesel power in 1947. An UD18A International engine was installed, which was able to produce 125 horsepower.

The Mill changed ownership a number of times between 1949, with the passing of Rudolph Junek, up until 1979. Joseph Junek, Rudolph's brother purchased it in 1949 after the passing of his brother and operated the mill with help from his brother Stanley Junek and Charlie Lake. In 1959 Junek sold the mill, due to his failing health, to partners John Jurick and Frank Pittner. Pittner's share was soon bought out later that year by John Kacsmar, who operated the mill with Jurick until the fall of 1962. Kacsmar then bought out Jurick's share in the mill. Otto Roseler took over the operations of the mill but Kacsmar helped when needed. The mill was then sold to Kurt Zwolinski of Virden, Manitoba in 1977. Ownership reverted to Roseler when Zwolinski was unable to overcome financial issues. Roseler continued to operate the mill until the spring of 1979 when it was sold to Martin Ritlop. Financial problems also plagued Ritlop and ownership of the mill once again reverted to Roseler. Roseler was the owner of the Esterhazy Flour Mill when he died in June 1979. Roseler willed the mill to the Grey Sisters, who operated the Esterhazy Hospital. The Grey Sisters did not take ownership of the mill and Ritlop was able to repurchase the mill.

Martin Ritlop was the mill's last owner and operator, owning the mill from 1979 to 1994. Production ceased at the mill in 1980 and the mill sat idle until 1994 when ownership of the mill was transferred to the Town of Esterhazy through tax enforcement.

=== Productivity ===
Productivity of the mill varied depending on the year and the time of the year. The Esterhazy Flour Mill is an example of a mid-sized mill. It was able to process 15 bushels of wheat in one hour, which would create about 600 pounds of flour. Operation at the mill depended on the quality and availability of wheat for milling. Repairs and maintenance were done throughout the summer months in the early years of operation of the mill, and production would resume in the fall with the availability of the new crop. The early years of operation of the mill were quite successful, with 40,000 bushels of wheat ground by the mill by April 1913.

Operation of the mill was sporadic during the Depression. Grain was brought in for milling during this time when local grain was of low quality or was not available.

=== Milling Process ===
The Esterhazy Flour Mill used a Hungarian-patented roller process for milling the hard spring wheat, which was produced on the prairies at the time. This milling process was state-of-the-art at the time of its installation in 1907.

== Today ==
The Esterhazy Flour Mill is the only remaining wood-frame construction flour mill in Saskatchewan. The mill is a complete illustration of period flour milling technology as it still contains almost all of the original equipment.

=== Restoration ===
After milling operations ceased no further maintenance was done to the property and the building began to deteriorate. The roof began to leak causing damage to the flooring inside the mill and once the windows had broken it became a nesting site for pigeons. After ownership of the mill was acquired by the Town of Esterhazy an unsuccessful attempt was made to find someone who would reactivate the mill. A feasibility study was proposed in 1995, to determine the costs of putting the mill back into operation. This was later rejected. Due to the poor physical appearance of the facility some citizens of Esterhazy pushed for the demolition of the mill.

A demolition order was rescinded by the Town of Esterhazy in February 1996, due to the interest of two parties in the mill facility, Hubert Lacoste, a miller from Quebec, and the Saskatchewan Heritage Branch. A suggestion of producing organic flour was suggested but not realized. The Saskatchewan Heritage Branch pointed out that the Esterhazy Flour Mill was the only one of its kind in Saskatchewan with original equipment still intact and that there was funding available for exterior restoration of the building.

A committee called Friends of the Esterhazy Flour Mill was established and a bylaw designated the Esterhazy Flour Mill as Municipal Heritage Property. The committee then set about establishing a list of priorities for the mill, which included: stabilization and repair of the equipment, cleaning the mill, collecting and archiving the documentation concerning the mill, and exterior renovations. A volunteer group set about the initial cleaning of the mill in the summer of 1996. Appropriate restoration knowledge was gathered from the provincial government while seeking heritage status. Restoration was done using appropriate materials and followed the national standards and guidelines of restorative work.

=== Provincial Historic Site Designation ===
The Esterhazy Flour Mill's plaque was officially unveiled on July 30, 2005. The Provincial Heritage Property designation was announced earlier in 2005 but the plaque unveiling was held during Esterhazy's centennial homecoming celebrations.

=== National Historic Site Designation ===
On July 8, 2009, the Esterhazy Flour Mill was designated as a National Historic Site, and is one of 44 National Historic Sites in Saskatchewan. The plaque commemorating the National Historic Site designation was unveiled on September 3, 2011. Mr. Garry Breiktreuz, Member of Parliament for Yorkton-Melville unveiled the plaque on behalf of the Honourable Peter Kent, Canada's Environment Minister and Minister responsible for Parks Canada.

== See also ==
- Flour Mill
- Krause Milling Co. - 1929 grain elevator and flour mill site in Radway, Alberta.
- Lake of the Woods Milling Company Limited - started May 21, 1887 in Keewatin, Ontario.
- Ritchie Mill - oldest surviving flour mill in the province of Alberta.
- Watson's Mill - is a historic gristmill in Manotick, Ontario, Canada.
