= Darling and Pearson =

Canadian architectural firm

Frank Darling (1850–1923)

John A. Pearson (1867–1940)

Darling and Pearson was an architectural firm based in Toronto from 1895 through 1937. The firm was prolific and produced consistently fine work though the patronage of notable figures of the Canadian establishment, and is responsible for enhancing the architectural character and quality of the city, and indeed the rest of Canada, in the first quarter of the 20th century.

== Formation ==
The firm was organized first as Darling, Curry, Sproatt, & Pearson in 1892, with partners Frank Darling, S. George Curry, Henry Sproatt, and John A. Pearson. From 1893 through 1896 it evolved into Darling, Sproatt & Pearson, then finally Darling and Pearson was founded as such in 1897.

Its heyday began with Darling's commissions from the Canadian Bank of Commerce in 1898, grand Edwardian buildings in Toronto, Winnipeg, Montreal, and Vancouver, and dozens of smaller branches in smaller Canadian cities and towns. Darling's training with the English architect George Edmund Street and Sir Arthur Blomfield in the early 1870s brought a serious, substantial, Victorian influence, well-suited to large civic and institutional projects in the years of the nation's development.

Their subsequent projects included the first tall steel-frame building in Canada (the Royal Tower in Winnipeg, 1904), the tallest building in Canada for three decades (the 1930 Canadian Bank of Commerce Building in Toronto, with York and Sawyer of New York), and the largest single building in the British Commonwealth (the Sun Life Building, Montreal, Started in 1914 and tower added by 1931).

== Legacy ==
After the deaths of Frank Darling in 1923 and Pearson in 1940, the firm was renamed Darling, Pearson and Cleveland with Darling's nephew as a partner.

== Notable buildings ==
=== Darling and Pearson ===
- Alpha Delta Phi Toronto Chapter House, 1894. Originally known as the Ince house
- Masaryk-Cowan Community Recreation Centre, 1898. Originally a curling rink
- Flavelle House, University of Toronto Faculty of Law, 1901
- Union Bank Building, 500 Main Street, Winnipeg, with the George A. Fuller Co., 1904
- 197 Yonge Street, Toronto, 1905 - renovated former banking building
- Canadian Bank of Commerce, Watson, Saskatchewan, 1906
- Convocation Hall, University of Toronto, 1906
- Moose Jaw Court House, Moose Jaw, Saskatchewan 1908
- Old Canadian Bank of Commerce Building, Montreal, 1906–09
- University of Toronto Sanford Fleming Building and Sigmund Samuel Building, 1907, and additions to the latter in 1912
- The Church of St. Mary Magdalene, 1908
- Grain Exchange Building - 167 Lombard Street, Winnipeg, 1906-1908
- Toronto General Hospital, College Wing, now the MaRS Discovery District building, 1911
- Canadian Pacific Building, Toronto, for a time the tallest building in Canada, 1913
- One King Street West, Toronto, 1914
- Royal Ontario Museum original building (west wing - Italianate-Neo-Romanesque), 1914
- Parkwood Estate, 1916
- North Toronto railway station of the Canadian Pacific Railway 1916
- Art Gallery of Ontario original building, 1916
- MaRS Discovery District - old Toronto General Hospital College Street wing - 101 College Street, Toronto, 1919
- Simcoe Hall, University of Toronto, 1924
- South Wing, Trinity College, Toronto, 1925
- Varsity Arena, Toronto, 1926
- Private Patients Pavilion (Thomas J. Bell Wing), Toronto General Hospital, 1930 – Demolished
- Canadian Bank of Commerce Building in Toronto; now Commerce Court North, 1930
- Canadian General Electric Building, 212 King Street West, Toronto, 1908
- Banting Institute, 100 College Street, 1930

=== Darling, Pearson and Cleveland ===
- Sun Life Building, Montreal, 1931
- expansions to the Art Gallery of Ontario, 1935

== Images ==
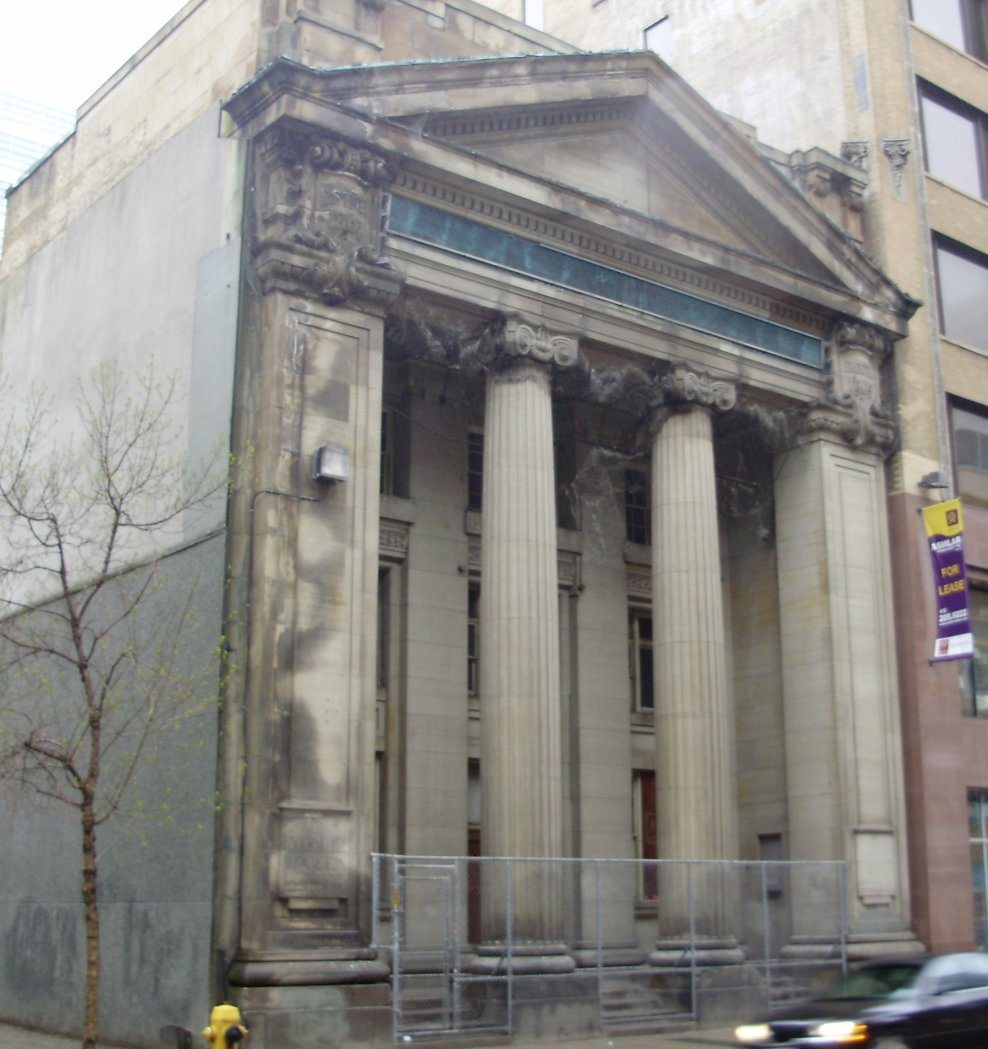
197 Yonge Street, Toronto

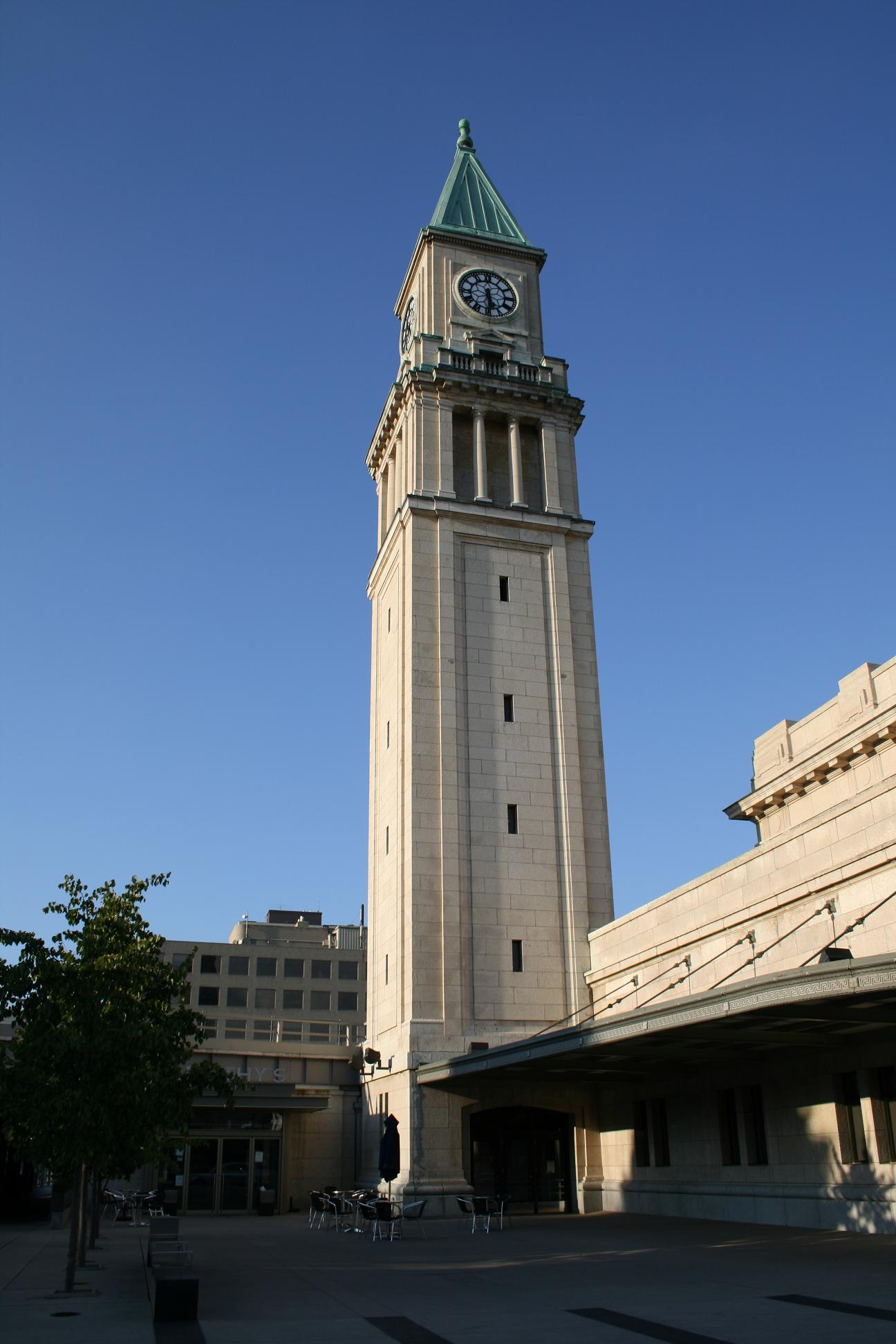
Summerhill-North Toronto CPR Station, its 140-foot clock tower modelled on the Campanile di San Marco in Venice

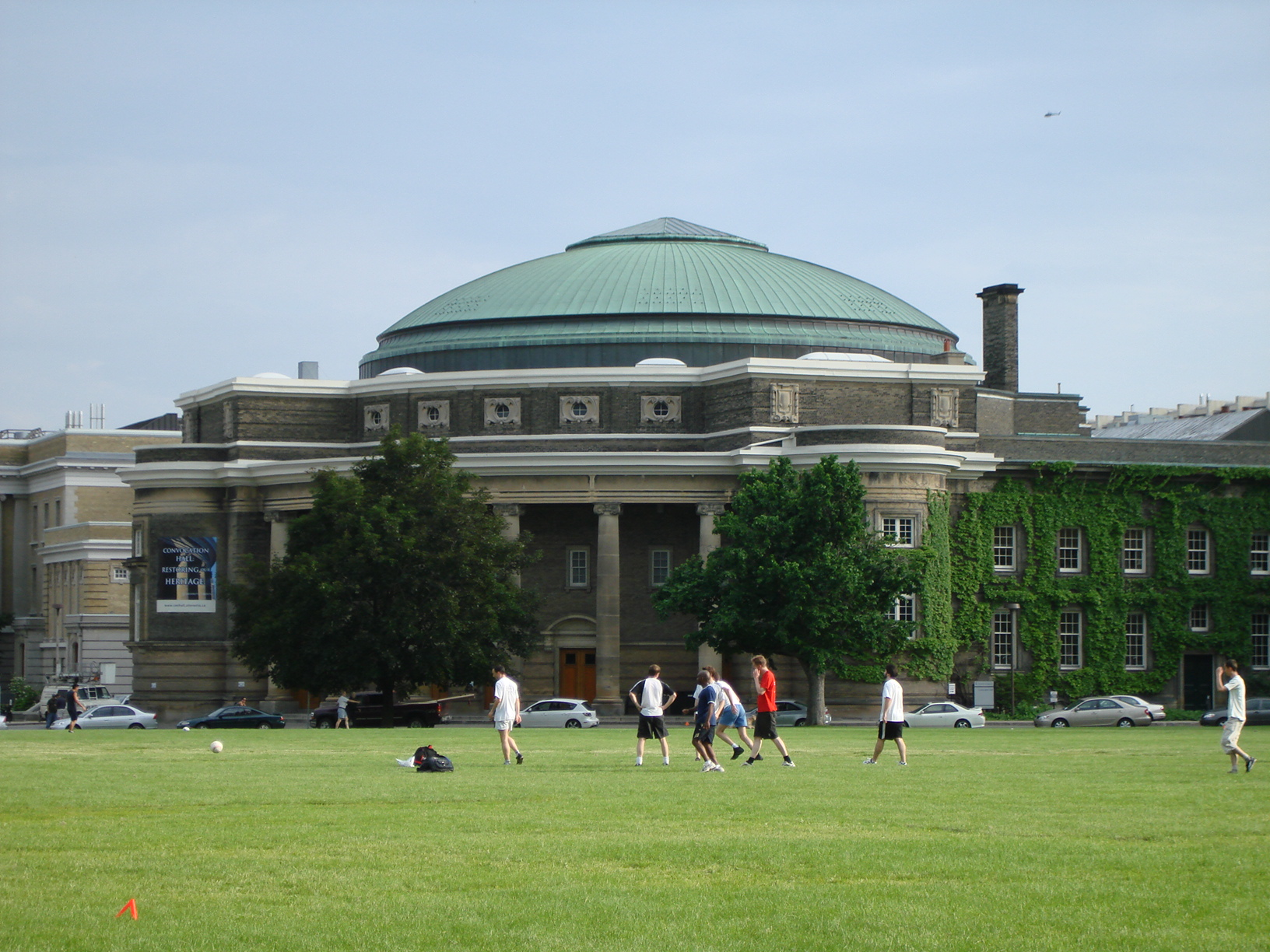
Convocation Hall, Toronto

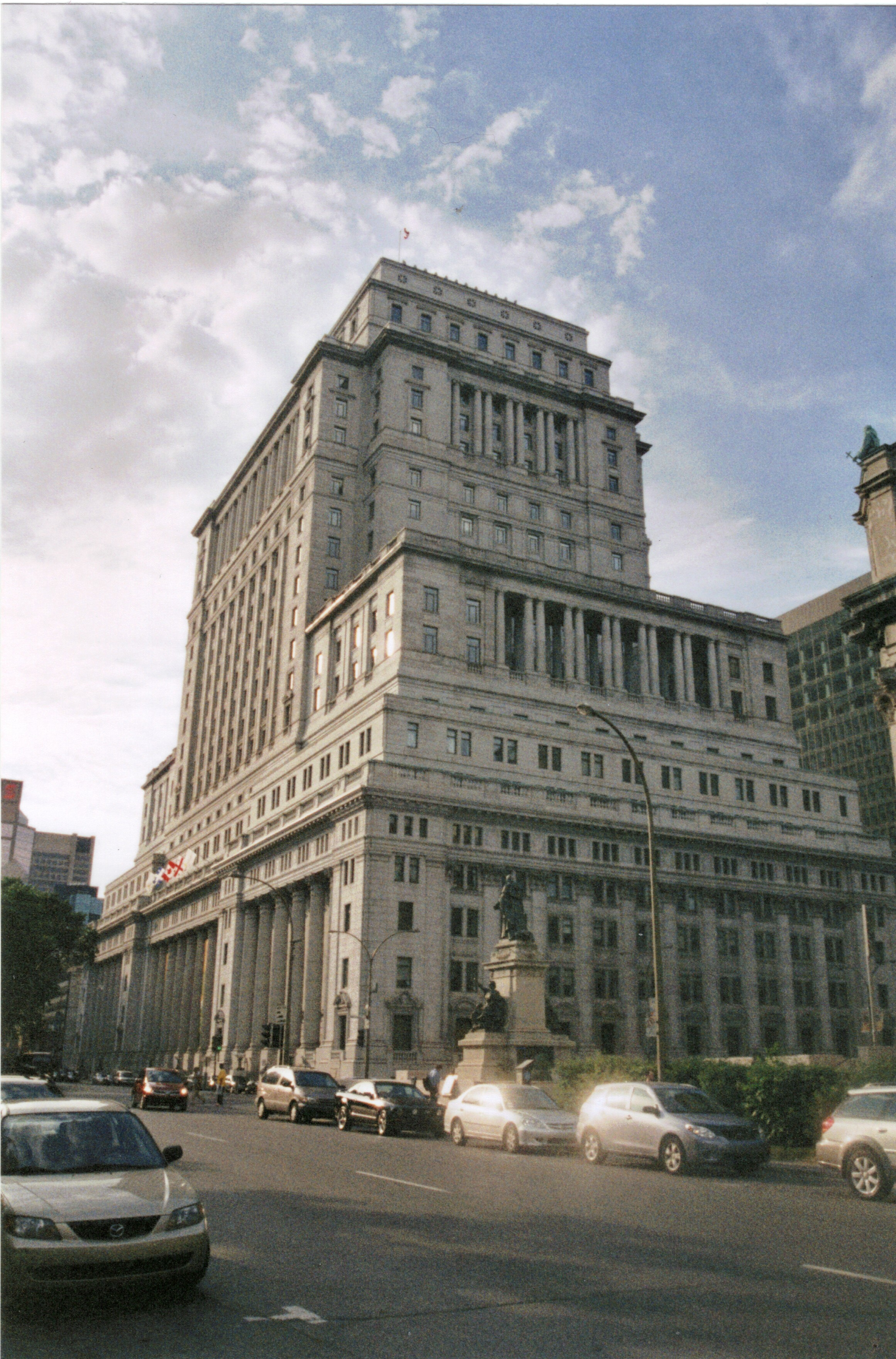
Sun Life Building, Montreal

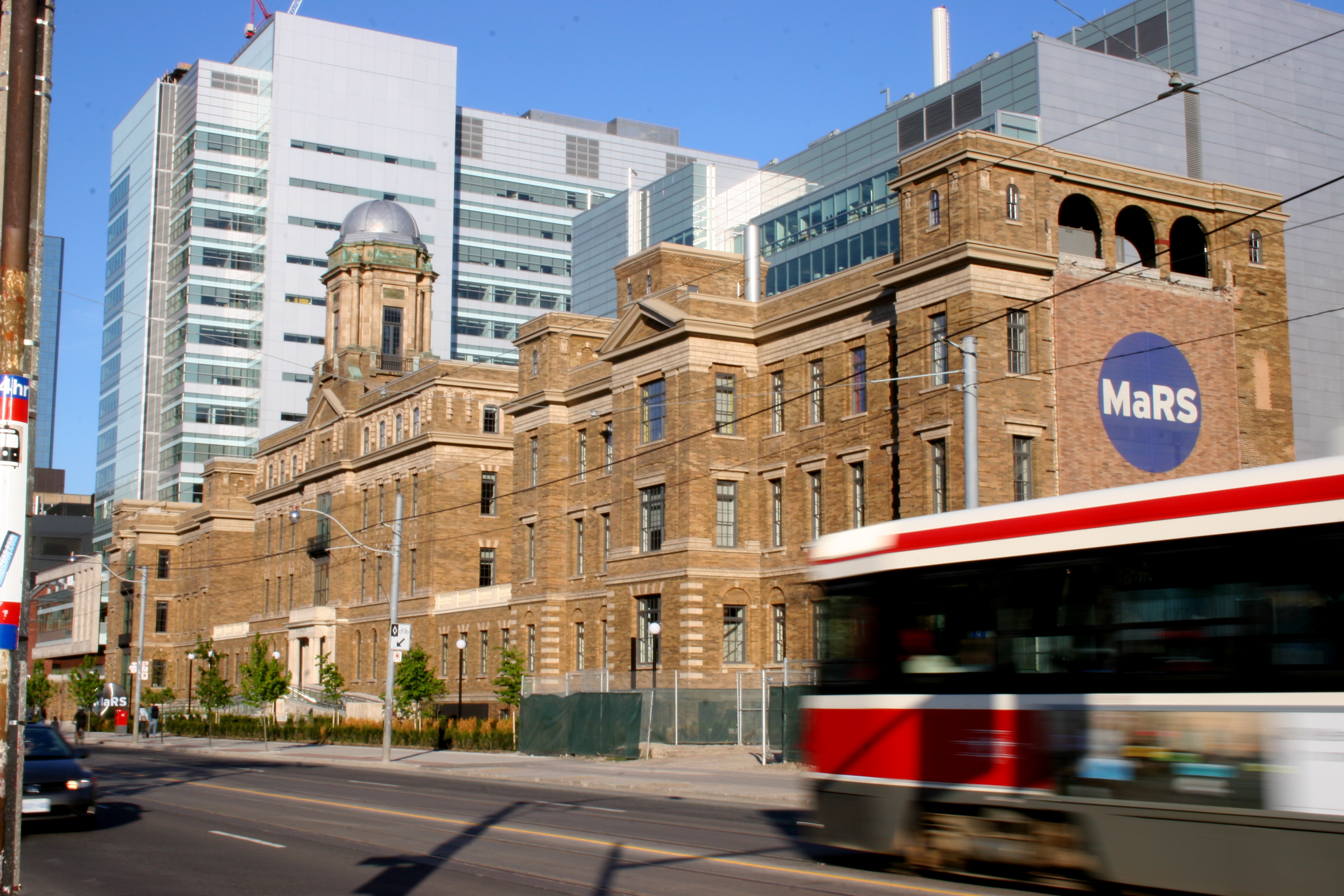
Toronto General Hospital, College Wing

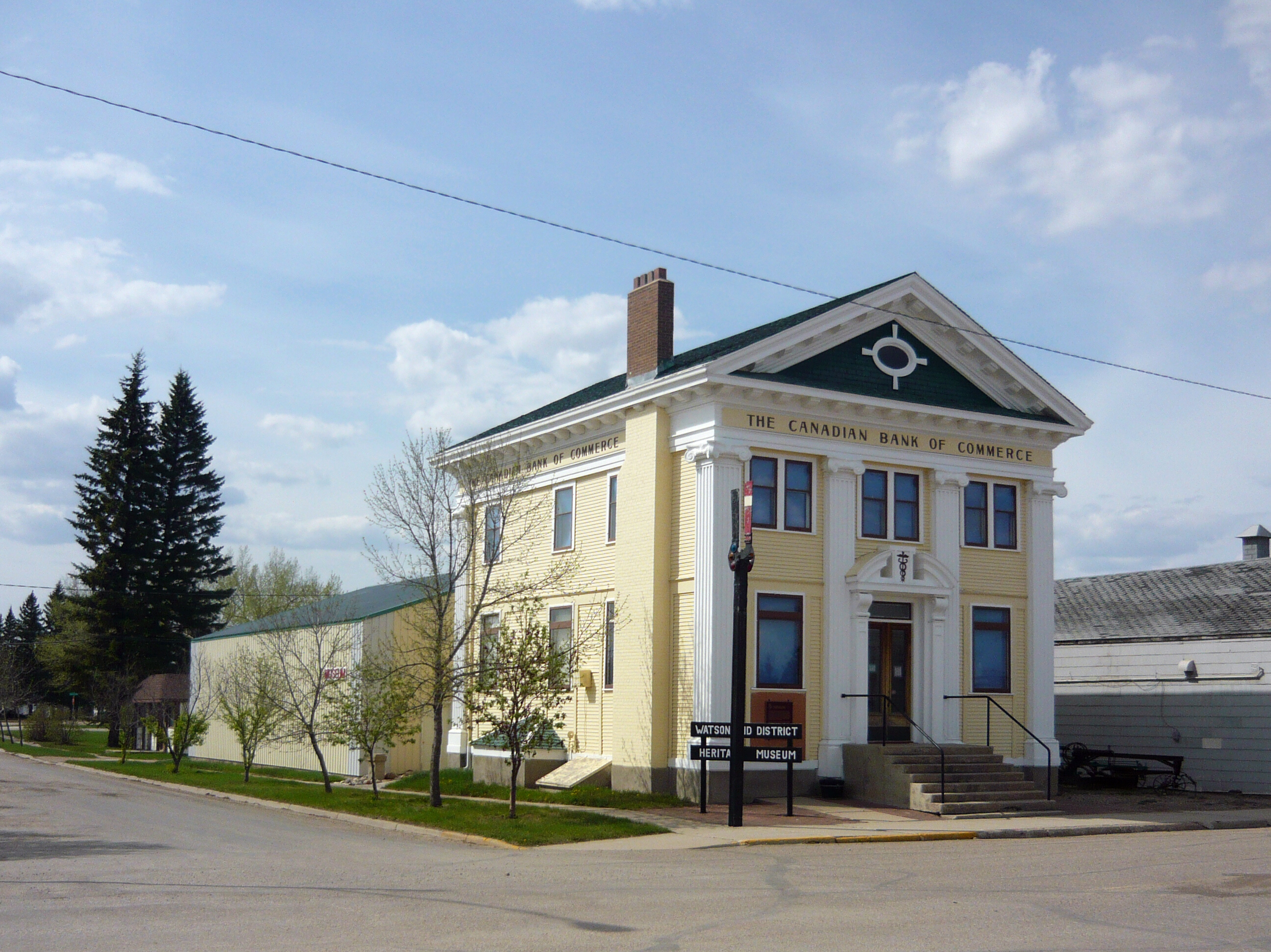
Canadian Bank of Commerce
Watson, Saskatchewan

Flavelle House, home of the University of Toronto's Faculty of Law, Toronto

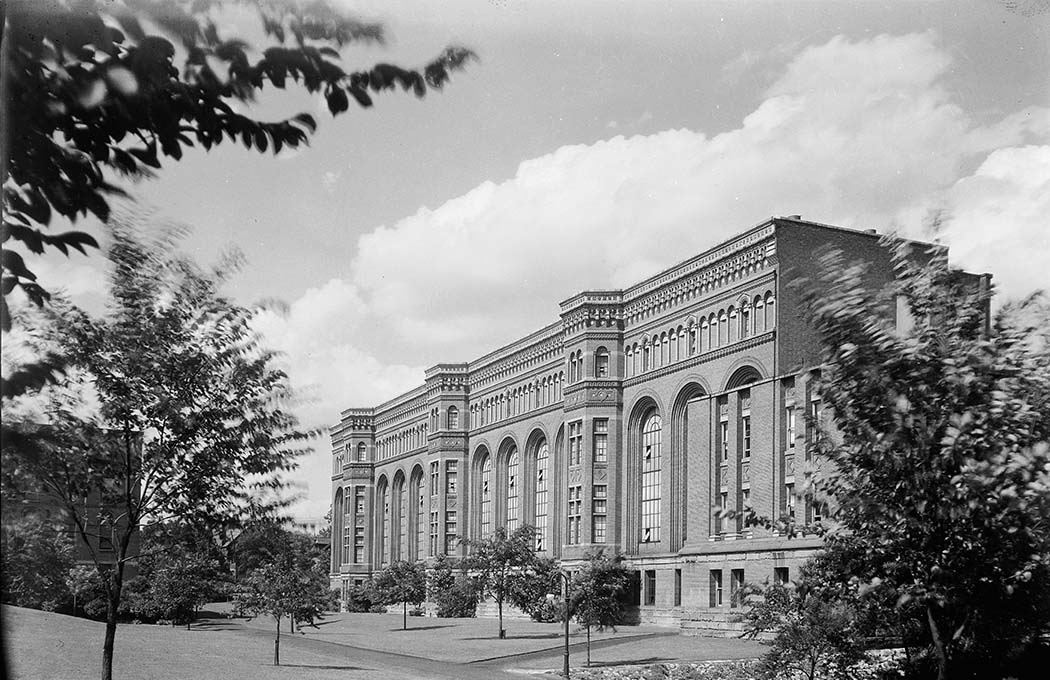
The 1914 Italianate-Neo-Romanesque Royal Ontario Museum original building in 1922

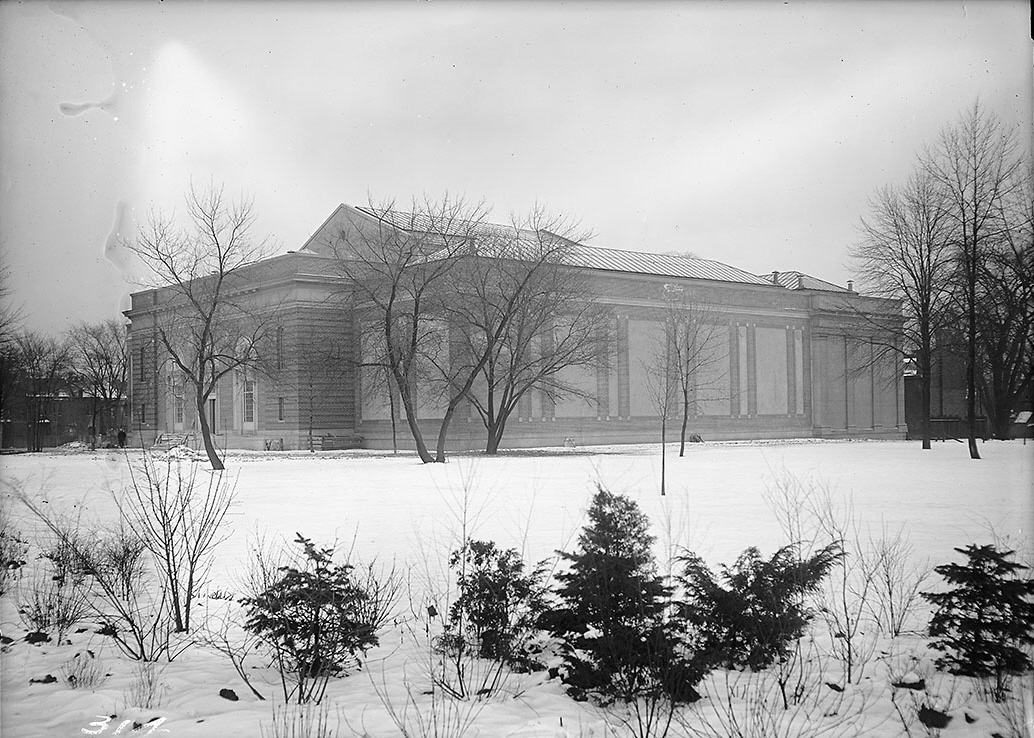
AGO original wing, Toronto

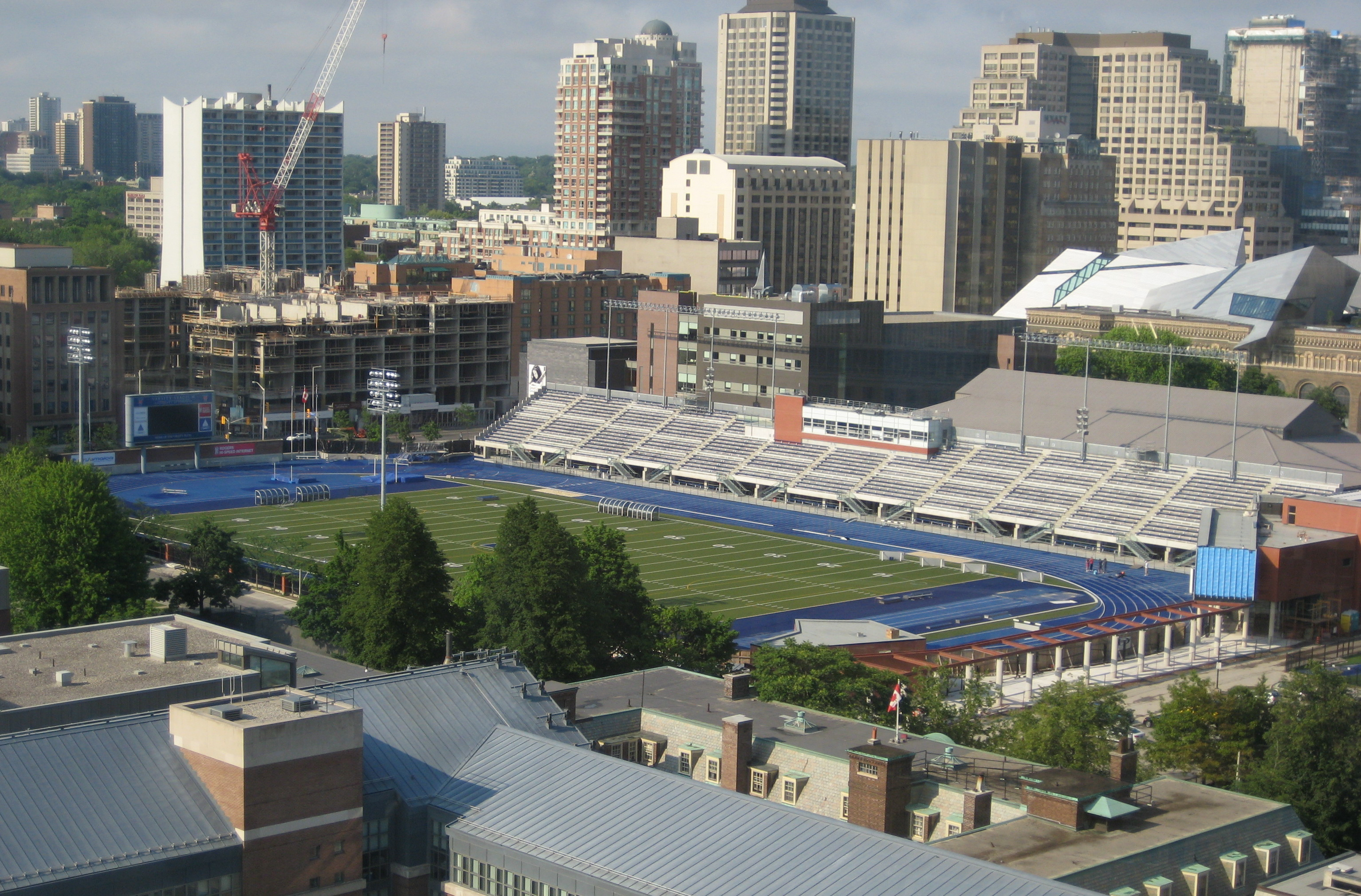
Varsity Arena roof behind Varsity Centre seating, Toronto

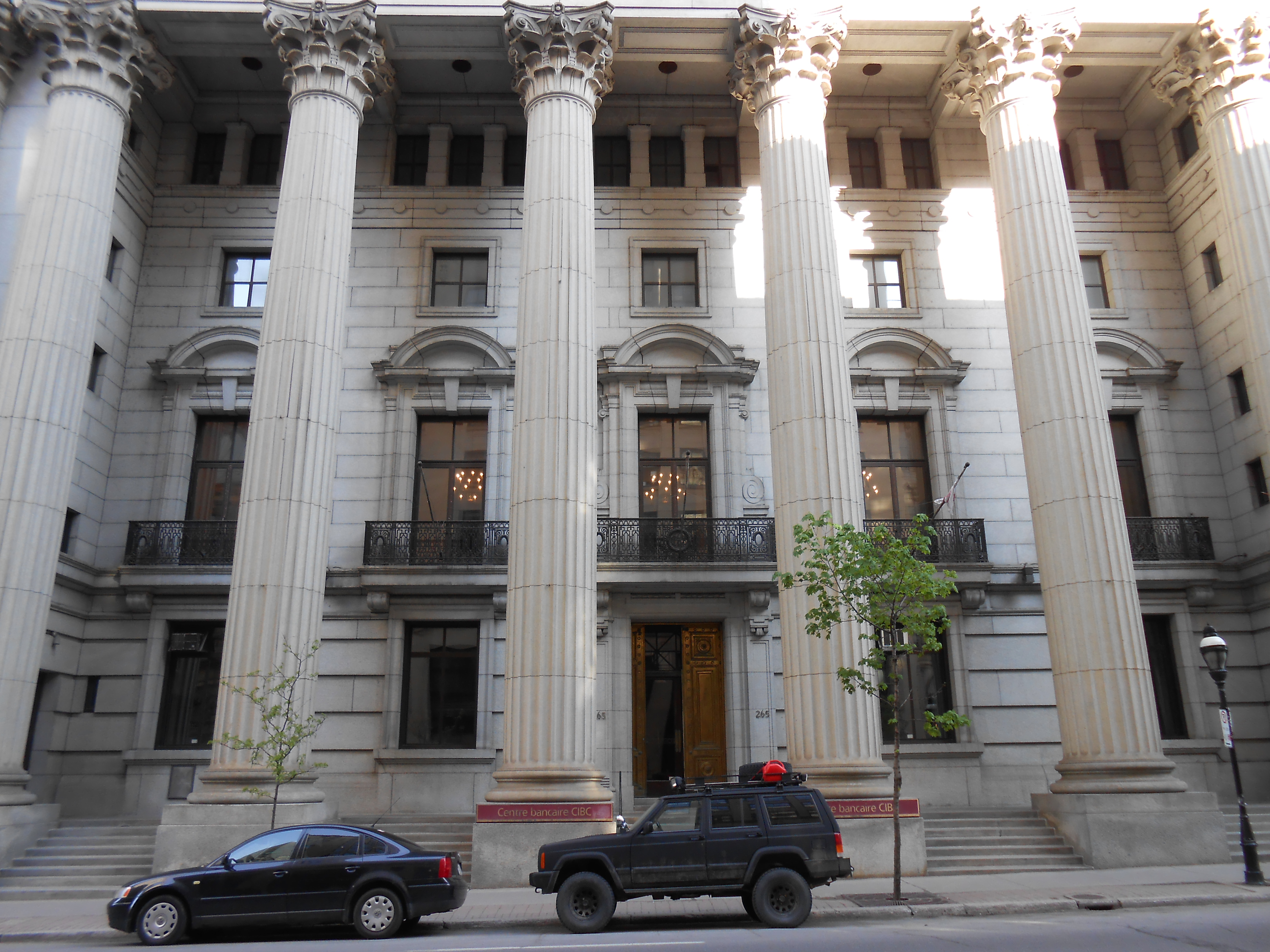
Canadian Bank of Commerce, Montreal

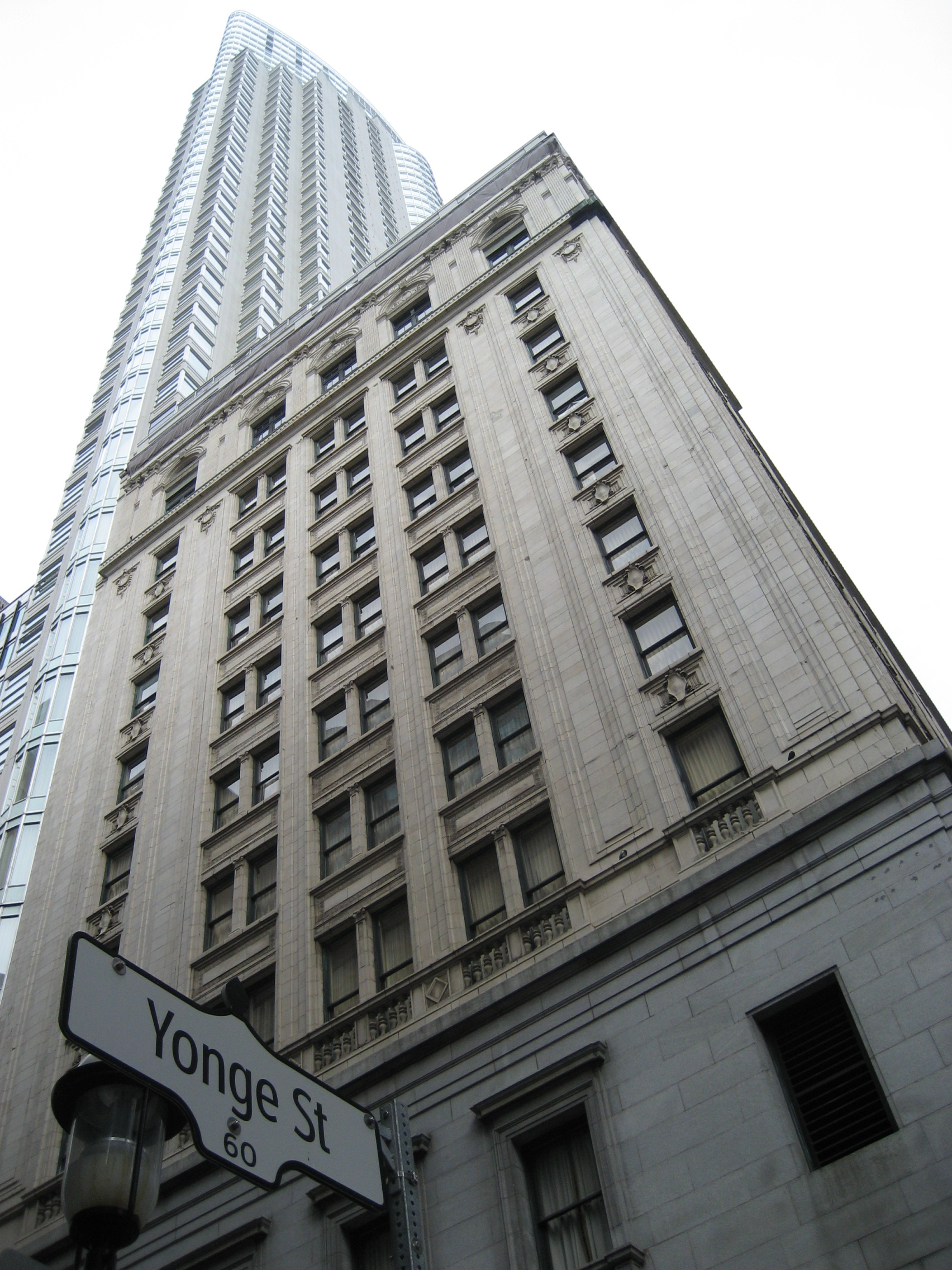
One King Street West, Toronto

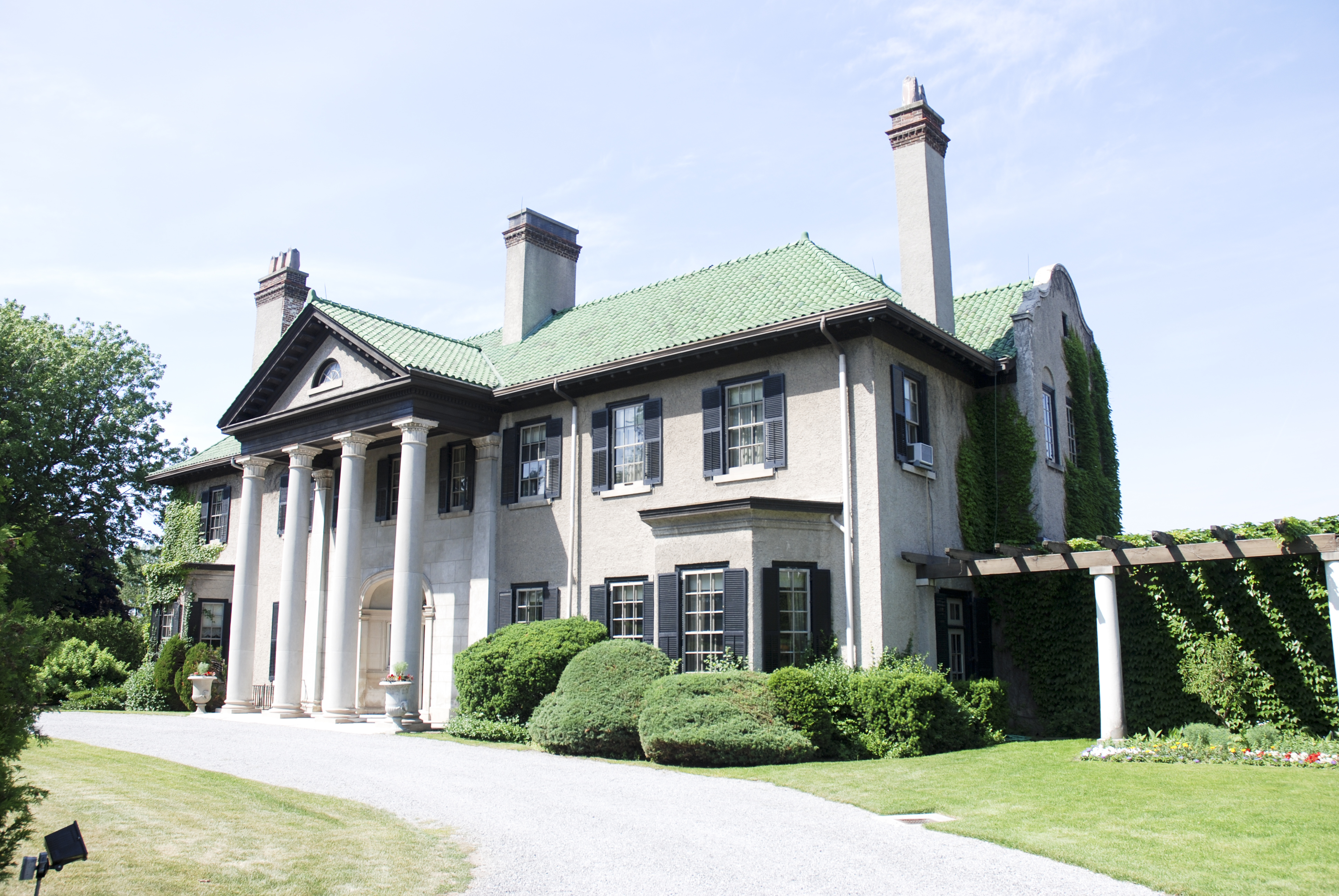
Parkwood Estate, Oshawa

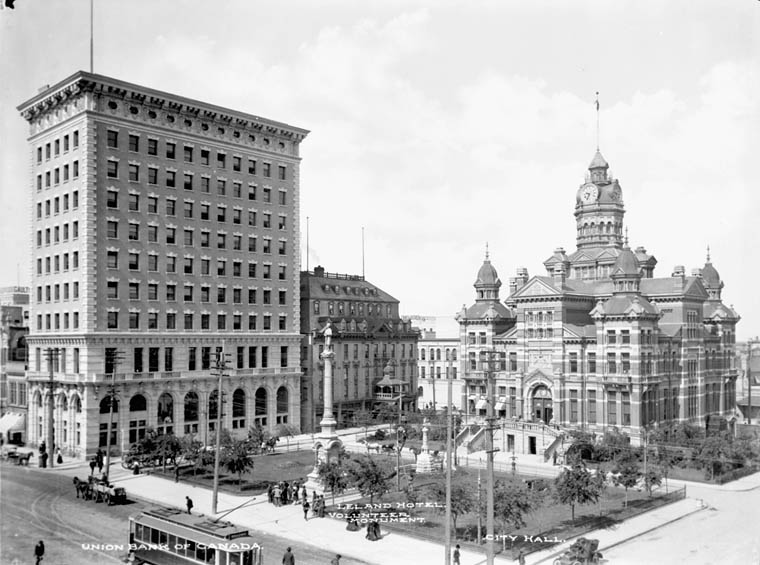
Union Bank of Canada on the left, in Winnipeg, Manitoba
