= Five Roses Flour =

Canadian brand of flour

Five Roses Flour is a Canadian brand of flour originally established and owned by the Lake of the Woods Milling Company in 1888. In 1954, the Five Roses brand with the Lake of the Woods Milling Company were taken over by Ogilvie Flour Mills. ADM bought the company in 1994, and the Five Roses brand was sold to The J.M. Smucker Company in 2006.

== Five Roses sign ==
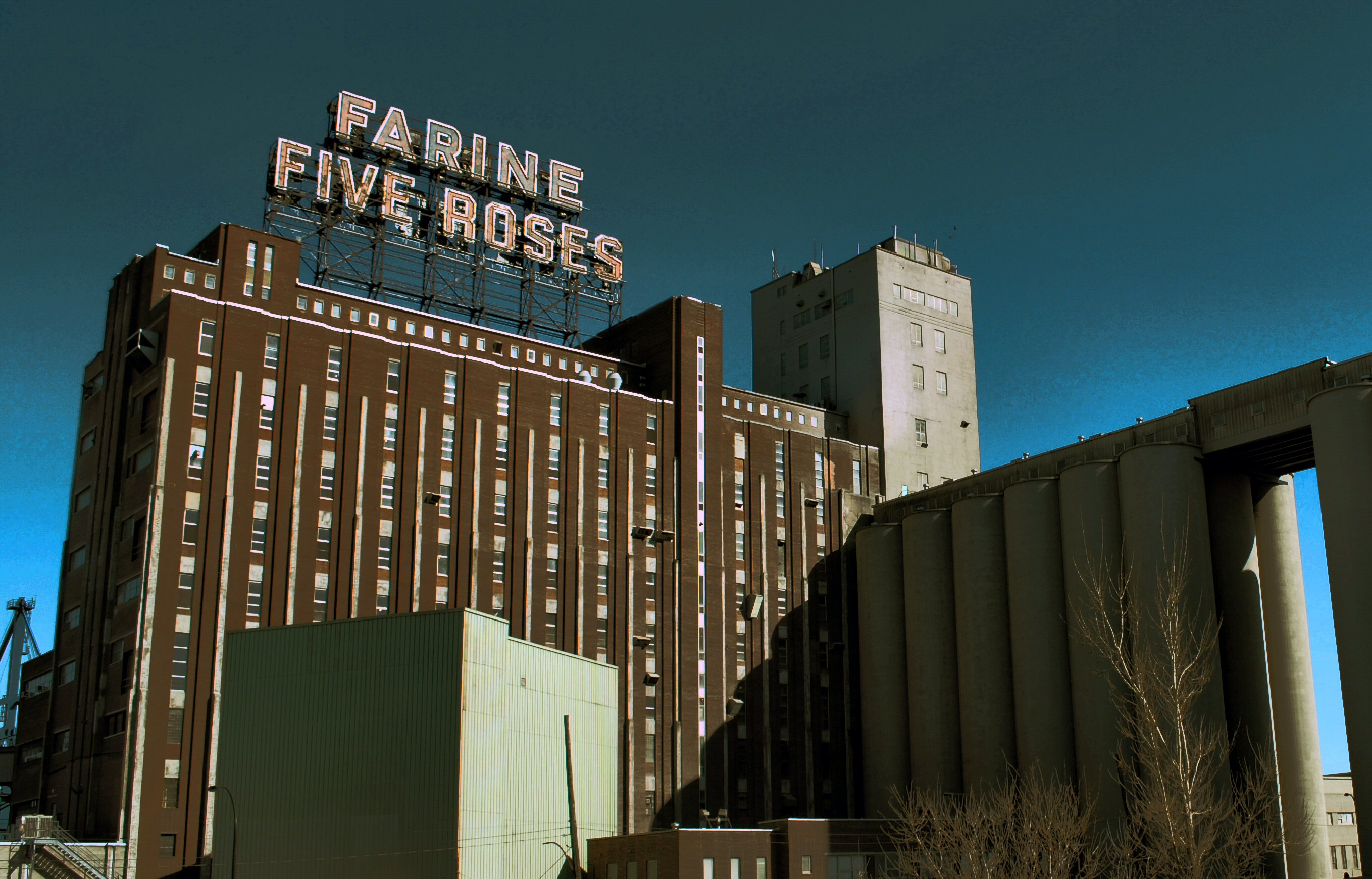
Five Roses Flour in Montreal

The Farine Five Roses sign is a feature of the Montreal skyline, first erected above the Ogilvie flour mill in 1948. The sign faced uncertainty when the Five Roses brand was sold in 2006, as ADM still owned the mill and had little interest in promoting a brand it no longer owned. However, Smucker has spent nearly a million dollars to maintain the sign and keep it lit. The sign was designated by the Montreal borough of Ville-Marie as a protected architectural feature in 2020. The sign has been incorporated into the branding of Montreal Roses FC of the Northern Super League.

== Five Roses Cookbook ==
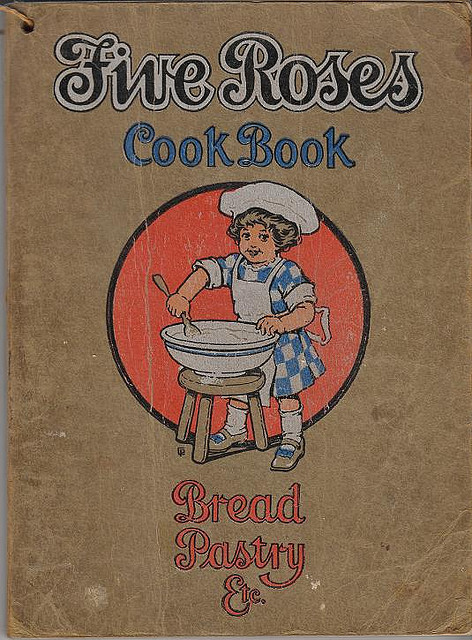
Five Roses CookBook

The Five Roses Cook Book was first published in 1913 by Lake of the Woods Milling Company. It is the longest-running recipe collection from a Canadian flour company. The cookbook features Five Roses flour. In 2003, a version of the 1967 edition was produced with an introduction outlining the cookbook's history written by Elizabeth Driver, a food historian who has written extensively on cookbooks. The original edition had recipes submitted by women in a contest run by the Lake of the Woods Milling Company and cost approximately 40 cents.
