= Canadian Bank of Commerce (Watson, Saskatchewan) =

Building in Saskatchewan, Canada

Coordinates: 52.1291°N 104.5238°W

Canadian Bank of Commerce Watson, Saskatchewan
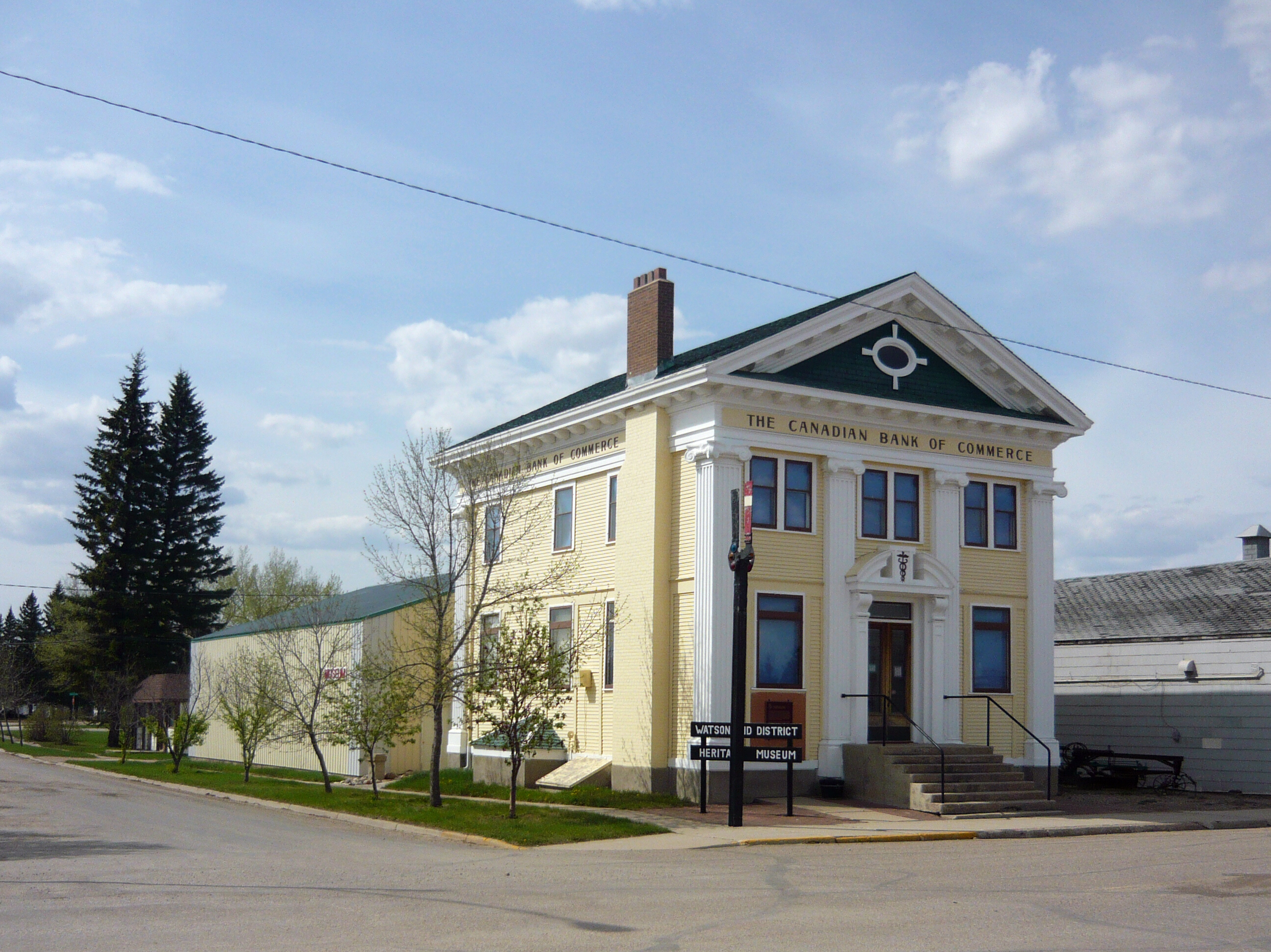
- Interactive map of the Canadian Bank of Commerce; Watson, Saskatchewan area

General information
- Architectural style: Greek Revival
- Location: Watson, Saskatchewan, Canada
- Completed: 1906

Design and construction
- Architect: Pearson and Darling

National Historic Site of Canada
- Designated: 1997

The Canadian Bank of Commerce in Watson, Saskatchewan, was constructed in 1906 in a Greek Revival style to house a branch of the Canadian Bank of Commerce. The Toronto firm of Pearson and Darling served as architects. This building was designated a National Historic Site of Canada in 1977 and currently houses the Watson and District Heritage Museum.
