= Moose Jaw Court House =

Building in Saskatchewan, Canada

Coordinates: 50.3937°N 105.5371°W

- Interactive map of the Moose Jaw Court House area

General information
- Architectural style: Neo-Classical
- Location: 64 Ominica Street West, Moose Jaw, Saskatchewan, Canada
- Construction started: 1908
- Completed: 1909

Design and construction
- Architect: Darling and Pearson

National Historic Site of Canada
- Official name: Moose Jaw Court House National Historic Site of Canada
- Designated: 1981

The historic Moose Jaw Court House building ed in downtown Moose Jaw, Saskatchewan, Canada. It is a two-story building of steel, hydraulic-pressed brick and Bedford Stone, trimmed with Indiana Limestone. It is the oldest continuously functioning provincial courthouse in the province. It has been designated a National Historic Site of Canada and a Provincial Heritage Property.
