= Oxbow complex =

Late Archaic complex in the Northern Great Plains

The Oxbow Complex is a Late Archaic period complex situated in the Northern Great Plains that lasted from about 5200 to 3800 BP. Their points are concave, and are designed for atlatls. They hunted bison, elk, geese, and bear. The complex was defined by archaeologists Boyd Wettlaufer and William Mayer-Oakes in 1960. The Oxbow complex is connected to the Gowen complex, which is believed to have existed between 6100 and 5200 BP.

== Tools ==
The Oxbow projectile point is distinguished by its concave base, rounded "ears", and side notching. These points were attached to atlatls and resharpened. Fire-cracked rocks are commonly found in Oxbow sites; it is believed these rocks were used for boiling water.
