= Wollenberg =

Wollenberg may refer to:

- Albert Charles Wollenberg (1900–1981), American judge
- Erich Wollenberg (1892–1973), German communist and journalist
- Wollenberg (hill), in Hesse, Germany
- Wollenberg Grain and Seed Elevator, in Buffalo, New York
