= List of grain elevators =

This is a list of notable grain elevators.

== Canada ==
=== Alberta ===
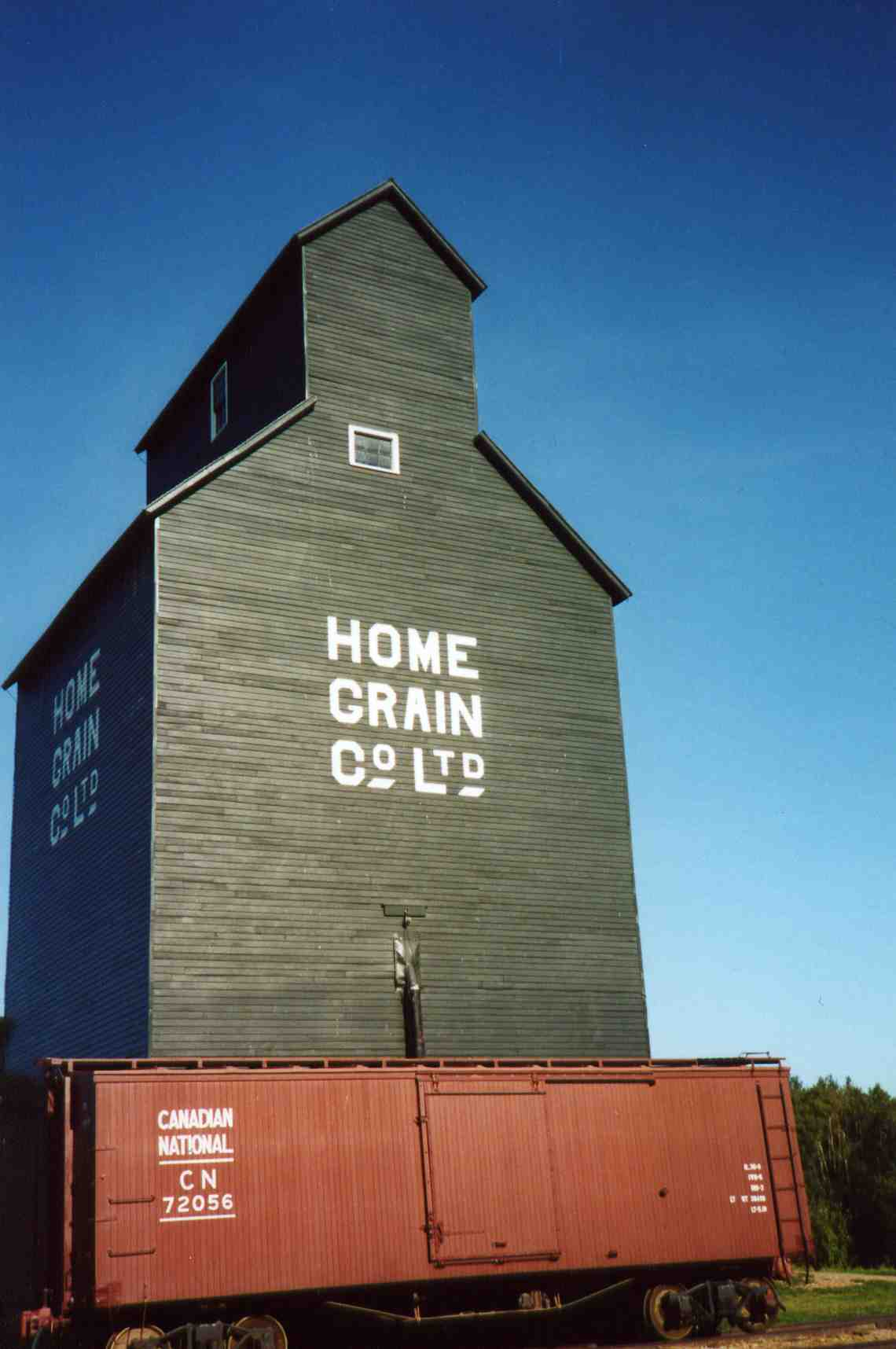
Home Grain Co. wooden cribbed elevator at the Ukrainian Cultural Heritage Village in Alberta, Canada.

- Acadia Valley – Prairie Elevator Museum, former Alberta Wheat Pool converted into a tea house / museum.
- Alberta Central Railroad Museum – former Alberta Wheat Pool, second oldest standing grain elevator in Alberta, moved from Hobbema.
- Andrew – former Alberta Wheat Pool, restored into a museum.
- Castor – former Alberta Pacific, restored into a museum.
- Big Valley – Alberta Wheat Pool used as a museum complete with a train station and Roundhouse.
- Edmonton – Ritchie Mill, former flour mill converted into restaurants, law offices and condos.
- Esther – former Alberta Wheat Pool, restored into a museum.
- Heritage Acres Farm Museum – restored United Grain Growers elevator moved from Brocket.
- Heritage Park Historical Village, former Security Elevator Co. LTD. moved from Shonts
- Kinuso – United Grain Growers with Original UGG Logo.
- Leduc – former Alberta wheat Pool saved from demolition now a museum.
- Mayerthorpe – 1966 Federal Grain Co. now an interpretive center.
- Meeting Creek, a refurbished Alberta Wheat Pool, Pacific Grain elevator and CN train station.
- Nanton – Canadian Grain Elevator Discovery Centre, three elevators saved from demolition and preserved to educate visitors about the town's, and Alberta's, agricultural history.
- Paradise Valley – operated as the Climb Thru Time Museum.
- Radway – Krause Milling Co. restored into a museum.
- Raley – oldest standing grain elevator on its original site in Alberta, built in 1909 maintaining many of its original features.
- Rowley – a United Grain Growers, and Alberta Wheat Pool elevators saved from demolition by locals and now fully restored.
- Scandia – 1920s Alberta Wheat Pool now a museum.
- South Peace Centennial Museum, United Grain Growers moved from Albright.
- Spruce Grove – Spruce Grove Grain Elevator Museum, 1958 Alberta Wheat Pool, saved from demolition and maintained as an operating museum.
- St. Albert – 1906 Alberta Grain Co. and 1929 Alberta Wheat Pool Elevators now restored.
- Stirling Elevator, near Stirling, Alberta, Canada, built 1998–1999.
- Stettler – 1920 Parrish and Heimbecker grain elevator / feed mill and coal shed, last to stand in Alberta, now protected and restored as a museum.
- Ukrainian Cultural Heritage Village – Former Home Grain Co. moved from Bellis
- Warner – Warner elevator row, last surviving elevator row in Alberta with a total of 3 elevators. Currently unprotected.

=== British Columbia ===
- Creston – former Alberta Wheat Pool (1936) and United Grain Growers (1937) elevators that still stand tall on the edge of the downtown core in the middle of the Creston Valley.
- Dawson Creek – restored and refurbished as a community art gallery.

=== Manitoba ===
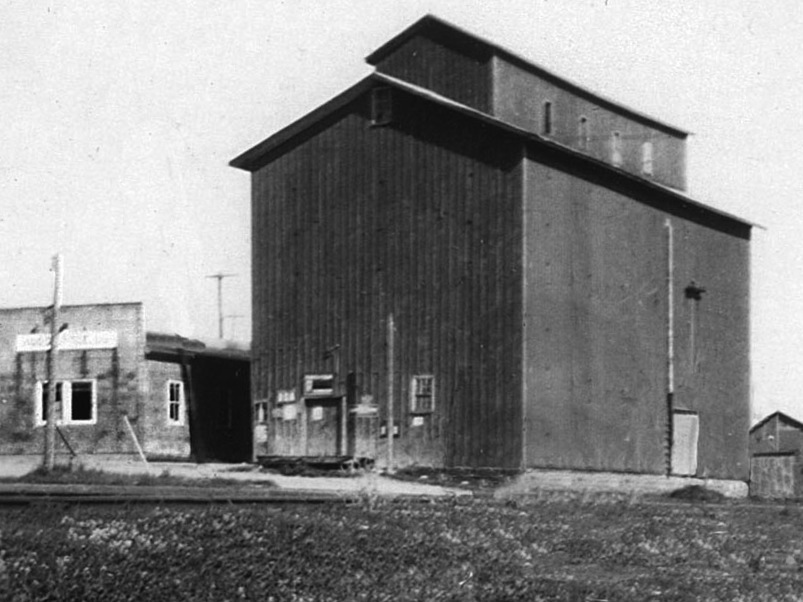
The Port Perry mill and grain elevator, circa 1930. Originally built in 1873, the building remains a major landmark to this day. The original line of the PW&PP Railway can be seen in the foreground.

- Inglis – Inglis elevator row, last surviving elevator row in Manitoba with a total of four elevators. Now designated and protected as a National Historic Site of Canada.
- Niverville – Western Canada's first grain elevator, erected by William Hespeler in 1879
- Plum Coulee – grain elevator refurbished as a restaurant and meeting rooms.
- Holmfield – Harrison Grain elevator and flour mill – still owned by the Harrison family

=== Nova Scotia ===
- Halifax Grain Elevator – in operation since 1925

=== Ontario ===
- Port Perry – formerly Curries Grain Elevator(1873)and A.Ross and son, Port Perry. Canada's oldest grain elevator or granary still stands as a sentinel on the edge of the Queen Street, Port Perry, Scugog the prestige shopping district on the shores of Lake Scugog. A must see for all old mill and grain elevator enthusiasts. This grain elevator is far older than those in Elva, Manitoba and Fleming, Saskatchewan by almost twenty years and the second oldest grain elevator in the Americas.

=== Saskatchewan ===
- Edam – former Saskatchewan Wheat Pool now a museum.
- Fleming – oldest standing grain elevator on its original site in Fleming, built in 1895 and maintaining many of its original features.
- Gravelbourg – Former Saskatchewan Wheat Pool saved from demolition and now a museum.
- Indian Head – experimental farm grain elevator refurbished as a Café, coffee house.
- Sukanen Ship Pioneer Village and Museum – former Victoria – McCabe moved from Mawer.
- Val Marie – former Federal and 1967 Centennial Saskatchewan Wheat Pool now museums.
- Western Development Museum, former Saskatchewan Wheat Pool moved from Keatley.
- Wood Mountain – former Saskatchewan Wheat Pool now a museum.

== United States ==
=== Illinois ===
- Archer Daniels Midland Wheat Mill, constructed in 1927, in Chicago's Fulton Market District.
- Armour's Warehouse, constructed in 1861–62 on the north bank of the Illinois-Michigan Canal in Seneca, Illinois.

=== Iowa ===
- Historic Ely Elevator, built in 1900, part of the Dows Street Historic District.

=== Maryland ===
- Silo Point, currently being reconstructed into a condominium from the former Baltimore and Ohio Locust Point Grain Terminal Elevator, one of the largest grain terminal elevators to be constructed in the early 20th century, with a capacity of 3.8 billion bushels in Baltimore, Maryland.

=== Minnesota ===
- Northwestern Consolidated Milling Company Elevator A, also known as the Ceresota Building and "The Million Bushel Elevator" was a receiving and public grain elevator built by the Northwestern Consolidated Milling Company in 1908 in Minneapolis, Minnesota.
- Peavey–Haglin Experimental Concrete Grain Elevator, St. Louis Park, Minnesota, USA, built in 1899–1900.
- Saint Paul Municipal Grain Terminal, in St. Paul, Minnesota, on the NRHP.

=== New York ===
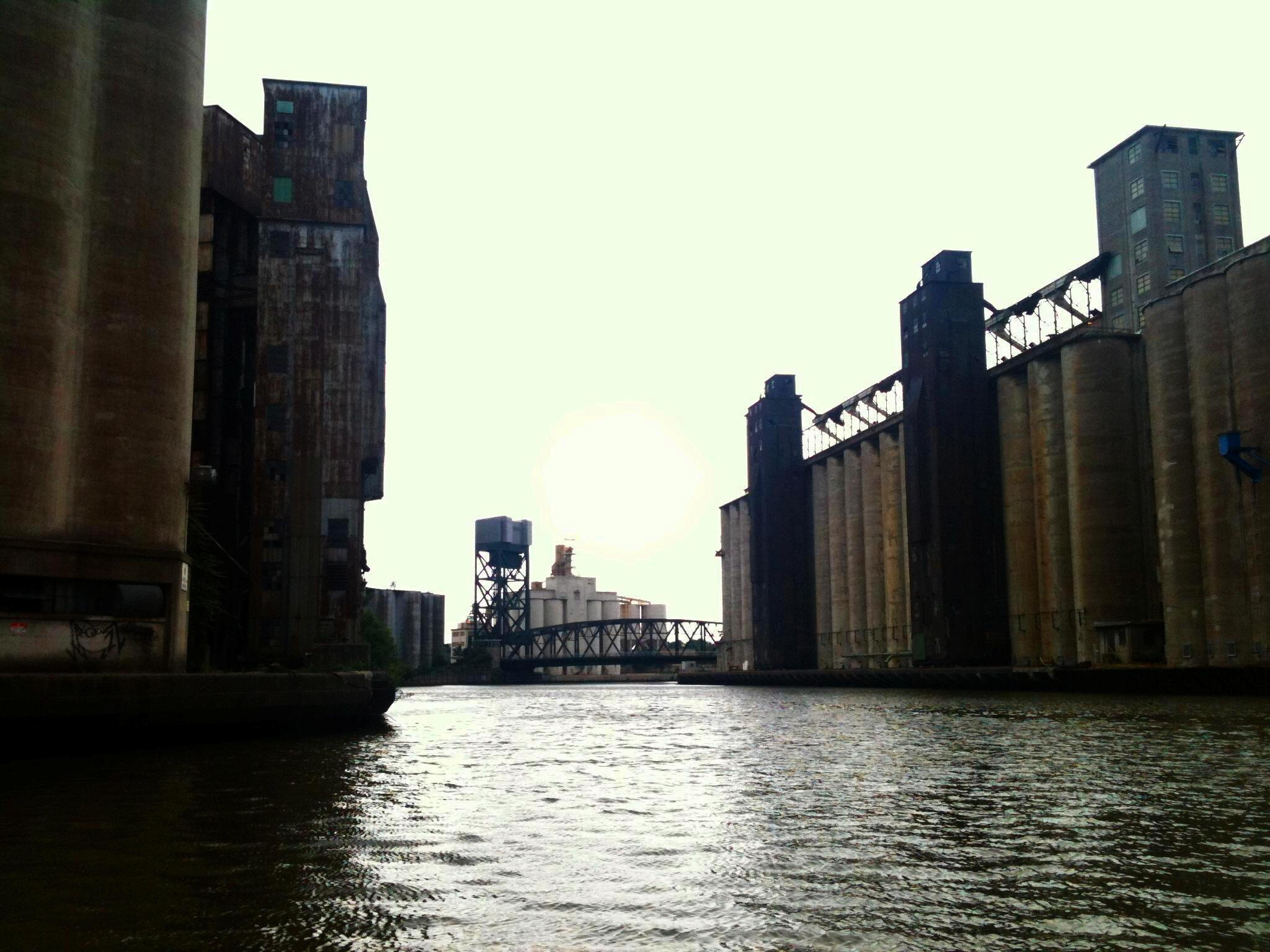
a photo along Elevator Alley in Buffalo, New York

- Cargill Pool Elevator, previously named the Saskatchewan Cooperative Elevator was built in 1925 offered a total holding capacity of 2.1 million bushels in 135 bins.
- Cargill Superior elevator, marked as Cargill "S", built between 1914 and 1925.
- Concrete-Central Elevator, Buffalo, New York The largest transfer elevator in the world at the time of its completion in 1917.
- Dart's Elevator, the world's first steam powered elevator – built in 1842.
- Great Northern Elevator, built in 1897 by the Great Northern Railroad.
- Wollenberg Grain and Seed Elevator, wooden "country style" elevator formerly located in Buffalo, New York; destroyed by fire in October 2006.

=== North Dakota ===
- North Dakota Mill and Elevator, largest flour mill in the United States, located in Grand Forks, North Dakota.

=== Oklahoma ===
- Bricktown, Oklahoma City, Oklahoma is home to OKC Rocks, a former grain elevator that has been turned into an indoor rock climbing facility located in Oklahoma City, Oklahoma.
- Ingersoll Tile Elevator, elevator constructed of hollow red clay tiles, located in Ingersoll, Oklahoma.

=== Pennsylvania ===
- Reading Company Grain Elevator, export elevator in Philadelphia converted into offices.
- The John Thompson Coal Sheds and Granary, the only wooden grain elevator in Pennsylvania. Located in Lemont, Pennsylvania.

=== South Dakota ===
- Zip Feed Tower, tallest occupiable structure in South Dakota from its construction in 1956–1957 until its demolition in December 2005.

=== Wyoming ===
- Sheridan Flouring Mills, Inc., an industrial complex in Sheridan, Wyoming.

== Switzerland ==
- Swissmill Tower – 118 metres (387 ft) high, rebuilt by April 2016 – Limmat Valley in the Canton of Zürich

== See also ==
- Storage silo
- Granary
