= Reading Company Grain Elevator =

- U.S. National Register of Historic Places
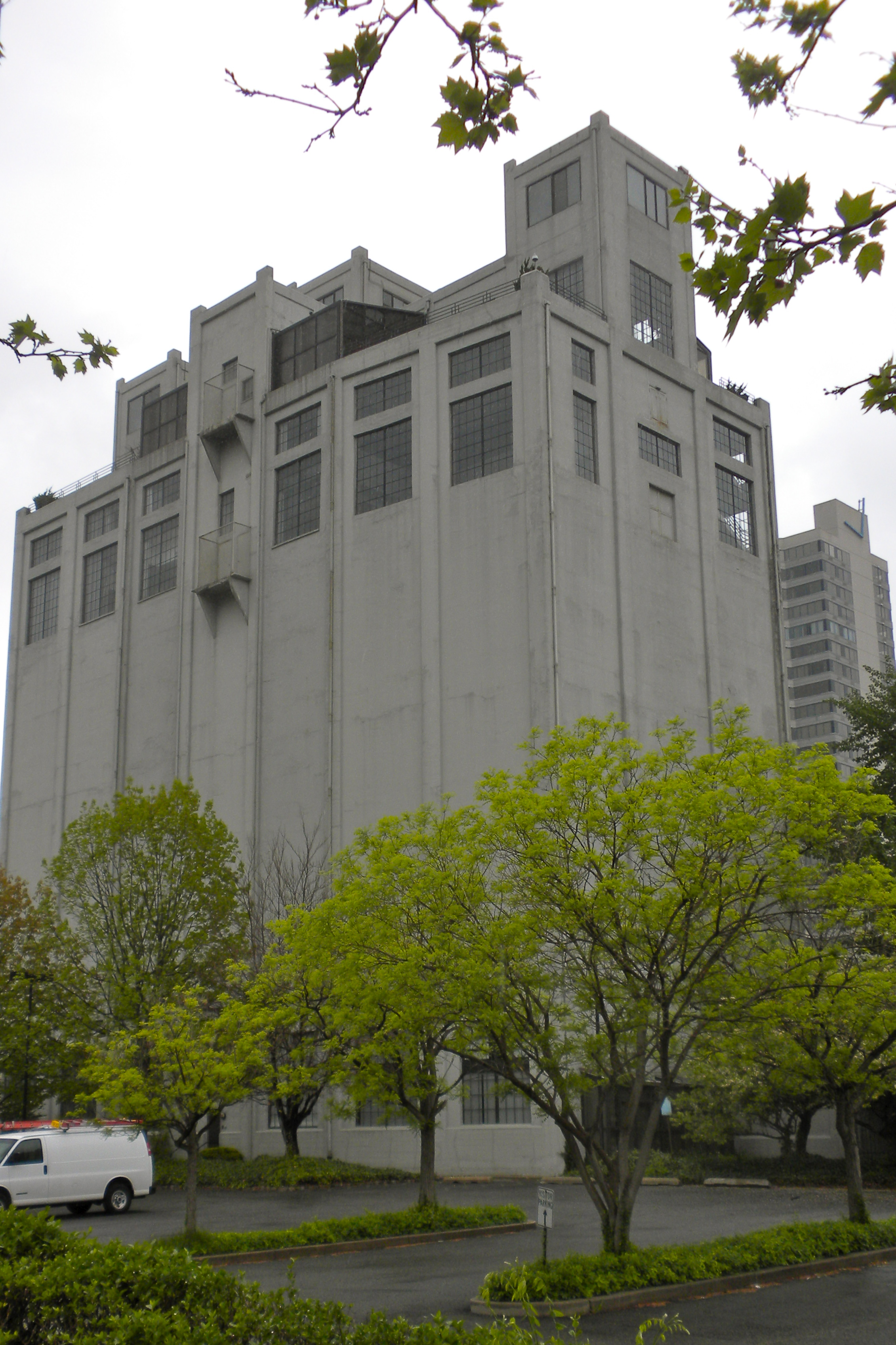
- The Reading Company Grain Elevator

- Location within Philadelphia Location within Pennsylvania Location within the United States
- Location: 411 N. 20th St., Philadelphia, Pennsylvania
- Coordinates: 39°57′40″N 75°10′18″W
- Area: less than one acre
- Built: 1925
- Architect: Reading Co.
- NRHP reference No.: 82003813
- Added to NRHP: March 10, 1982

The Reading Company Grain Elevator was built as a grain elevator in 1925 by the Reading Railroad in Center City Philadelphia to replace an elevator that had operated on the same spot since the Civil War. The building was abandoned in the 1950s and refitted in the 1970, with the lower floor made into offices, the grain storage areas essentially untouched, and the upper levels made into penthouses.

It was listed on the National Register of Historic Places in 1982.

== See also ==
- List of grain elevators
