= Spruce Grove Grain Elevator Museum =

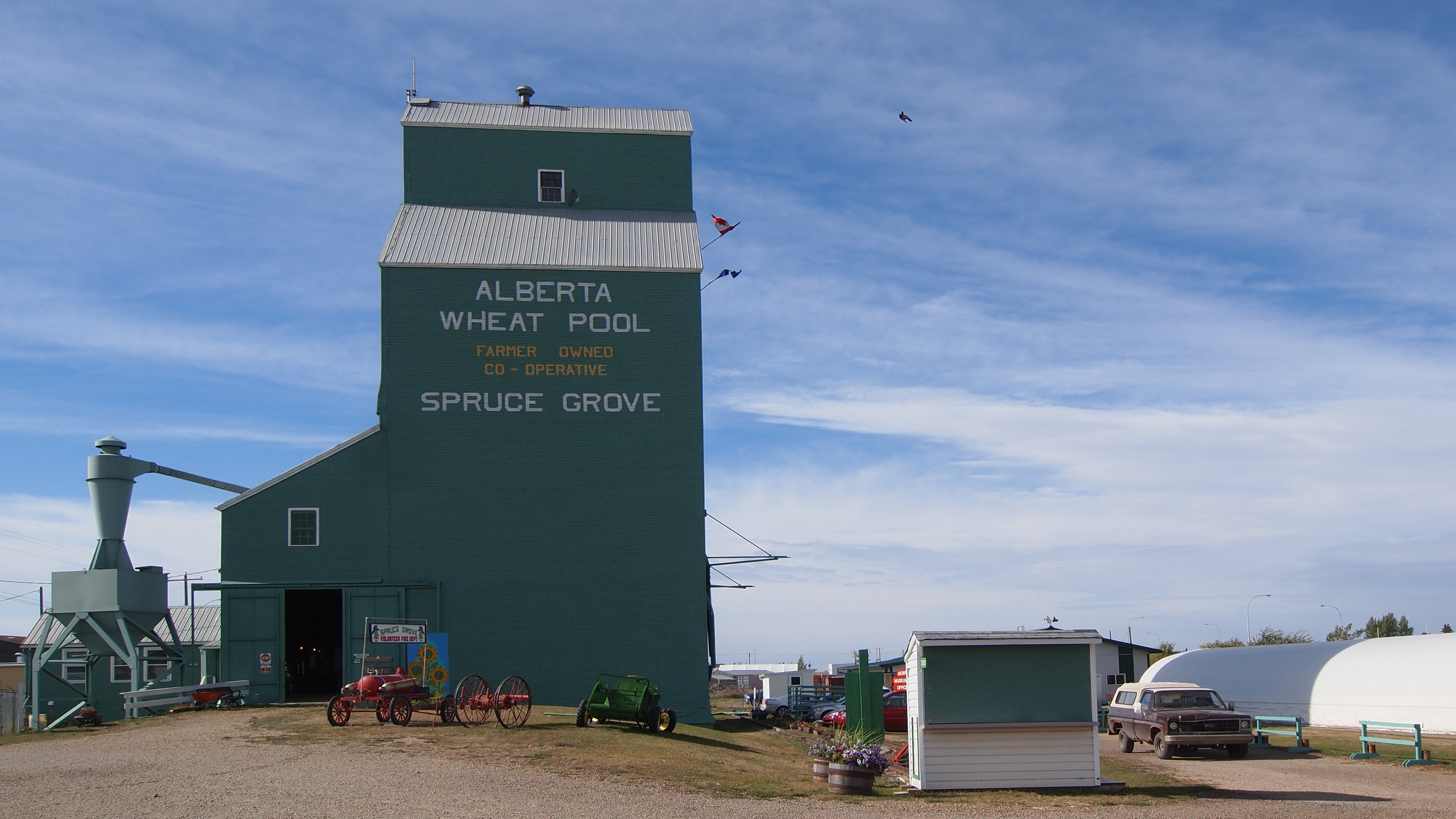

- Location within Alberta
- Established: 1995
- Location: Spruce Grove, Alberta, Canada
- Coordinates: 53.54019°N 113.90328°W
- Type: Farm history, farmers market, museum.
- Directors: Richard Lee, Elsie Rodeman, Ed Huber, Lorene O'Neill, Moira Juleff
- Website: Spruce Grove Grain Elevator Museum

The Spruce Grove Grain Elevator Museum is a former Alberta Wheat Pool grain elevator that has been preserved as a working museum run by the volunteers of the Spruce Grove and District Agricultural Society. The elevator stands within the city of Spruce Grove, Alberta, next to the Canadian National Railway and is the last elevator remaining heading west on the Yellowhead Highway and along the CN line.

== History ==
In 1933 there were 1800 primary elevators in Western Canada. But in 2003, there were only 389 and the number has continued to decrease. As of 21 April 2013, there were 313 known grain facilities in Alberta: 258 wooden, 42 concrete, and 12 steel elevators and annexes. In the city of Spruce Grove, only one grain elevator remained of three that had once been next to the railway; the other two had been destroyed in 1987 and 1991. The Spruce Grove and District Agricultural Society stepped in to prevent the demolition of the last elevator, buying it from Alberta Wheat Pool for a $1 along with the 1 acre (4,000 m^{2}) that the elevator sits on for $35,000. Through donations to the Spruce Grove and District Agricultural Society, they are able to fund the upkeep of this elevator. For example, community donations and government grants allowed the Spruce Grove and District Agricultural Society to repaint the exterior of the Grain Elevator Museum in spring 2012 for $70,000.

== Spruce Grove and District Agricultural Heritage Society ==
When the Spruce Grove and District Agricultural Heritage Society was initially organized, they built the Spruce Grove Agrena, a building which continues to serve the community today (hockey rink). The Ag Society sponsored and organized the Agra Fair, which grew to become one of Western Canada's largest events of its kind, which continued for thirty years. After the fair's closure, the Ag Society began its work on the grain elevator and the town water tower.

The organization is run by volunteer members. The goal of the Ag Society is to promote tourism by drawing visitors to a venue which provides cultural, educational, and interpretive information on agricultural processes and history, and the heritage of the Prairie region.

== Water tower ==
In 1957, a large water tower of 41,000 imperial gallons (190 m^{3}) capacity was set up at McLeod Avenue and Main Street in Spruce Grove. In June 1978, three years after Edmonton water was brought in, the water tower was sold and dismantled. Since then, the water tower lay forgotten and abandoned in a farmer's field, east of Spruce Grove and north of Highway 16A.

In 2010, the water tower was saved by the Ag Society volunteers and transported to the grain elevator site. The Ag Society volunteers, local businesses, and a donation by a local philanthropist were important for taking the first steps of restoring the water tower. In September 2011 work began, first with the sandblasting and undercoating of the tank.

The local mural artist, James MacKay of Outhere Art & Design, worked with the Ag Society volunteer committee to create a mural. The mural, which represents a 1958 Spruce Grove city landscape, was completed in October.

On November 8, 2011, the historic water tower was erected and placed back in Spruce Grove. "It kind of brings Spruce Grove alive," building Chairman George Sewell told CTV News. "We have nothing here in Spruce Grove that really tells the Spruce Grove story."

== See also ==
- List of grain elevators
- List of museums in Alberta
