= Canadian Grain Elevator Discovery Centre =

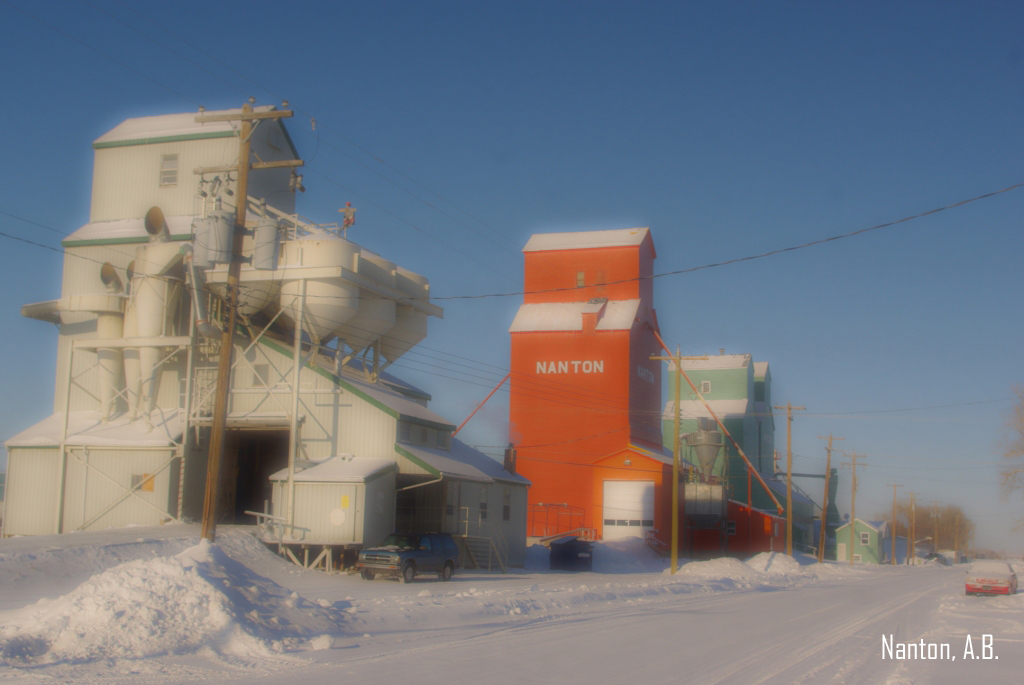
- Location: Nanton, Alberta, Canada
- Coordinates: 50.347°N 113.767°W
- Type: Agriculture museum
- Directors: Leo Wieser, Pam Woodall, Jennifer Duncan, Julia Anderson, Rachel Miller, Shanda Stelmach, and Lori Stuart.
- Website: http://nantongrainelevators.com

The Canadian Grain Elevator Discovery Centre is a set of restored grain elevators located in Nanton, Alberta, Canada. The centre's goal is to preserve examples of old grain elevators to educate visitors about the town's, and Alberta's, agricultural history.

== History ==
The northern twin elevators were built in 1927 to a traditional arrangement with an office building separated from the driveway and elevator by a raised access platform. It decommissioned in 2000 under the Alberta Wheat Pool. The southern elevator was built in 1929, gained a balloon annex in 1956, and was extensively remodeled in 1981. The elevators were served by the Canadian Pacific Railway's MacLeod subdivision until the subdivision's abandonment and track removal in 2002.

The local "Save One" historical society was formed to preserve at least one of the elevators from demolition. The society raised enough funds in three years to purchase the three elevators and the land they stood on. The restoration project replaced the railway tracks, and repainted the elevators in the Alberta Wheat Pool and Pioneer colours. The elevators form the Elevator Discovery Centre, and became a provincial heritage site in 2022.

The smaller Nanton Seed Cleaning Co. elevator is on the row but not part of the centre.

== Gallery ==
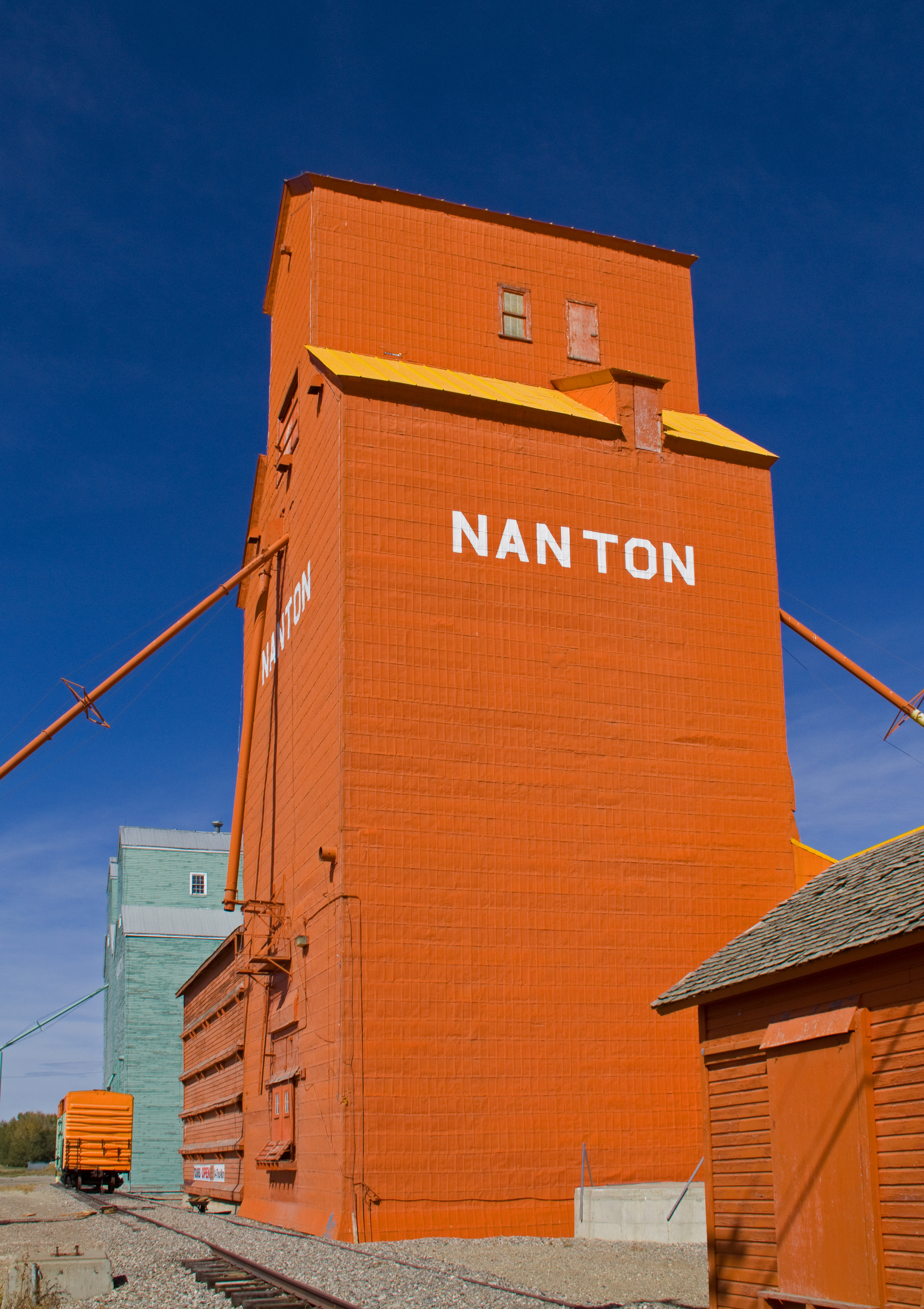
Former Pioneer elevator.

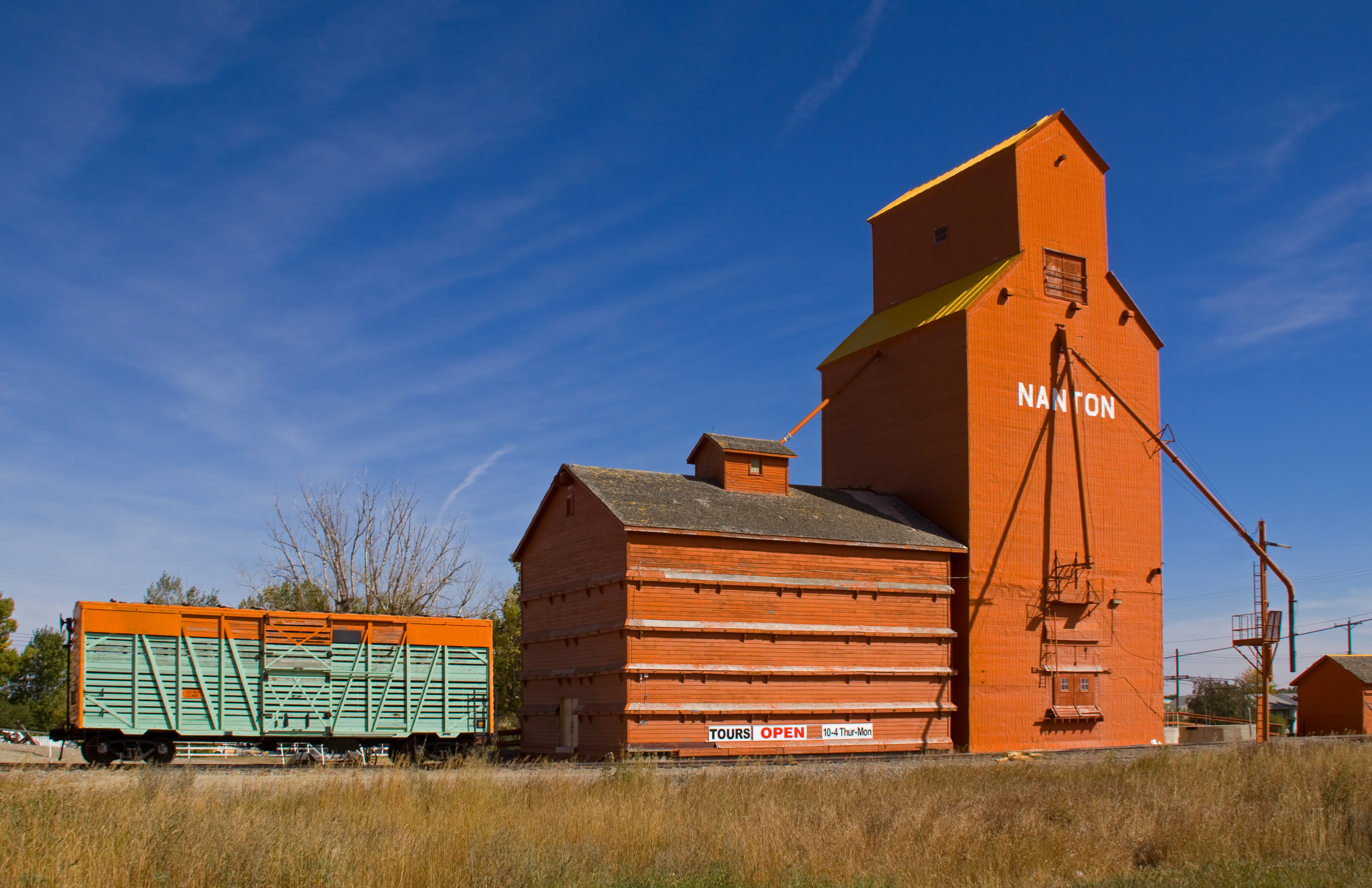
Former Pioneer Elevator.

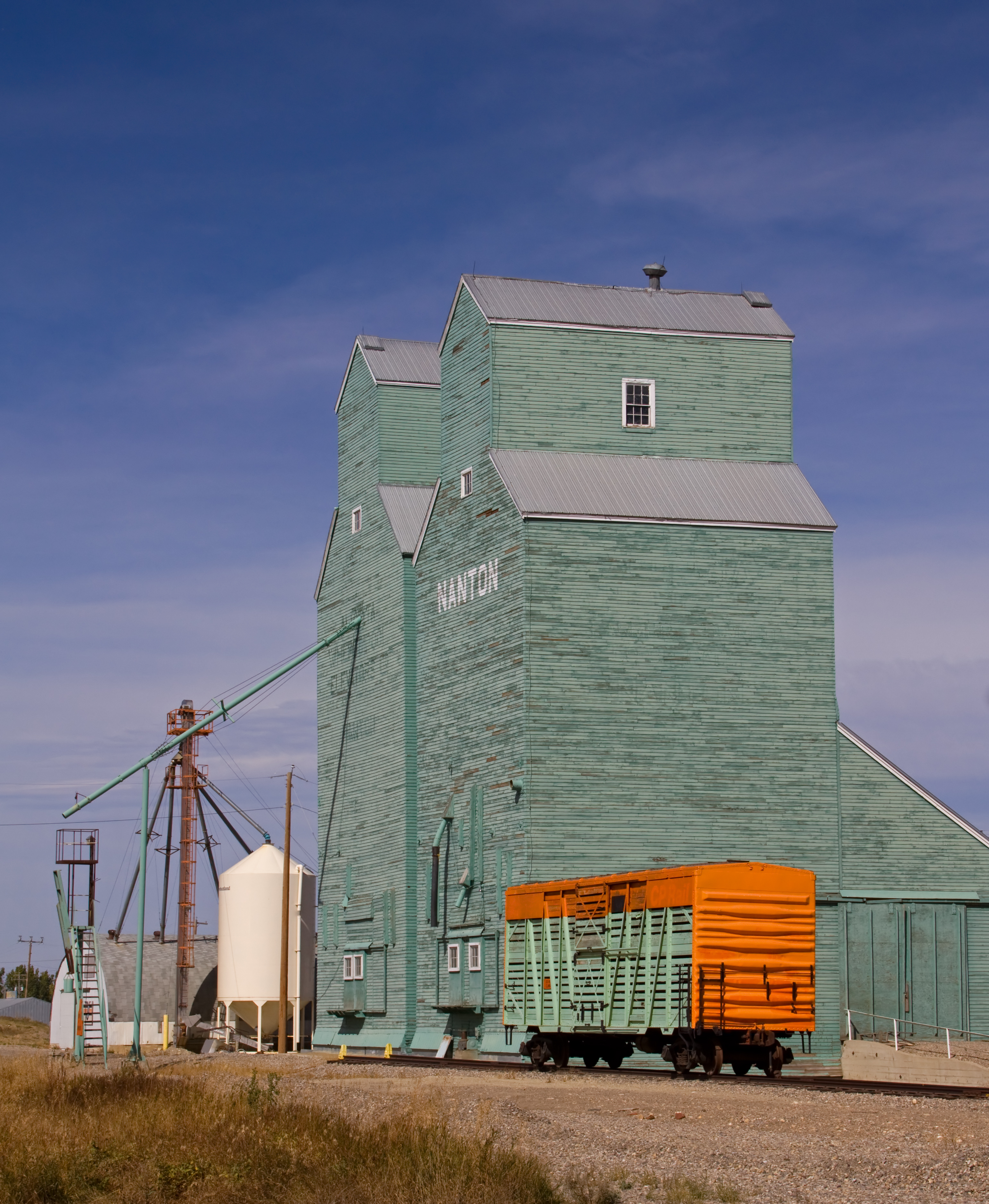
Former Alberta Wheat Pool elevators and box car.

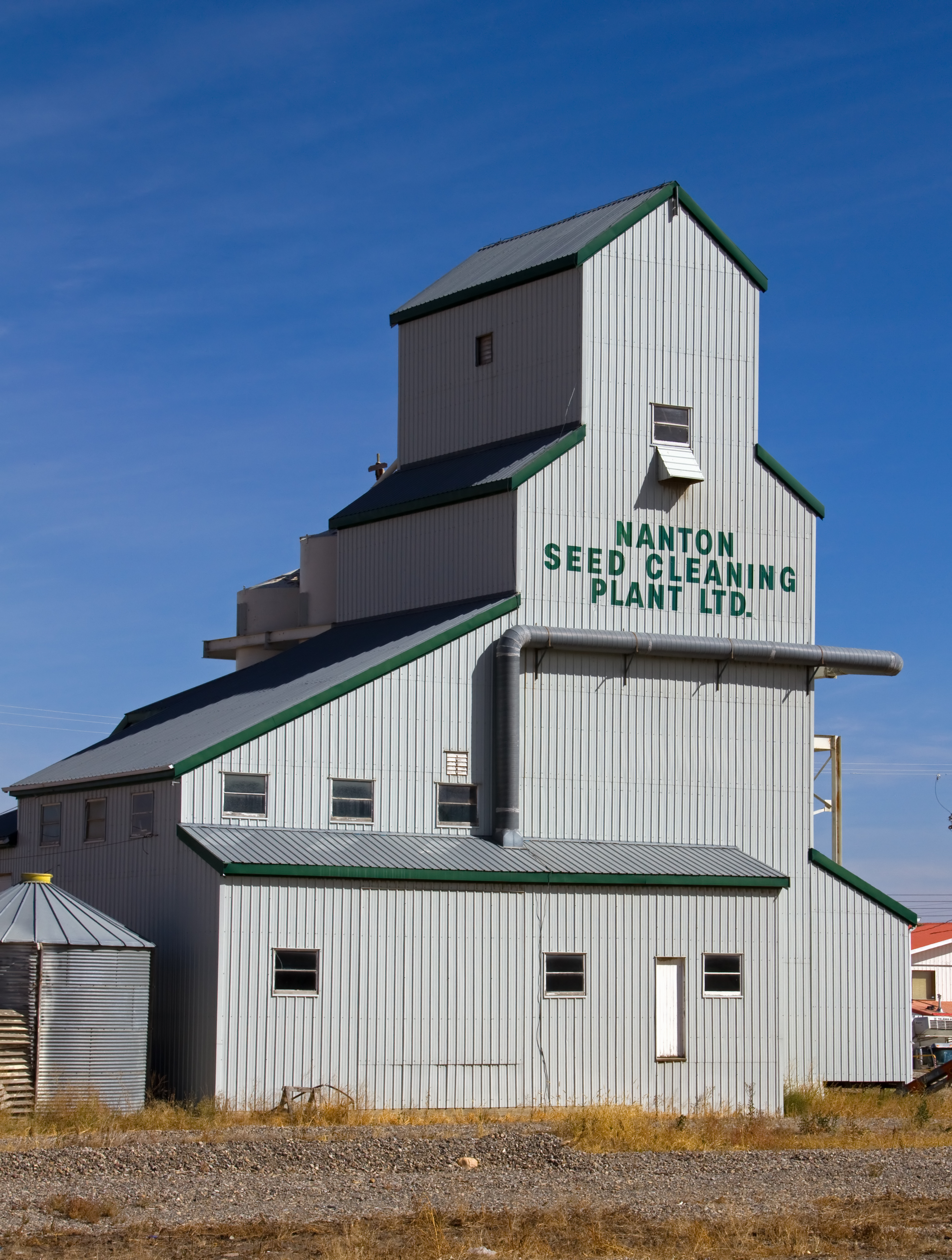
Seed cleaning elevator.

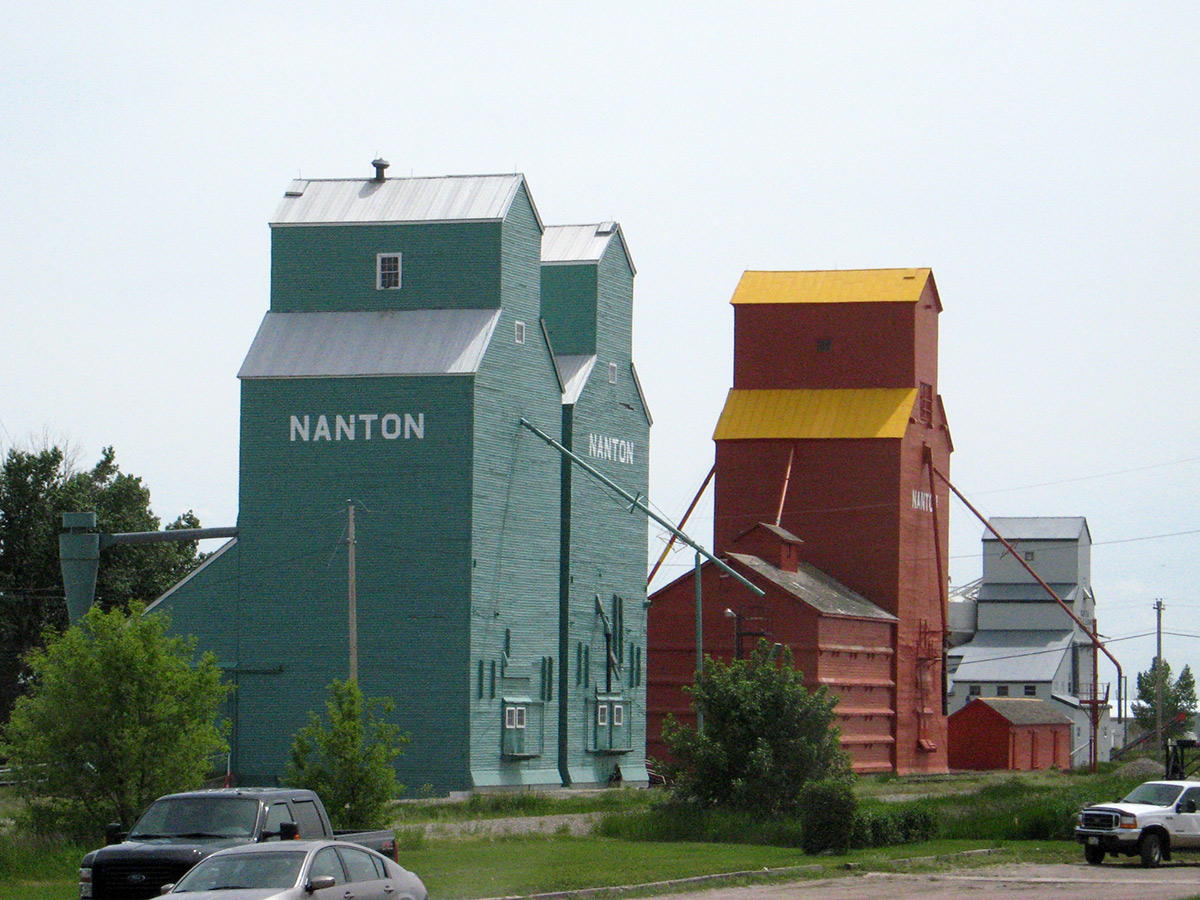
Elevators taken from the north.

== See also ==
- List of grain elevators
- List of museums in Alberta
