= Concrete-Central Elevator =

- U.S. National Register of Historic Places
- New York State Register of Historic Places
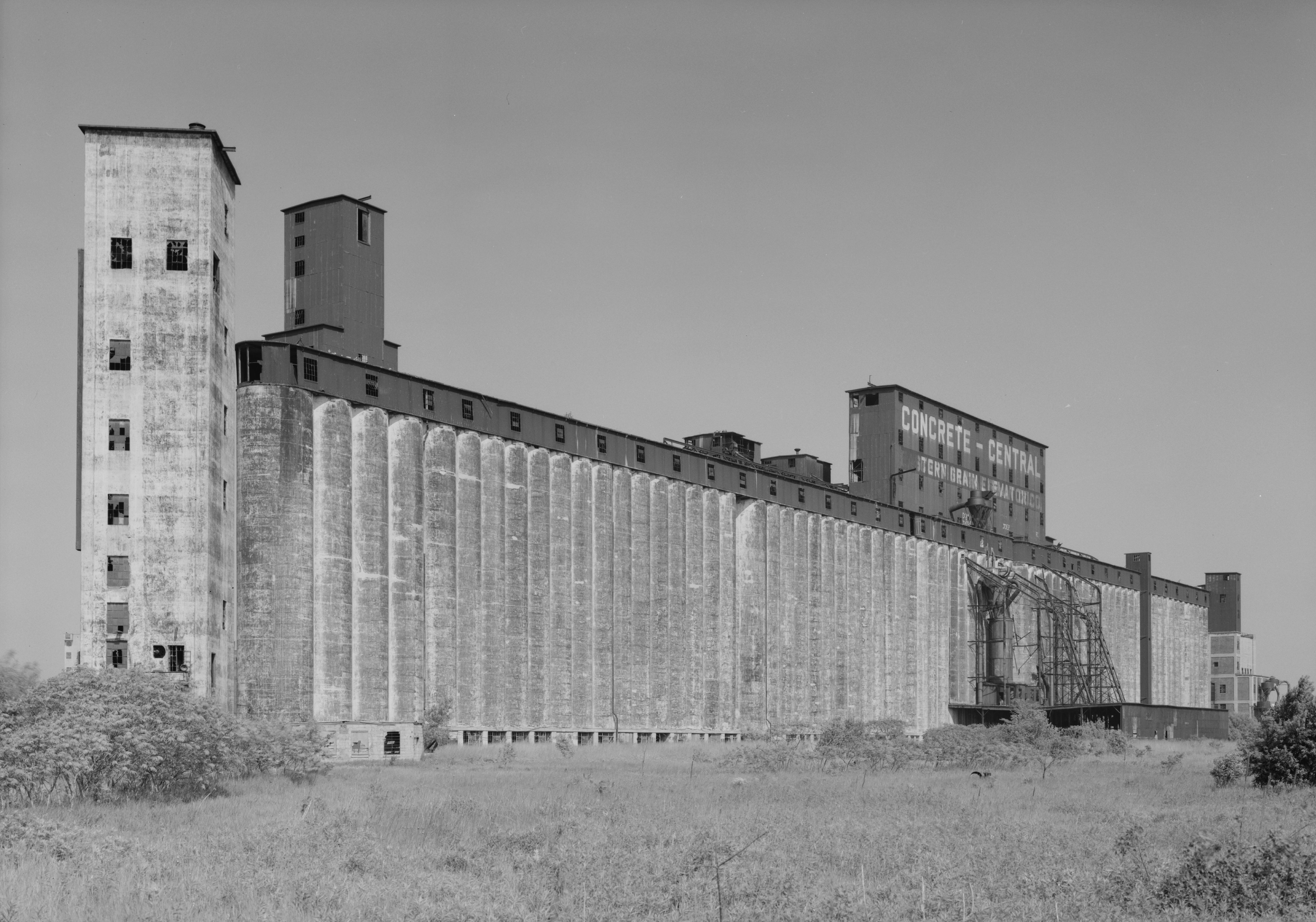
- Concrete-Central Elevator

- Location within New York Location within the United States
- Location: 175 Buffalo River, Buffalo, New York
- Coordinates: 42°51′37″N 78°51′20″W
- Area: 3 acres (1.2 ha)
- Built: 1915
- Architects: Wait, H.R.; Monarch Engineering Co.
- MPS: Buffalo Grain and Materials Elevator MPS
- NRHP reference No.: 03000410
- NYSRHP No.: 02940.023595

Significant dates
- Added to NRHP: May 19, 2003
- Designated NYSRHP: March 18, 2003

Concrete-Central Elevator is a historic grain elevator located on the Buffalo River at 175 Buffalo River (750 Ohio St.) Buffalo in Erie County, New York.

== History ==
Concrete Central was built between 1915 and 1917 at the height of World War I. Due to its being the largest grain elevator in the world and concerns about German sabotage, Concrete Central's method of construction was top secret. The facility was utilized for grain storage until 1966. Concrete Central stretches along the Buffalo River for almost a quarter of a mile and was the largest transfer elevator in the world at the time of its completion in 1917. It is also the largest elevator ever built in the Buffalo area. When in operation, it had the capacity to handle a total of 4.5 million US bushels (160,000 m^{3}) of grain. The elevator allowed crews to load and unload 20 railroad cars an hour, and three marine legs along the Buffalo River side could load and unload three massive lake freighters at one time.

== In the news ==
In 1976, a young boy was killed in a fall after climbing to the roof of the building. The City of Buffalo removed nearly all stairs from the multiple staircases in the structure to secure the building from a similar tragedy.

On May 28, 2013, at roughly 1630 hrs the Buffalo Fire Department received multiple reports of smoke showing from the roof of the Concrete Central main elevator. Due to the location of the grain elevator and no accessible roads to the complex, the Buffalo Fire Department requested Engine 20, the Edward M. Cotter (fireboat) to respond and extinguish the flames only. It took several hours but the fire was contained to small area of the roof and put out. Buffalo Fire Arson Investigators were investigating possible arson at the complex. No damage estimate was listed, and no injuries were reported.

== Location ==
The complex sits on a remote parcel, with the only land access attainable via multiple railroad bridges from the northside of the complex and one railroad service road. The complex is easily viewable from the Red Jacket Park located at the foot of Smith Street or for kayakers in the Buffalo River. This area, riddled with mostly inactive but a few operational elevators, is known as Silo City.

== Present day ==
Following 1966, Concrete Central changed ownership multiple times but sat idle. In 1975 Concrete Central was abandoned as a derelict property. Machinery, furniture and metal as well as other items have been looted from the building leaving it an unsecured empty shell to this day.

It was listed on the National Register of Historic Places in 2003.

== Gallery ==
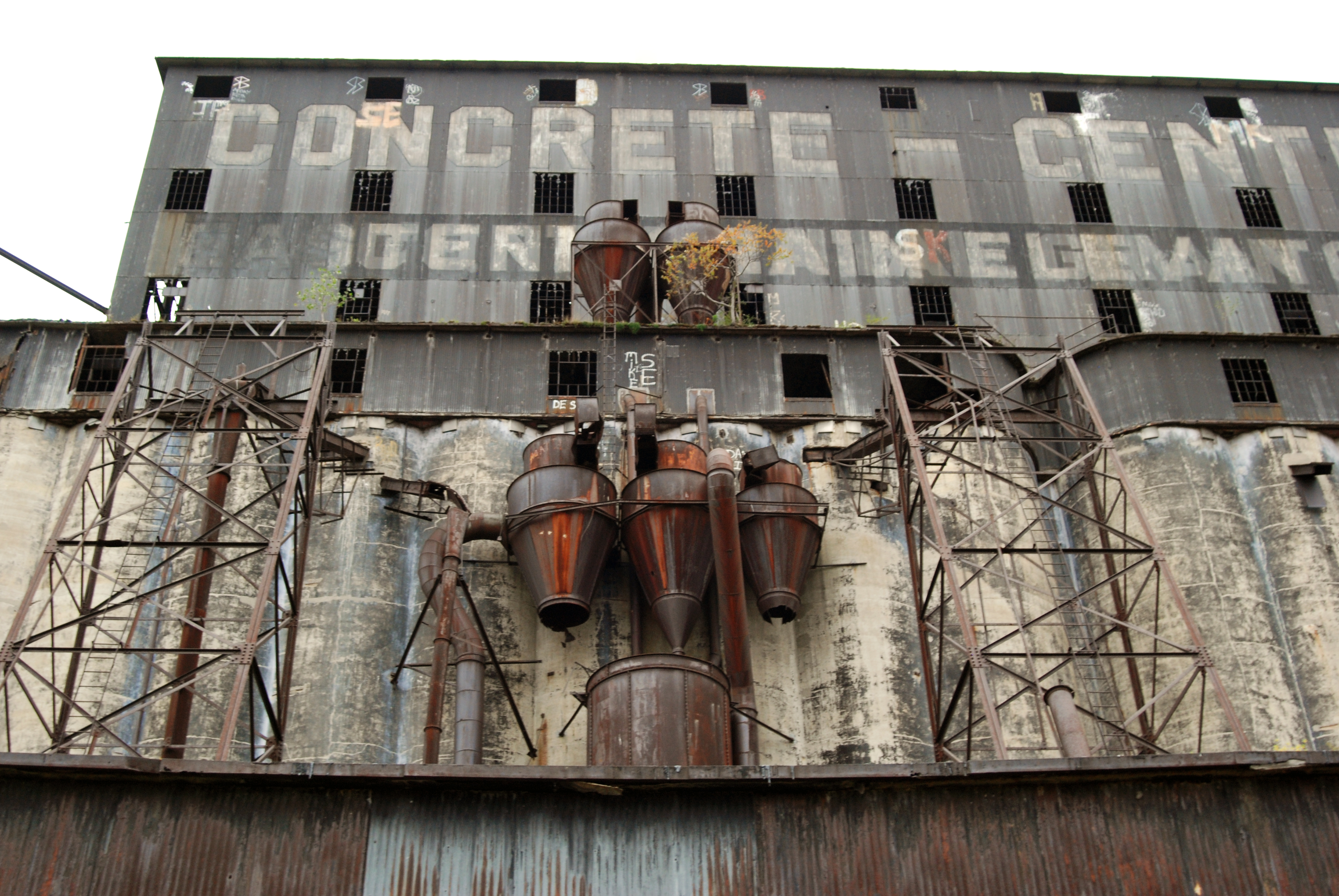
Workhouse

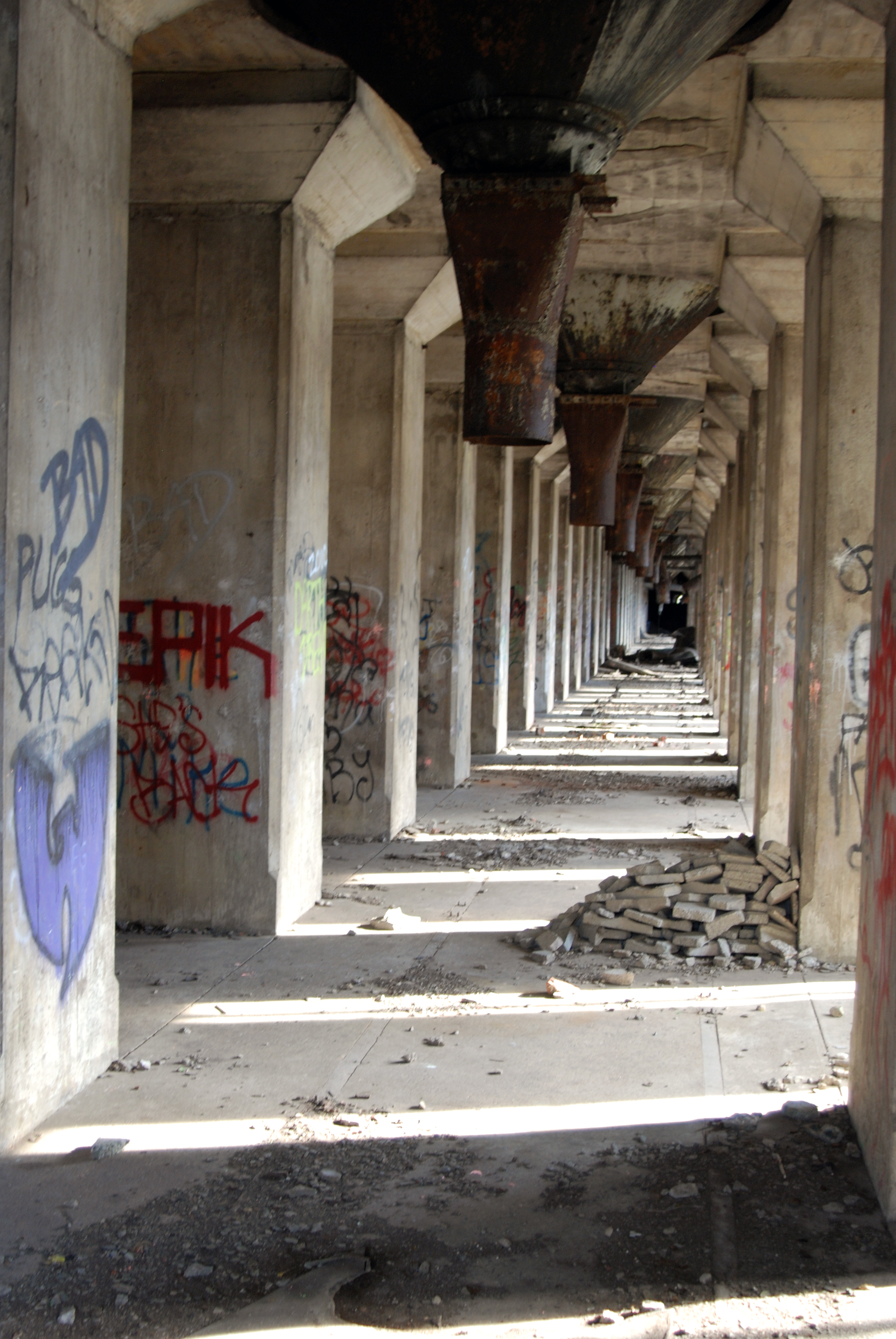
Basement

== See also ==
- List of grain elevators
