= Bomber Command Museum of Canada =

Aviation museum in Nanton, Alberta, Canada

- Established: 1986
- Location: Nanton, Alberta
- Coordinates: 50.350606°N 113.776594°W
- Website: http://www.bombercommandmuseum.ca/

The Bomber Command Museum of Canada, formerly the Nanton Lancaster Society Museum, is an aviation museum in Nanton, Alberta. The museum opened in 1986 and was founded to protect and restore Avro Lancaster FM159, one of 17 remaining Lancasters in the world, two of which are flying and two are taxi only. It has since grown to include a large collection of aircraft, many of which were used during the War by the British Commonwealth Air Training Plan.

== History ==
The Nanton Lancaster Society was formed in 1985 with the mission of preserving the town's Avro Lancaster, which had been on outdoor display since 1960. The following year, the society officially began displaying the aircraft as a museum. In 1991 the NLS completed a building to house the plane, and throughout the 1990s the museum acquired a large collection of aircraft to complement the Lancaster. Following the opening of the original building, the museum has expanded in 1998, 2002, and 2007. The museum includes a library, archive, and restoration shop. It is presently working to add second hangar for its collection.

Since 1986, the museum's Lancaster has undergone a full restoration, and all four engines are operational, and the aircraft can taxi under its own power, one of only 4 similar Lancasters in the world. The Society elected to restore the aircraft using the livery of Lancaster FM-159 (F2-T) "T for Tommy," the Lancaster in which Ian Bazalgette was killed on 4 August 1944. In 1990 the Society held a dedication ceremony for the aircraft. Among attendees were Mrs. Ethel Broderick, Ian's sister, F2-T crew members Chuck Godfrey and George Turner, as well as 407 Squadron's commanding officer, Colonel Terry Chester.

In 2005 the museum dedicated its Bomber Command Memorial, and in 2010 changed its name to the Bomber Command Museum of Canada. Now a nationally recognized museum working with other aviation museums in Alberta and Canada and hosting members of the Royal Canadian Air Force in recognizing the contribution of Canadian airmen and women during and after the second world war. In addition to its airplanes and vehicles, the museum has an extensive collection of engines, a significant collection of nose art pieces and documentation, and other related objects.

The museum acquired a Cessna UC-78 in 2018.

== Projects ==
Bomber Command Museum continues to develop its collection. Currently, in conjunction with the City of Calgary and the Calgary Mosquito Society, it is restoring Mosquito RS700 for display. Additionally, it is working with Halifax 57 Rescue to recover Handley Page Halifax HR871 from off the coast of Sweden, which it will restore and display. This would make the museum one of only four in the world to have a Halifax.

== Collection ==
=== Airplanes ===
Plane	Serial
Avro Lancaster	FM159
Avro Anson	7481
Avro Canada CF-100 Canuck	18152
Airspeed Oxford	
Beechcraft Model 18	CF-MPI
Bristol Bolingbroke	9987
Canadair CT-114 Tutor	114177
Canadair CT-133 Silver Star	21272
Cessna Crane	3760-60462
de Havilland Tiger Moth	1405
de Havilland Mosquito	RS700
Fairchild Cornell	42-71000
Fleet Fawn	123
Hispano Aviación HA-1112	n/a
North American Harvard	20419
North American Yale	64-2157
Vickers Viking (7/8-scale replica)	n/a
Westland Lysander (2/3-scale replica)	n/a

=== Vehicles ===
Vehicle	Type
1941 Dodge	fuel bowser
1941 Ford F-60	transport truck
1942 Ford	crash truck
1943 Ford	fire truck
1944 Jeep	utility

== Gallery ==
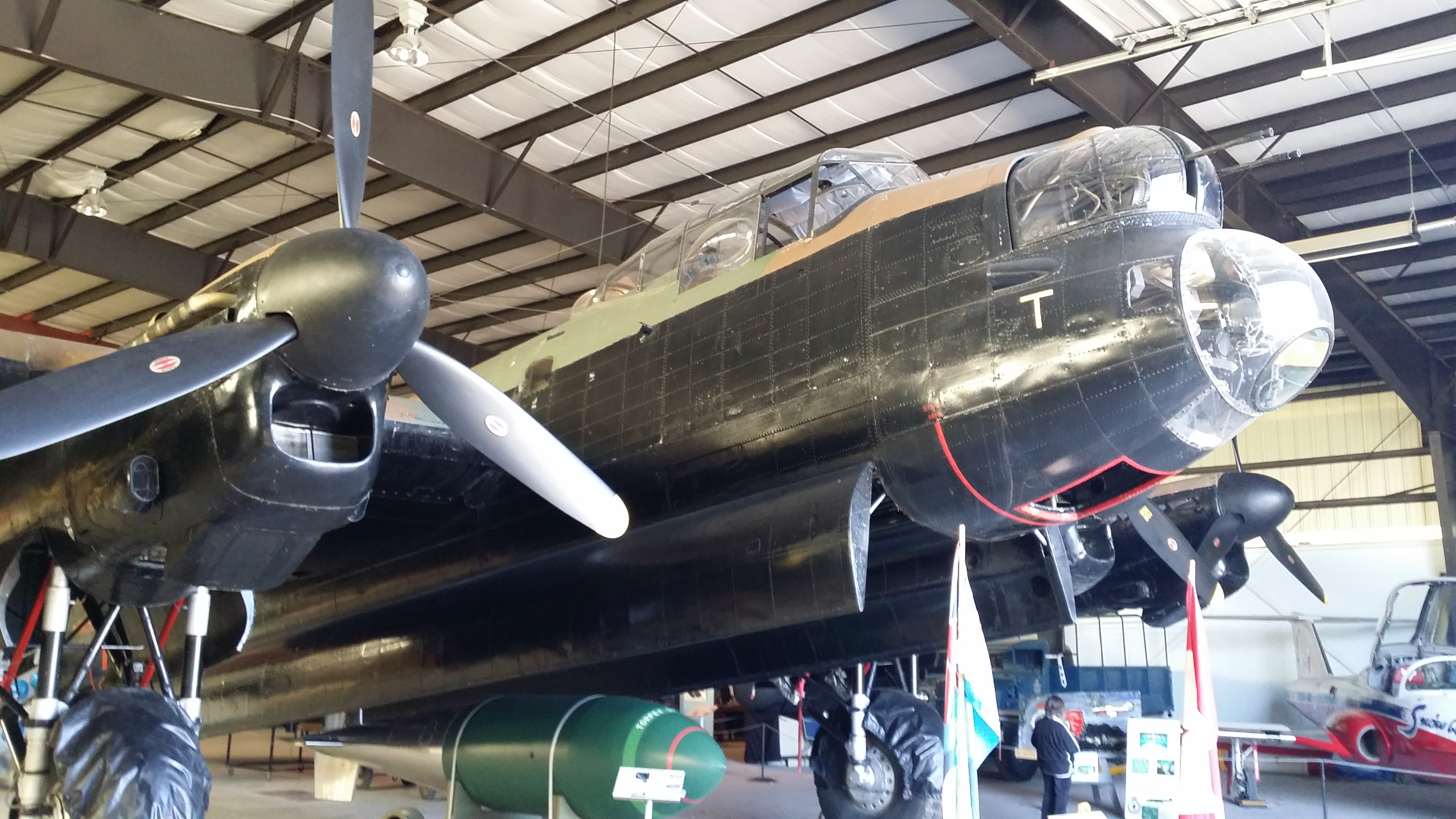

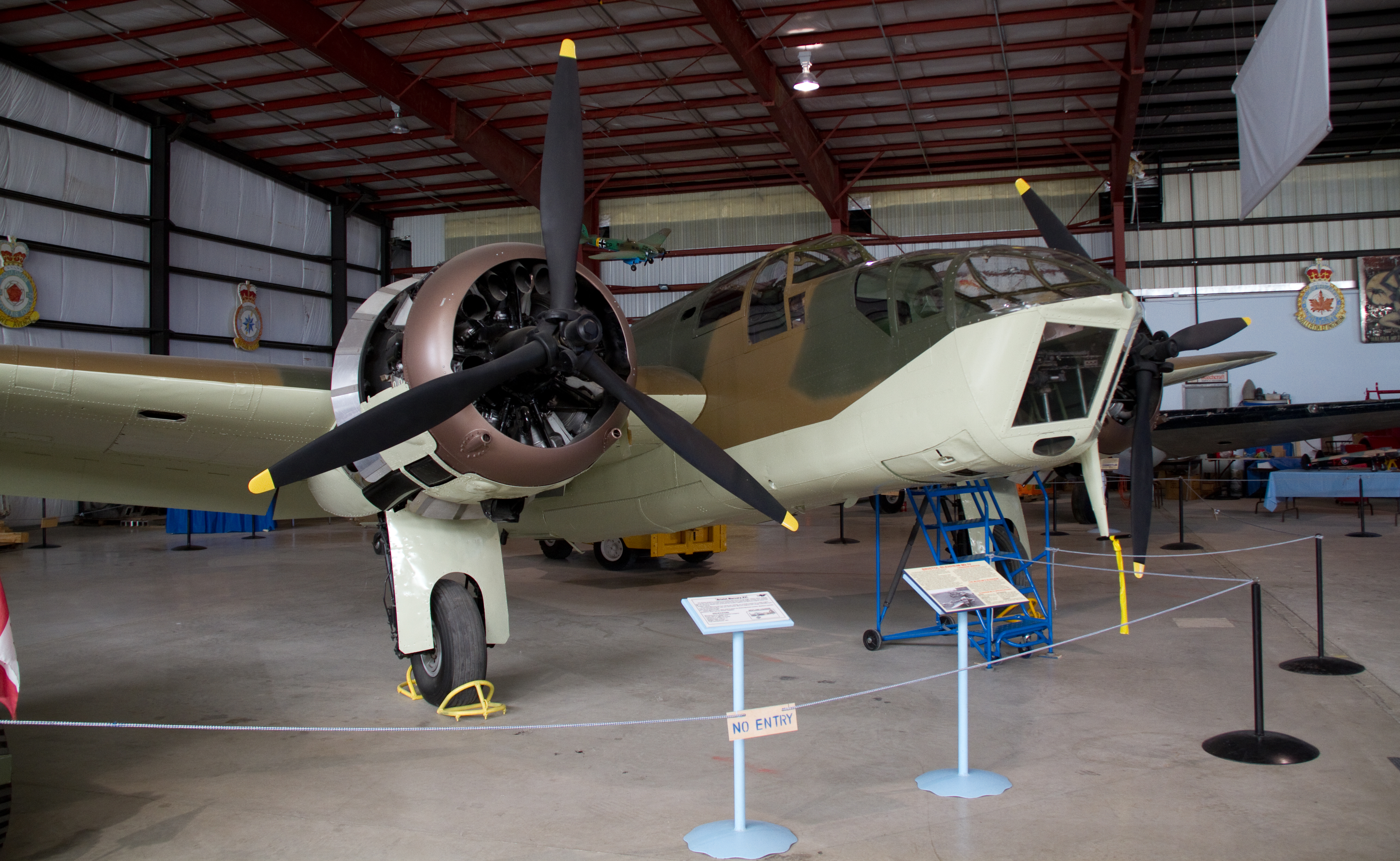

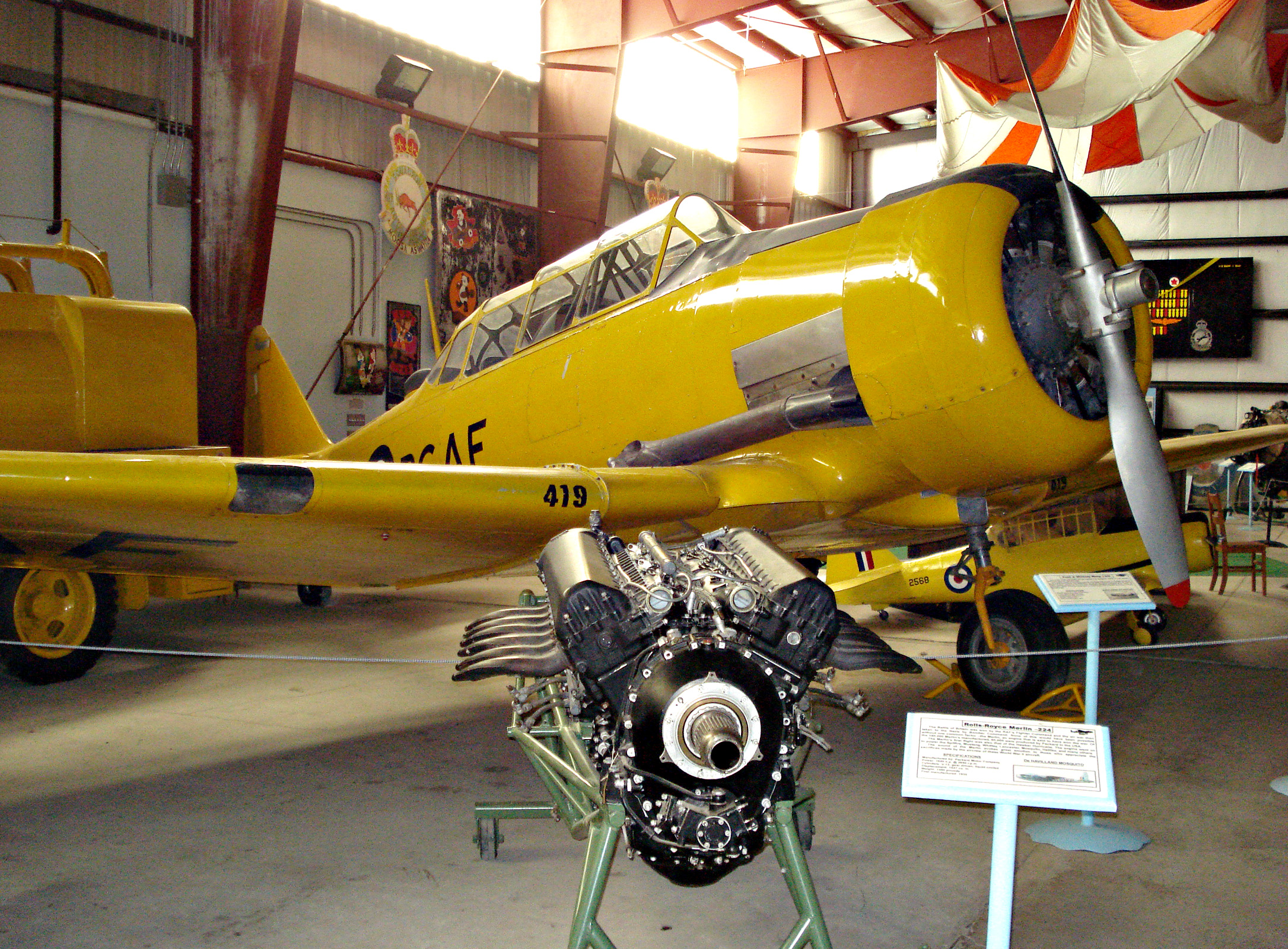

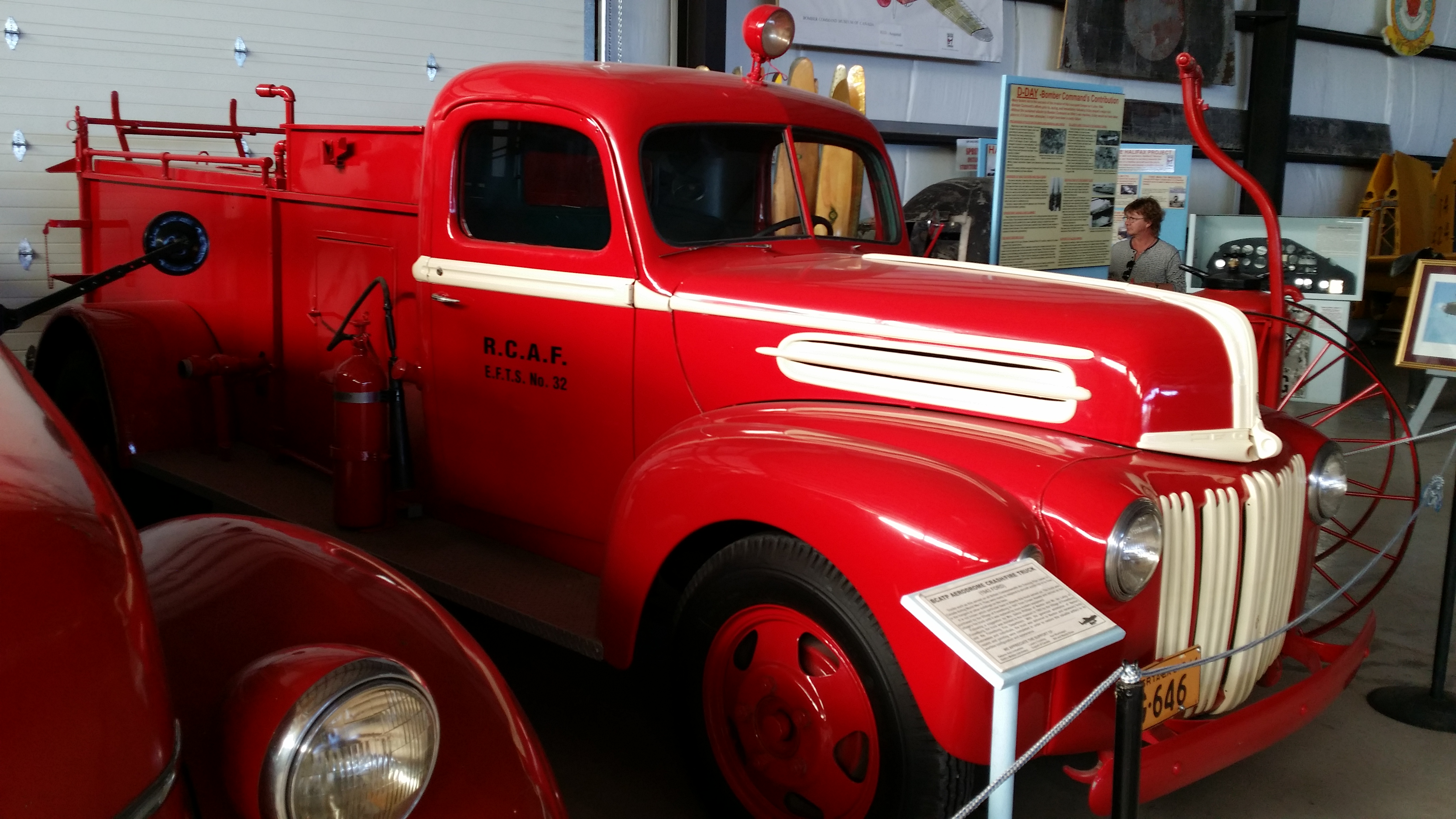

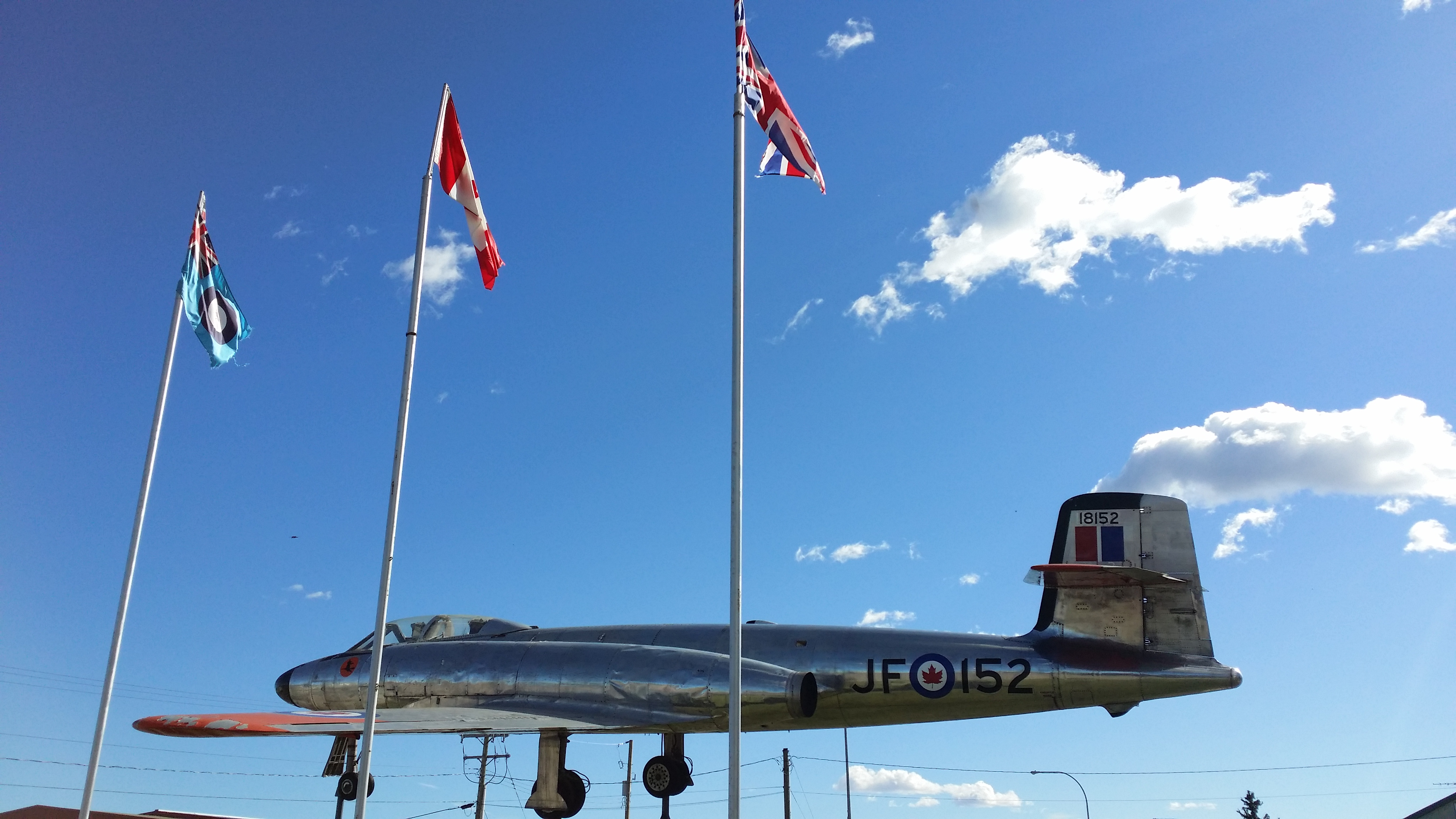

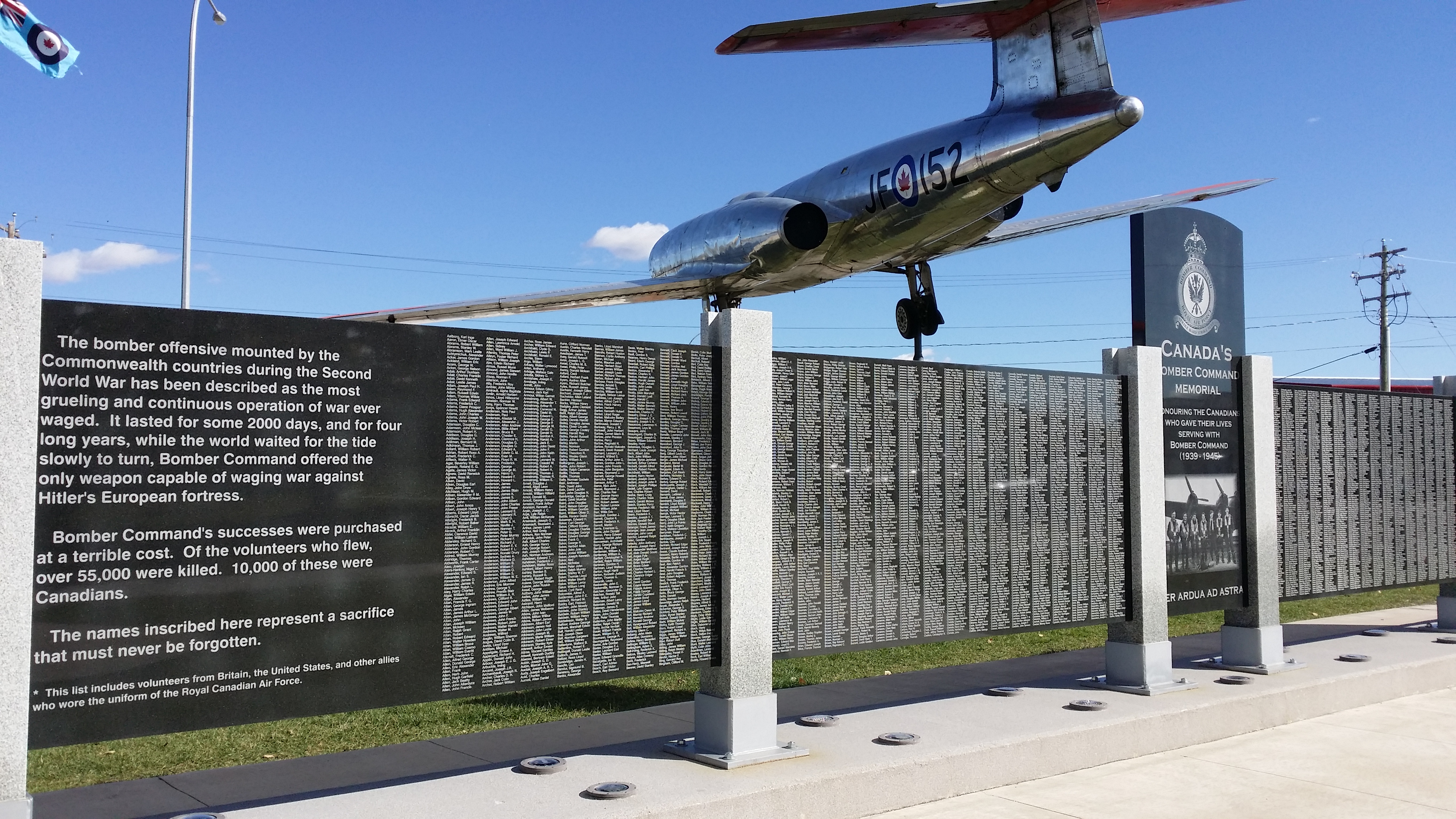

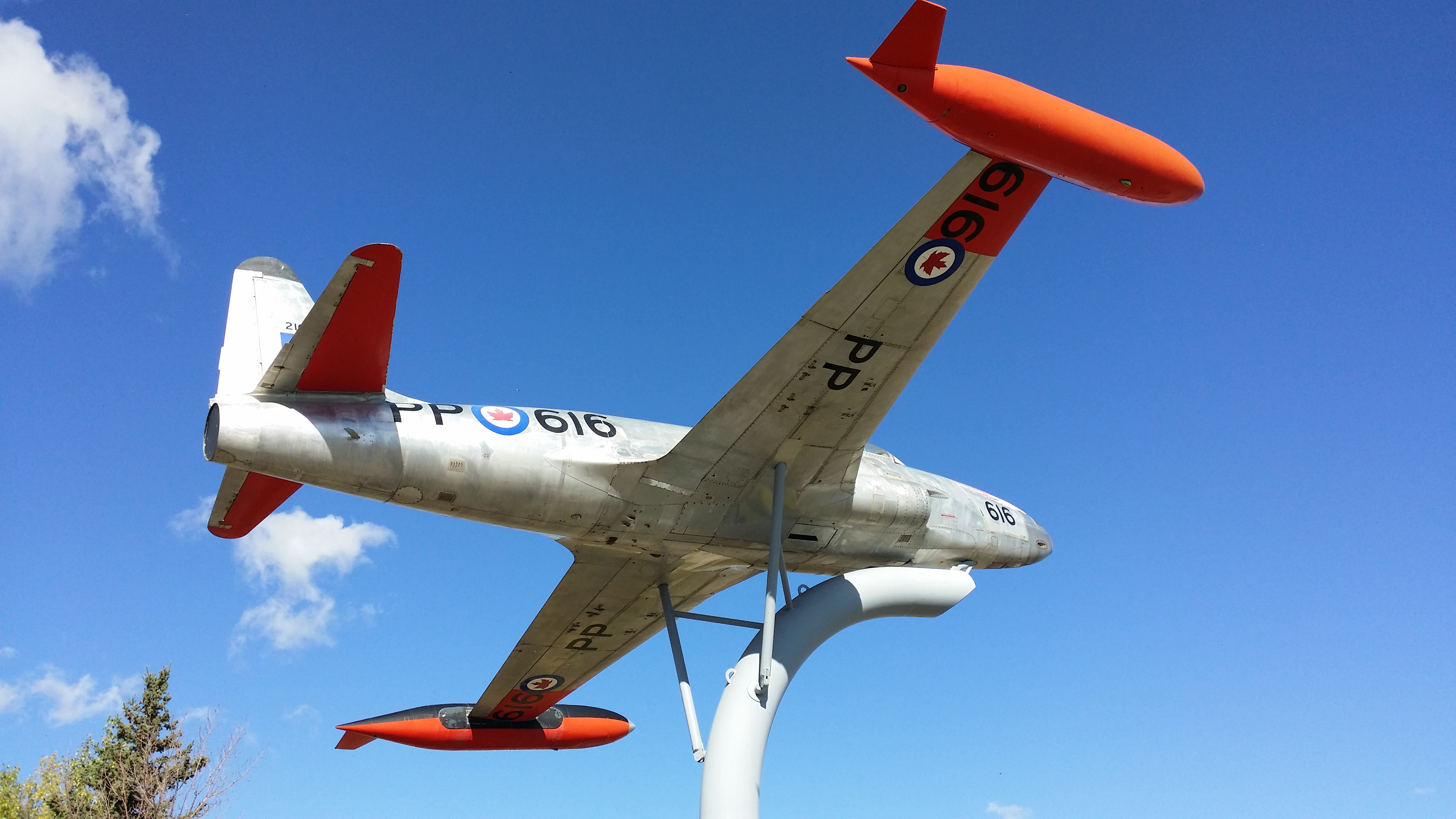

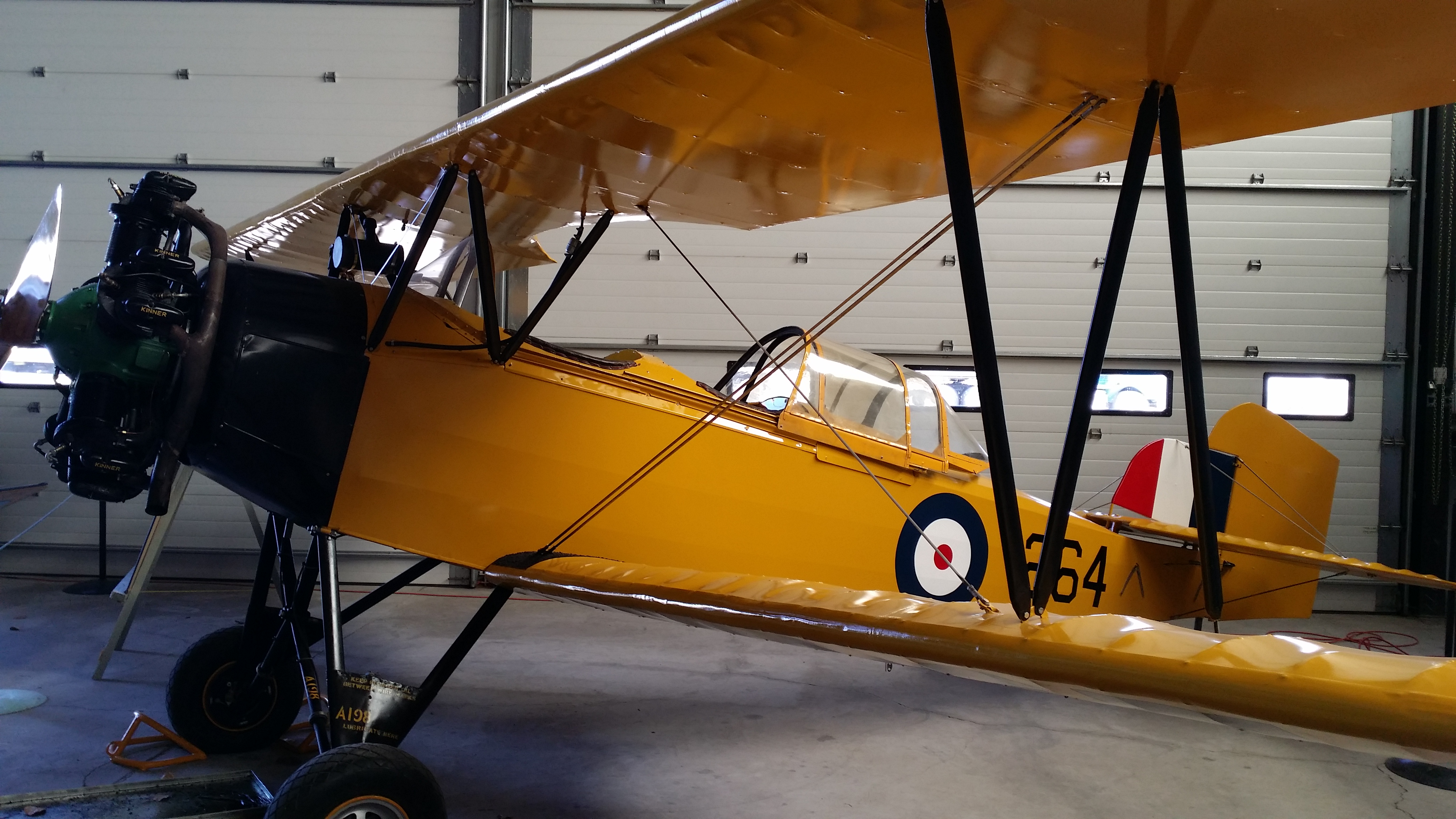

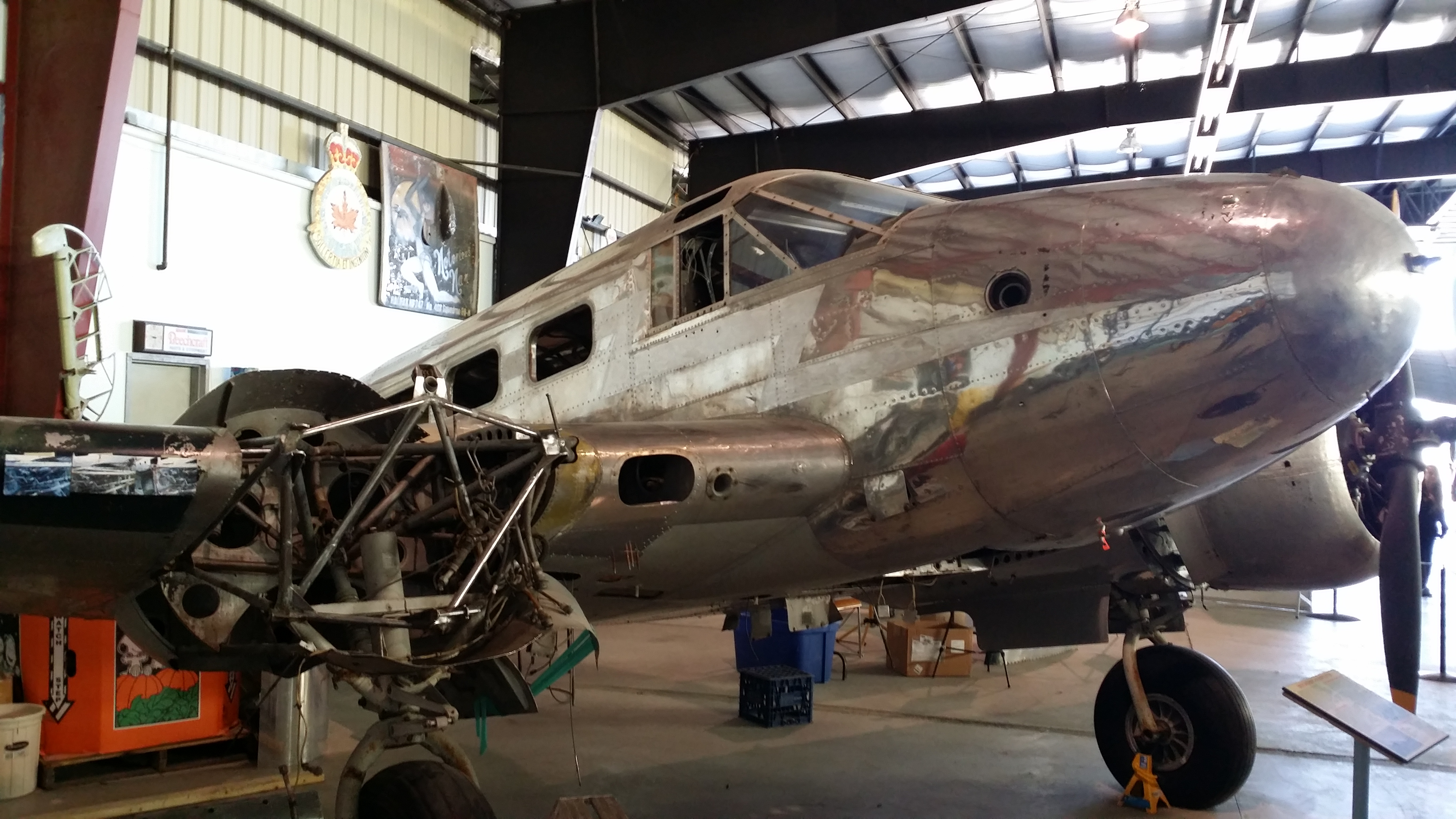

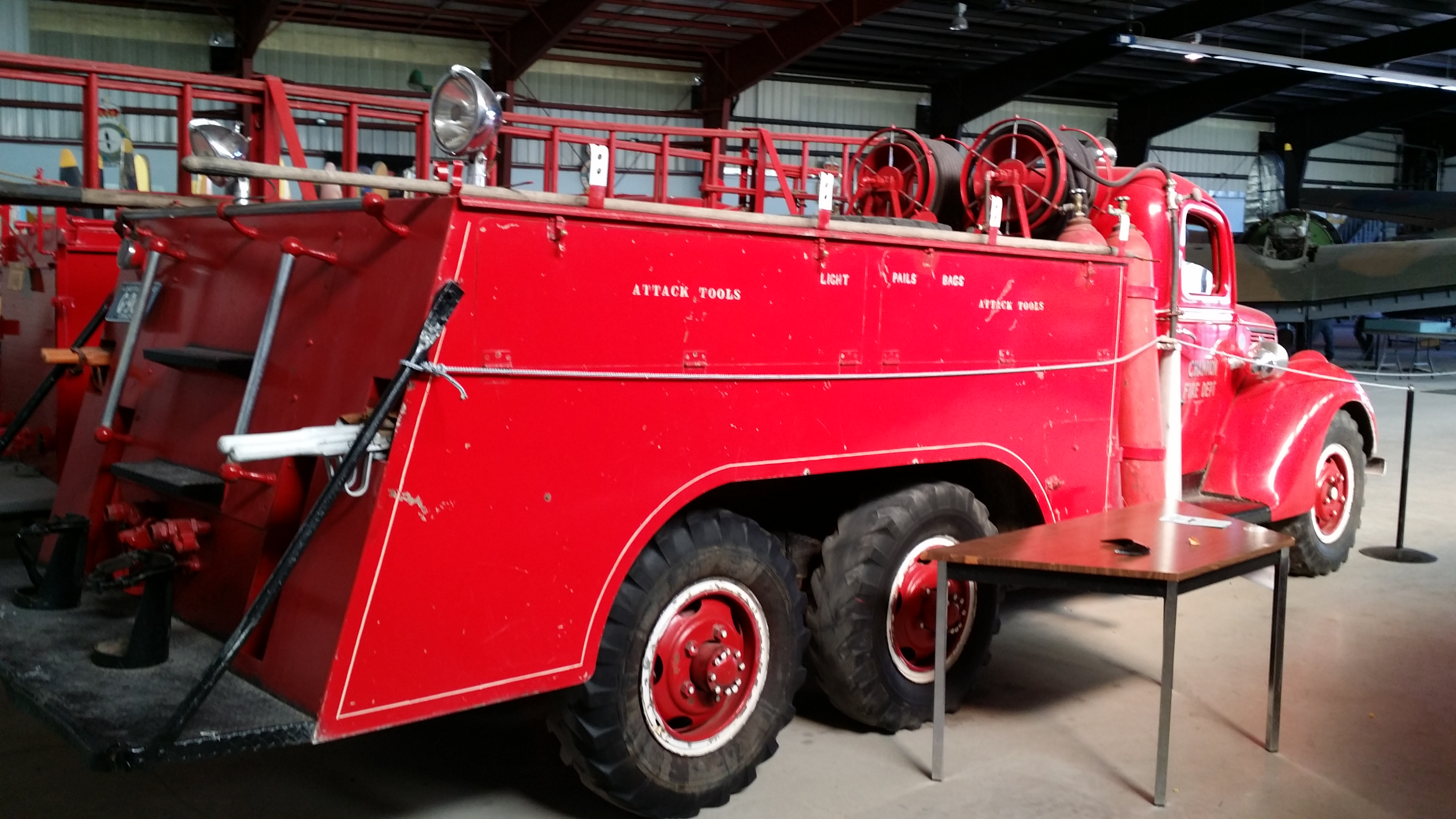
