= Silo Point Condominium =

Silo Point
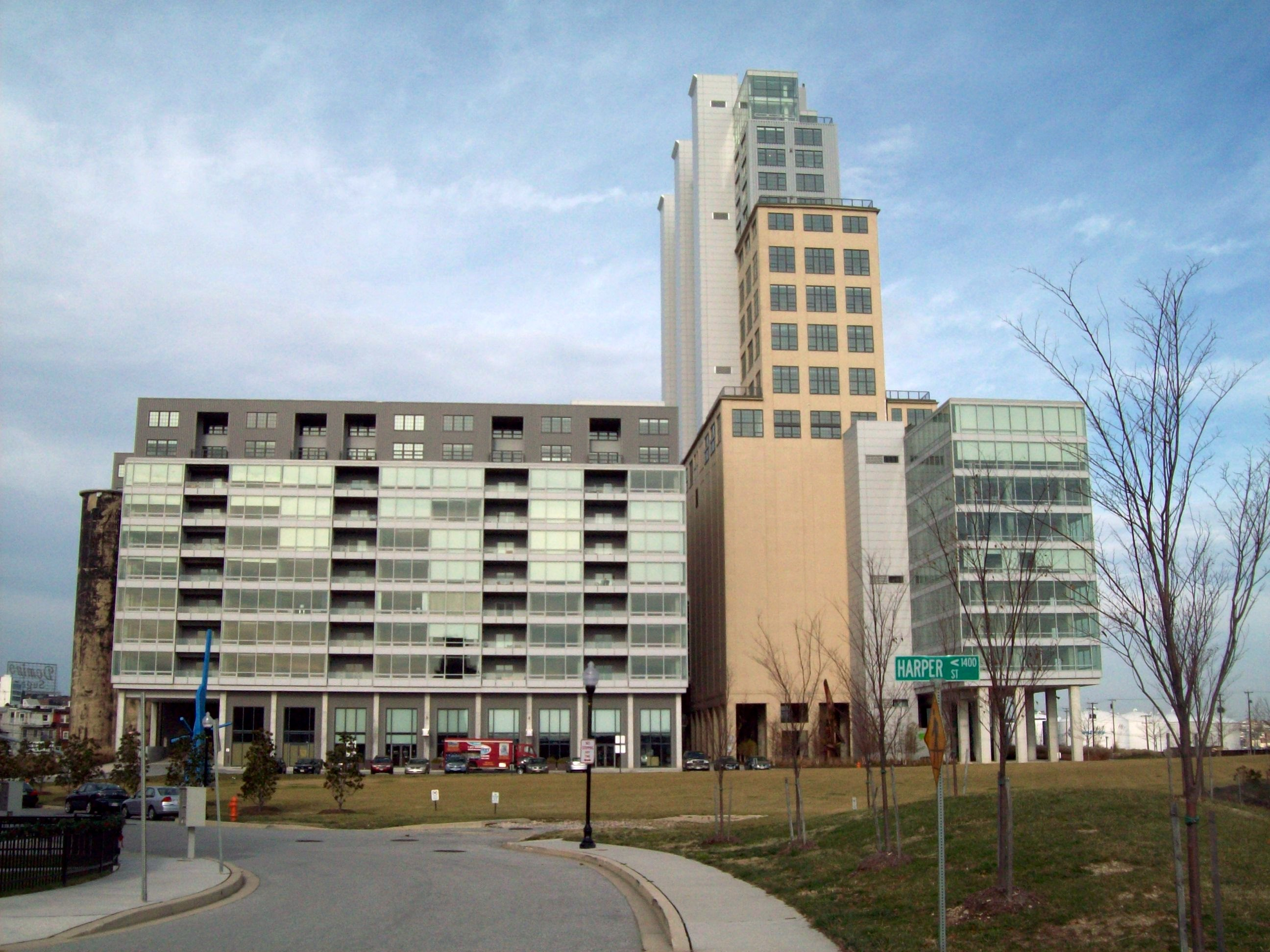
- View of the building from Harper St.
- Interactive map of the Silo Point area
- Former names: Baltimore and Ohio Locust Point Grain Terminal Elevator

General information
- Status: Completed
- Type: Residential condominiums
- Location: 1200 Steuart St; Baltimore, Maryland
- Coordinates: 39.27194°N 76.5889°W
- Completed: 2009

Height
- Roof: 94 m (308.4 ft)

Technical details
- Floor count: 24

Design and construction
- Developer: Turner Development Group
- Baltimore and Ohio Locust Point Grain Terminal Elevator
- U.S. National Register of Historic Places
- Location within Baltimore Location within Maryland Location within the United States
- Area: 7.5 acres (3.0 ha)
- Built: 1923
- Architect: Metcalf, John S.
- NRHP reference No.: 04001379
- Added to NRHP: December 23, 2004

Other information
- Number of units: 228

Silo Point, formerly known as the Baltimore and Ohio Locust Point Grain Terminal Elevator, is a residential complex converted from a high-rise grain elevator on the edge of the Locust Point neighborhood in Baltimore, Maryland. When the original grain elevator was completed in 1923, it was the largest and fastest in the world, rising to 308 feet (94 meters). Built by the Baltimore and Ohio Railroad in 1923–1924, with a capacity of 3.8 million bushels (134 thousand m^{3}). In 2009 it was converted from a grain elevator to a condominium 24 story tower with 228 condominium units by Turner Development Group and architect Parameter, Inc.

The grain elevator was listed on the National Register of Historic Places in 2004.

== Gallery ==
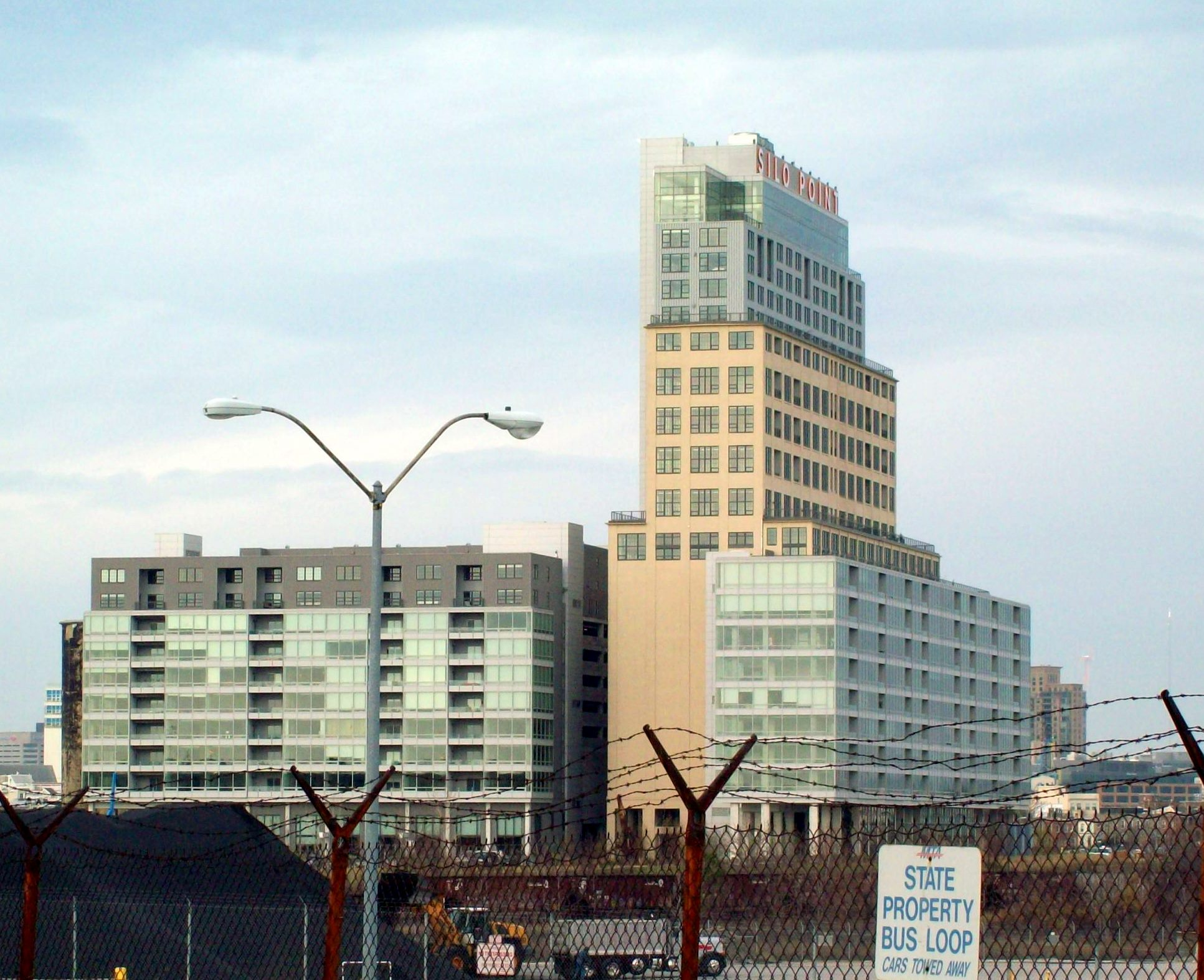
Silo Point viewed from East Fort Avenue at Fort McHenry, December 2011

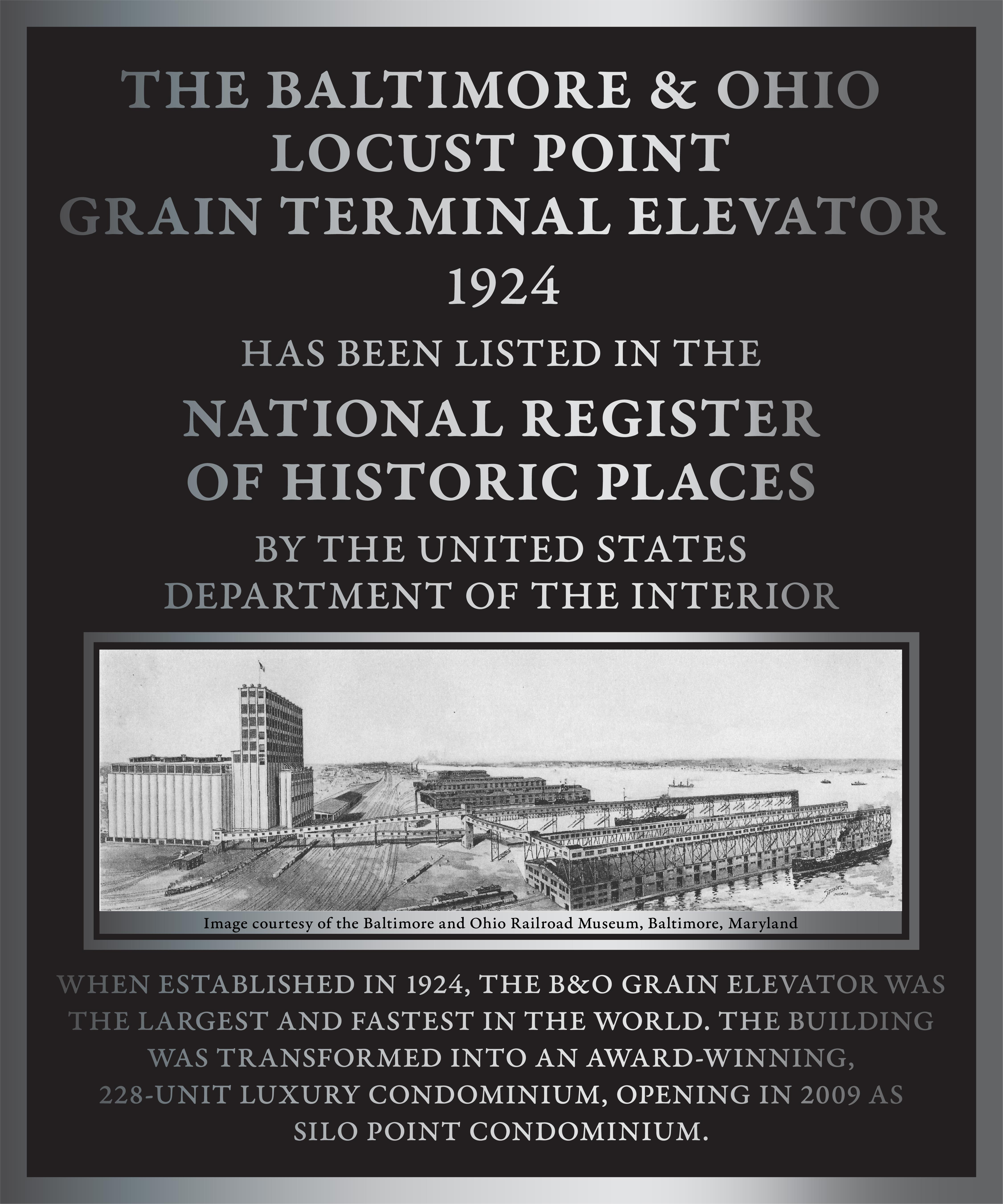
A plaque designating the Baltimore & Ohio Locust Point Grain Terminal Elevator was placed in the National Register of Historic Places in 2004 and was re-purposed as the Silo Point Condominium in 2009.

== See also ==
- List of tallest buildings in Baltimore
- List of grain elevators
- National Register of Historic Places listings in Maryland
