= Nanton, Alberta =

Nanton
- Town
- Town of Nanton
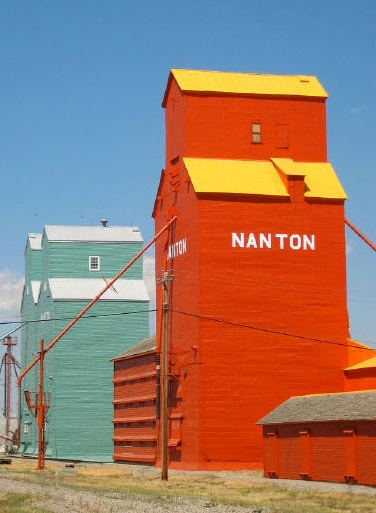
- Grain elevators
- Motto: Authentic Alberta
- Location within Alberta Location within Canada
- Coordinates: 50°20′58″N 113°46′18″W
- Country: Canada
- Province: Alberta
- Region: Southern Alberta
- Census division: 3
- Municipal district: Municipal District of Willow Creek No. 26
- Incorporated
  - Village: June 22, 1903
  - Town: August 9, 1907

Government
  - Mayor: Jennifer Handley
  - Governing body: Nanton Town Council

Area (2021)
  - Land: 5.11 km^{2} (1.97 sq mi)
- Elevation: 1,024 m (3,360 ft)

Population (2021)
  - Total: 2,167
  - Density: 423.9/km^{2} (1,098/sq mi)
- Time zone: UTC−06:00 (Alberta Time)
- Highways: Highway 2 Highway 533
- Website: Official website

Nanton is a town in southern Alberta, Canada. Nanton was named after Sir Augustus Meredith Nanton of Winnipeg (1860–1925) who directed firms which offered financing for farms and ranches throughout the west. It is located south of Calgary at the junction of Highway 2 and Highway 533.

Nanton was historically known as "Tap Town", after providing passing motorists with free water supplied from the foothills via a stand tap on the northbound highway. This water was one of the first to be bottled and sold in Canada, resulting in the creation of Nanton Water & Soda Ltd, still a thriving business in the town today.

Traditionally a farming and ranching community, Nanton is now a popular tourist destination.

== Demographics ==
In the 2021 Census of Population conducted by Statistics Canada, the Town of Nanton had a population of 2,167 living in 953 of its 1,004 total private dwellings, a change of −0.6% from its 2016 population of 2,181. With a land area of 5.11 km^{2} (1.97 sq mi), it had a population density of 424.1/km^{2} (1,098.3/sq mi) in 2021.

In the 2016 Census of Population conducted by Statistics Canada, the Town of Nanton originally recorded a population of 2,130 living in 922 of its 959 total private dwellings, a −0.1% change from its 2011 population of 2,132. Statistics Canada subsequently amended the 2016 census results for Nanton to a population of 2,181 living in 948 of its 987 total dwellings, a 2.3% change from its 2011 population of 2,132. With a land area of 4.87 km^{2} (1.88 sq mi), it had a population density of 447.8/km^{2} (1,159.9/sq mi) in 2016.

== Attractions ==
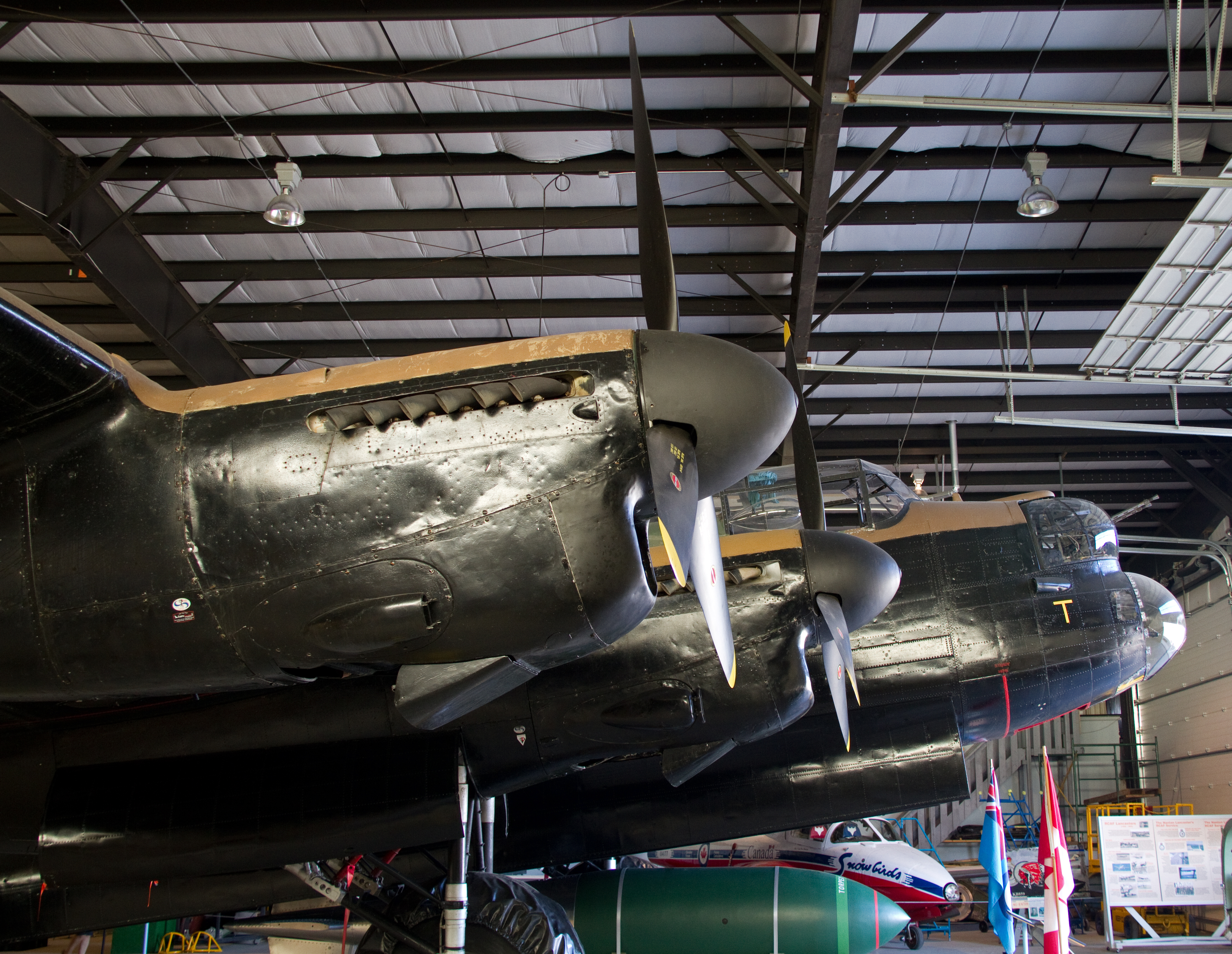
Avro Lancaster FM159 at Bomber Command Museum of Canada

Nanton is known primarily for three distinct features: an aviation museum - Bomber Command Museum of Canada (formerly known as the Nanton Lancaster Society Museum) situated in the centre of town on Highway 2 south, adjacent to Highway 533; a high number of antique shops; and two fully restored grain elevators on northbound Highway 2.

One of the main attractions at the aviation museum is its preserved Avro Lancaster bomber FM159 which performs regular runs of its Rolls-Royce Merlin engines. The aviation museum is also home to a number of other significant RAF Bomber Command era aircraft, including a Bristol Blenheim Mk IV.

Nanton's antique shops and galleries have contributed in making Nanton a popular tourist destination. They are organized around the notion of a downtown walk.

The Canadian Grain Elevator Discovery Centre is a set of restored grain elevators located in the centre of Nanton. The "Save One" society's goal is to preserve examples of old grain elevators to educate visitors about the town's, and Alberta's, agricultural history.

The Coutts Centre for Western Canadian Heritage was launched in June 2011, having been gifted from the late Dr. Jim Coutts (LLD '12) to the University of Lethbridge. Just east of Nanton, AB, the Coutts Centre consists of a quarter section of land on the more than 100-year-old property that once belonged to Dr. Coutts's grandfather. The quarter section of land includes the original homestead, extensive gardens and restored outbuildings. It preserves and celebrates the diverse heritage that is central to the spirit of the west.

== Arts and culture ==
Nanton's Agriculture park, home of Nanton Ag society, hosts a variety of events that includes Alberta High School Rodeos, TNT Roping and Barrel Racing, the Medicine Tree Ranch Rodeo, Nanton FCA Rodeo, Nanton Wrangler Youth Rodeo Series, as well is the venue for the long-standing tradition, the Nanton Nite Rodeo Series. In 2013 they played host to the Canadian High School Rodeo Finals.

Nanton was selected as one of fifty host communities for Alberta Culture Days 2014, to be held September from 26 to 28.

Nanton Round Up Days is a series of celebratory community events centered in the downtown core and typically held the first weekend in August. Celebrations culminate with a fireworks display.

Nanton Lights The Way and the Distinctly Nanton Market are festival events traditionally held in the last week of November, to mark the beginning of the Christmas season.

== Parks and recreation ==
Nanton has two parks, Centennial Park and Lions Park, both located alongside the southbound highway. Centennial Park has ball diamonds, a skate park and children's play area.

The Tom Hornecker Recreation Centre offers an outdoor heated pool, ice rink, curling sheets, gymnasium, and a racquetball court.

Nanton Golf club is an 18-hole course. A campground is adjacent to Nanton Golf Course and Agricultural Park. Facilities include a large, coin-operated shower building with washrooms, water taps throughout, camp kitchen, group camping and treed sites.

== Sports ==
The Nanton Palominos senior A hockey team have been in operation since 1947. They currently play in the Ranchland Hockey League. The Palominos earned a spot at the 2013 Investor's Group Hockey Alberta Senior Men's AA/A Provincial Championships in Innisfail, AB after winning the 2013 Ranchland Hockey League Championship. The team was led to victory by captain Steve "Smac" McMasters, winning the 2013 Senior A Championship.

== Education ==
The first school opened in 1902. There are two schools presently providing K-12 education in Nanton. A.B. Daley School houses grades K-6, while J.T. Foster provides grades 7–12. Each school has a population of approximately 200 students.

== Notable people ==
- Jim Coutts, lawyer, businessman and advisor to two prime ministers
- Glen Keeley, Canadian professional rodeo cowboy who specialized in bull riding
- Orest Kindrachuk, NHL player with the Philadelphia Flyers and Pittsburgh Penguins

== Images ==
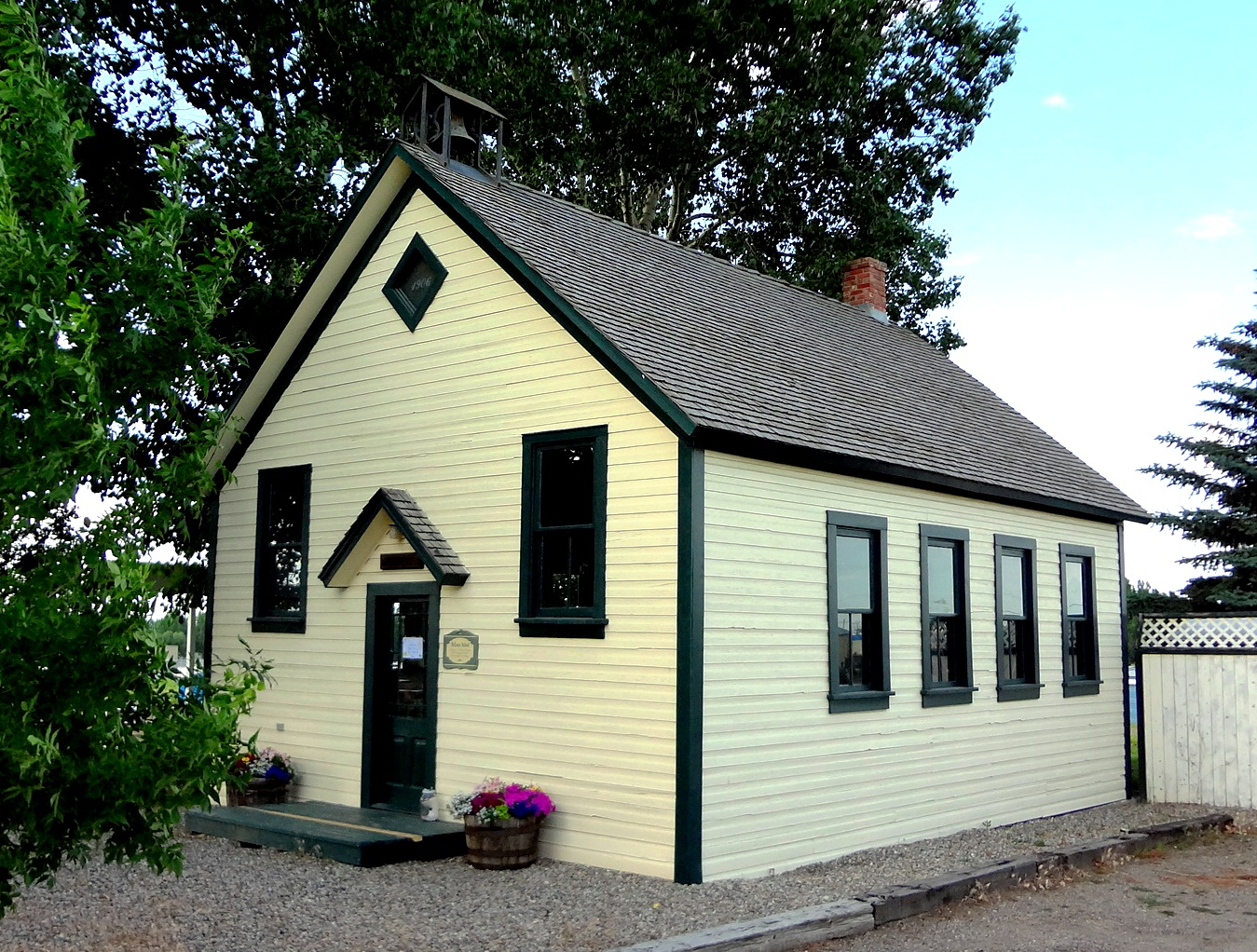
MacEwan Schoolhouse visitor information centre

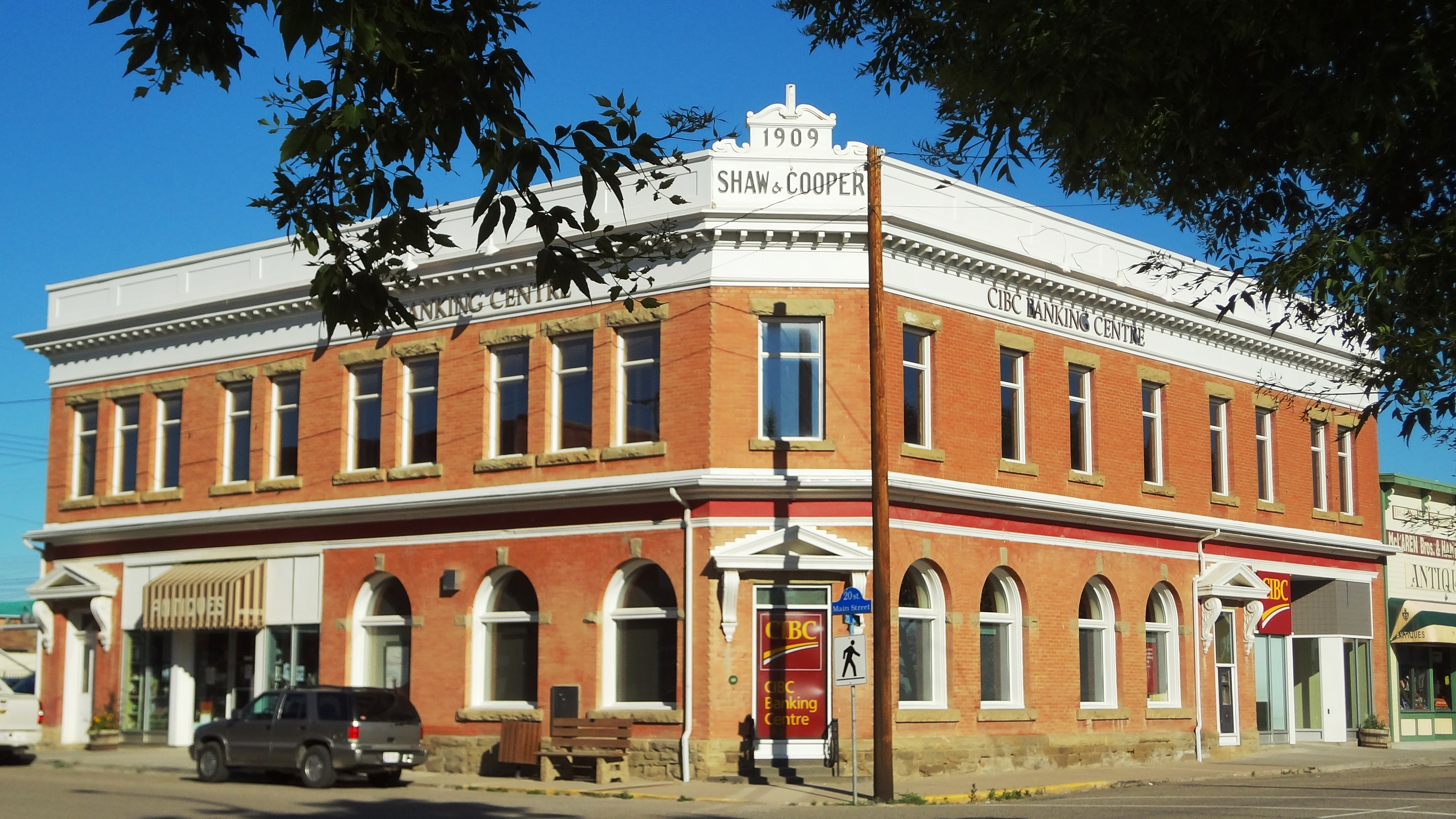
Shaw & Cooper Building

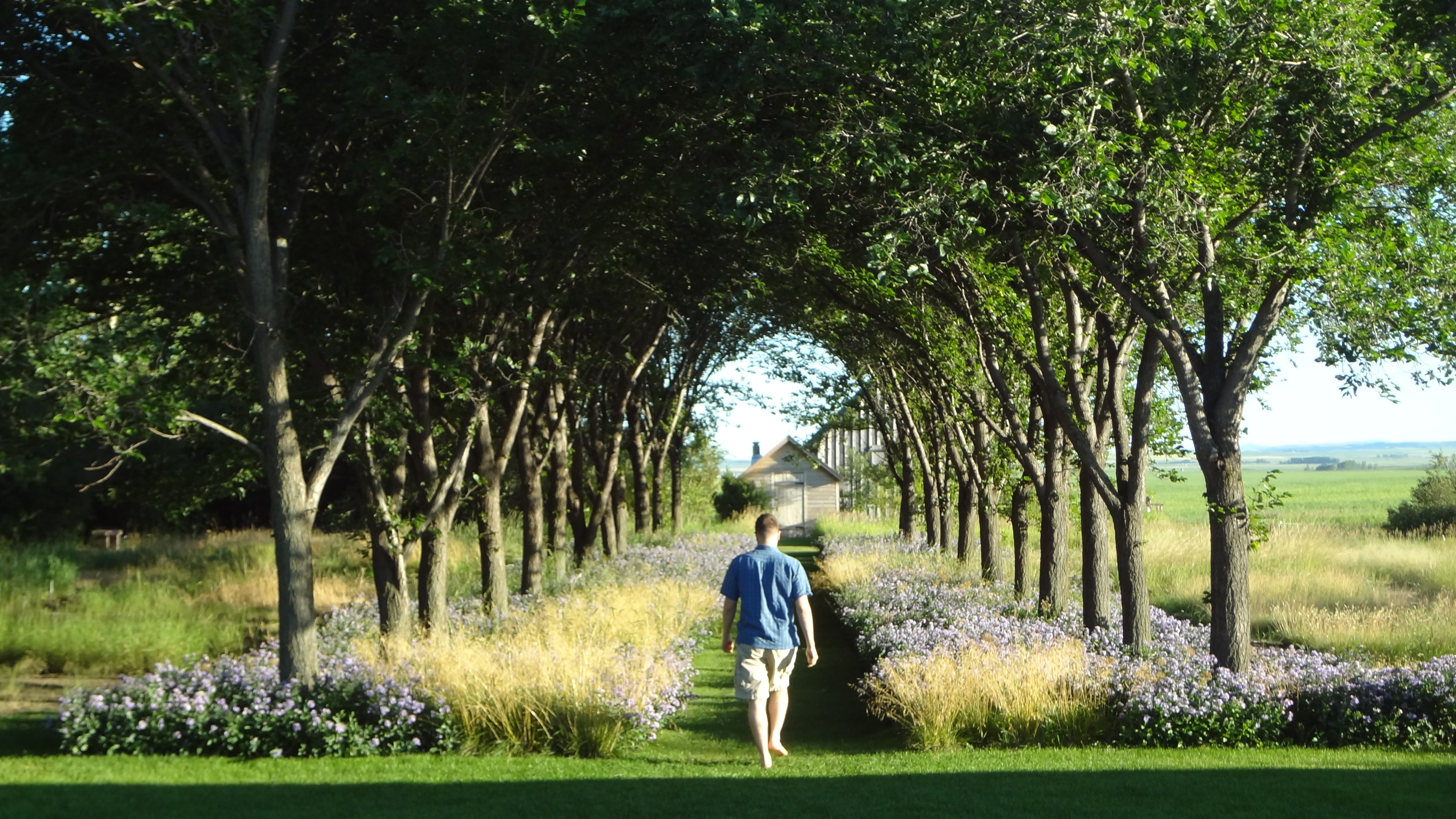
Tree lined path at the Coutts Centre

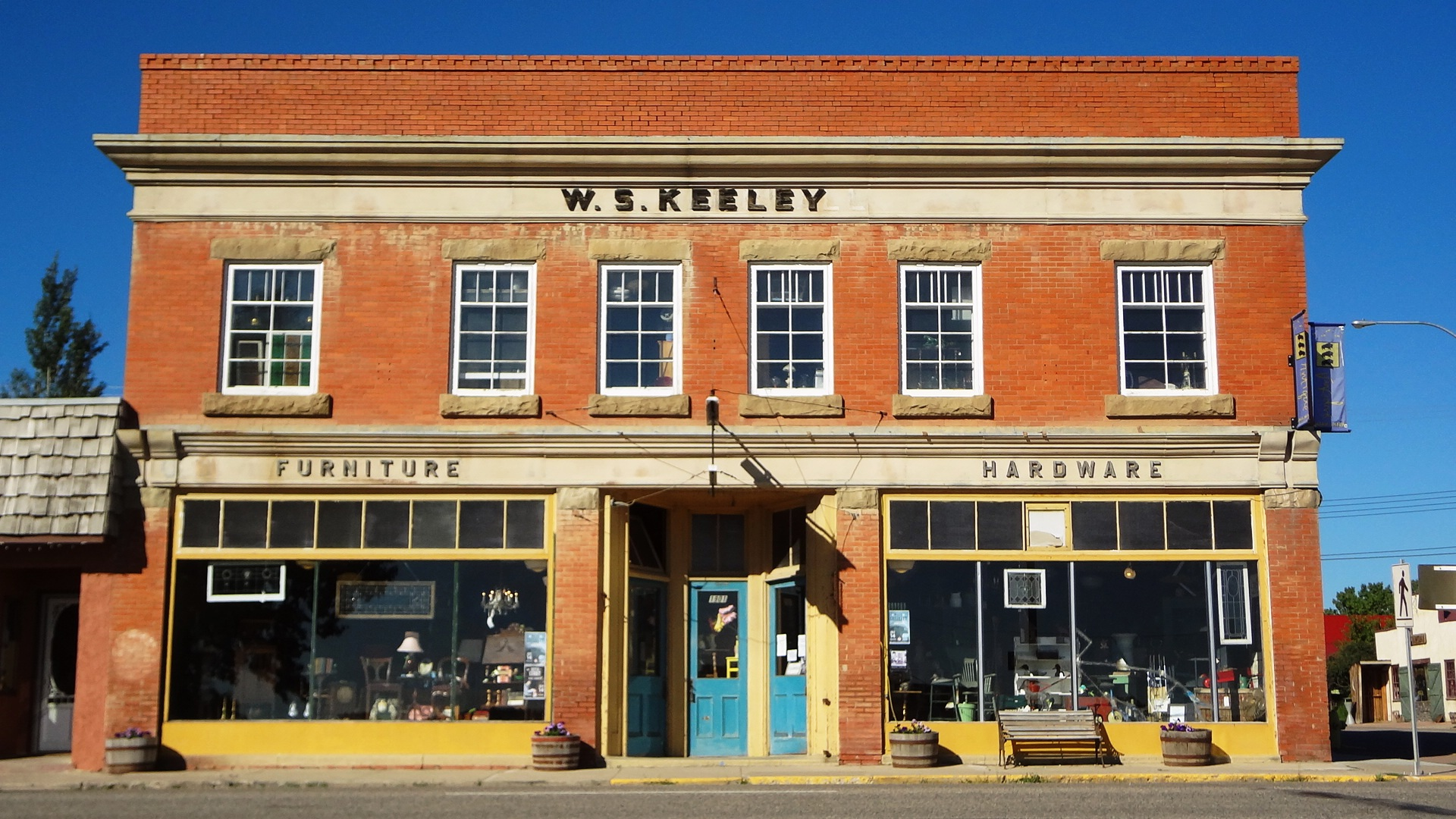
W.S. Keely Building

== See also ==
- List of communities in Alberta
- List of towns in Alberta
