= Wollenberg Grain and Seed Elevator =

- U.S. National Register of Historic Places
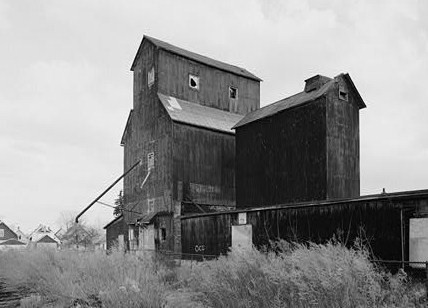
- Wollenberg Grain and Seed Elevator, ca. 1980

- Location within New York Location within the United States
- Location: 131 Goodyear Ave., Buffalo, New York
- Coordinates: 42°53′59″N 78°49′18″W
- Built: 1912
- Architect: Wannenwetsch, C.H.A. & Co.
- MPS: Buffalo Grain and Materials Elevator MPS
- NRHP reference No.: 03000409
- Added to NRHP: May 19, 2003

Wollenberg Grain and Seed Elevator was a historic grain and seed elevator located at Buffalo in Erie County, New York. It was built in 1912 and remained in service until 1987. It was notable as the sole surviving example of a wooden or so-called "country style" elevator. It was built in the style of the earliest elevators dating to the 1840s and had a capacity of 25,000 bushels.

It was destroyed by fire in October 2006.

It was listed on the National Register of Historic Places in 2003.

== See also ==
- List of grain elevators
