= Wollenberg (hill) =

Mountain in Germany

Coordinates: 50°52′36″N 08°40′03″E

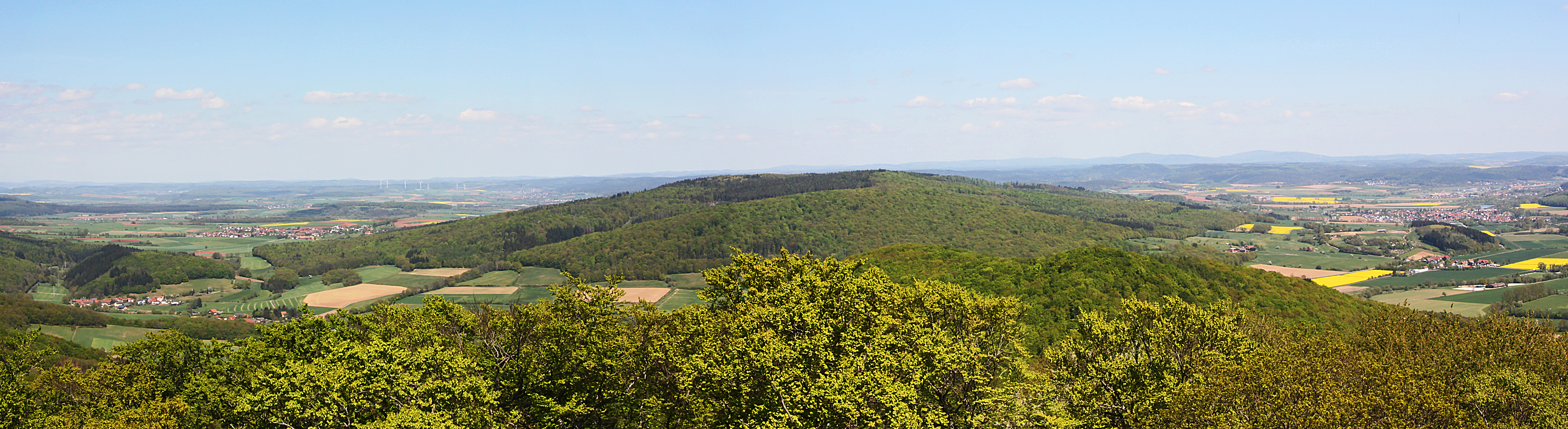
- View from the Rimberg tower (from the southwest) to Wollenberg.

Highest point
- Elevation: 474 m (1,555 ft)

Geography
- Location: Hesse, Germany

The Wollenberg is a hill in Hesse, Germany.
