= List of museums in Alberta =

This list of museums in Alberta, Canada contains museums which are defined for this context as institutions (including nonprofit organizations, government entities, and private businesses) that collect and care for objects of cultural, artistic, scientific, or historical interest and make their collections or related exhibits available for public viewing. Also included are non-profit art galleries and university art galleries. Museums that exist only in cyberspace (i.e., virtual museums) are not included.

== Museums ==
Name	Community	Region	Type	Summary
The Hangar Flight Museum	Calgary	Calgary	Aerospace	Military and civilian aircraft
Alberta Aviation Museum	Edmonton	Edmonton Metropolitan	Aerospace	Military and civilian aircraft
Alberta Birds of Prey Centre	Coaldale	Southern	Natural history	website, wildlife rehabilitation facility with nature and birds of prey exhibits, aviaries
Alberta Central Railway Museum	Wetaskiwin	Central	Railway	Historic railroad cars and equipment, also grain elevator
Alberta Legislature Building	Edmonton	Edmonton Metropolitan	History	Interpretive centre exhibits about the region's history, the legislature and the building, a restored building which houses exhibits on prohibition and the famous Cpl Lawson murder by Picariello and Lossandro.
Alberta Provincial Police Barracks	Coleman	Crowsnest Pass	Prohibition	website, restored barracks building with exhibits on Alberta prohibition and the murder of Cpl Lawson by Picariello and Lossandro
Alberta Sports Hall of Fame	Red Deer	Central	Sport	History of professional and amateur sport in Alberta
Alberta Railway Museum	Edmonton	Edmonton Metropolitan	Railway	Railway equipment and buildings
Alix Wagon Wheel Regional Museum	Alix	Central	History	information, local history
Alumni Corner Museum	Olds, Alberta	Central Alberta	History	Display of memorabilia, artifacts and photos relating to Olds College History WEBSITE
Anthony Henday Museum	Delburne	Central	History	information, information, local history, mining, agriculture, and household items, housed within an old CNR railway station
Art Gallery of Alberta	Edmonton	Edmonton Metropolitan	Art	
Atlas Coal Mine	East Coulee	Southern	Mining	
Banff Park Museum National Historic Site	Banff	Rockies	Natural history	Located in Banff National Park, animals and plants of the park
Barrhead Centennial Museum	Barrhead	Central	History	information, local history
Bar U Ranch National Historic Site	Longview	Southern	Open-air	Historic ranch with 35 buildings and structures illustrating various stages of ranching development
Basilian Fathers Museum	Mundare	Central	Ethnic	website, Ukrainian cultural and religious heritage
Battle River Pioneer Museum	Manning	Northern	History	information, local history
Bearberry Heritage & Arts Centre	Bearberry	Central	Multiple	website, local history and art
Beiseker Station Museum	Beiseker	Calgary	History	website, local history
Bellevue Underground Mine	Bellevue	Rockies	Mining	website, underground coal mine tour
Bentley Museum	Bentley	Central	History	information, local history
Big Valley Creation Science Museum	Big Valley	Central	Creationist	
Big Valley Museum	Big Valley	Central	History	information, local history, railway memorabilia, antique vehicles and machinery
Blackfoot Crossing Historical Park	Siksika	Southern	First Nations	website
Bomber Command Museum of Canada	Nanton	Southern	Aerospace	website
Bonnyville & District Museum	Bonnyville	Central	History	website, local history, includes two churches, a replica schoolhouse, 1920s store, a hospital display, a representation of a North West trading post, awater tower, and a 1907-period house that typifies pioneer life
Bowden Pioneer Museum	Bowden	Central	History	website, local history, period room and business displays, photography equipment, Avon Products memorabilia, household items, clothing and more
Breton and District Historical Museum	Breton	Central	History	information, local history
Brooks & District Museum	Brooks	Southern	Open-air	, information, includes 17 buildings
Bud Barn	Didsbury	Central	Commodity	website, over 20,000 Anheuser-Busch products, collectibles and memorabilia
Buffalo Nations Luxton Museum	Banff	Rockies	First Nations	website
Calgary & Edmonton Railway Museum	Edmonton	Edmonton Metropolitan	Railway	Open seasonally
Camrose and District Centennial Museum	Camrose	Central	Open-air	website, includes local history museum, fire hall, newspaper, machine building, blacksmith shop, school, church, pioneer home and more
Camrose Railway Station & Park	Camrose	Central	Railway	information, information
Canada's Sports Hall of Fame	Calgary	Calgary	Sport	National sports hall of fame and museum of sports in Canada
Canadian Grain Elevator Discovery Center	Nanton	Southern	Agriculture	Historic grain elevator
Canadian Historic Windpower Museum	Etzikom	Southern	History	historic windmills, pioneer history
Canadian Tractor Museum	Westlock	Central	Agriculture	website, antique tractors and steam engines
Canmore Museum and Geoscience Centre	Canmore	Rockies	Multiple	Local history, coal mining
Card Pioneer Home	Cardston	Southern	Historic house	information, late 19th-century log home
Carstairs Heritage Centre	Carstairs	Calgary	History	information, local history
Castor and District Museum	Castor	Central	History	information, information, local history
Chauvin and District Museum	Chauvin	Central Eastern	History	information, online gallery (coming), local history and archives
Chinese Cultural Centre	Calgary	Calgary	Ethnic	Chinese Canadian history and Chinese culture
Claresholm and District Museum	Claresholm	Southern	History	website, local history
Climb Thru Time Museum	Paradise Valley	Central	History	information, local history, housed in a grain elevator
Cold Lake Air Force Museum	Cold Lake	Central	Aerospace	
Cold Lake Museums	Cold Lake	Central	Multiple	Oil and gas industry, local history, aboriginal history and culture
Courthouse Museum	Cardston	Southern	History	information
Creative Kids Museum	Calgary	Calgary	Children's	Part of the Telus Spark, hands-on explorations of music, theater and visual arts
Crowsnest Museum	Coleman	Rockies	History	website, pioneer and coal-mining life, period store and business displays. Extensive photo archive. Also maintains the Alberta Provincial Police Barracks
Danish Canadian National Museum & Gardens	Dickson	Central	Ethnic	website, culture and history of the Danes in Canada
DeBolt and District Pioneer Museum	Debolt	Northern	Open-air	information, information
Devil's Coulee Dinosaur Heritage Museum	Warner	Southern	Natural history	
Dewberry Valley Museum	Dewberry	Central	History	website, local history
Dickson Store Museum	Dickson	Central	History	website, 1930s period general store, post office and home
Didsbury Museum	Didsbury	Central	History	information, local history, period room and business displays
Dinosaur Provincial Park	Brooks	Southern	Natural history	Visitor center displays about dinosaurs and fossils
Diplomat Mine Museum	Forestburg	Central	Mining	information, surface coal mining, Marion 360 stripping shovel
Donalda and District Museum	Donalda	Central	History	website, local history, pioneer and household antiques, buildings
Double Tree Village Museum	Spruce View	Central	Open-air	website
Dr. Woods House Museum	Leduc	Edmonton Metropolitan	Historic house	website, information, 1930s period house and doctor's office
East Coulee School Museum	East Coulee	Southern	History	website, 1930s life in a coal mining town
Echo Dale Farm	Medicine Hat	Southern	Open-air	website, includes historic farm, antiques, equipment, 1900-1910 era farmhouse, replica 1930's blacksmith shop, coal mine
Edmonton Public Schools Archives and Museum	Edmonton	Edmonton Metropolitan	Education	History of education and politics in Edmonton, includes an 1881 schoolhouse, 1950s period classroom and a 1906 legislative assembly room
Edmonton Radial Railway Society	Edmonton	Edmonton Metropolitan	Railway	Electric street cars
End of Steel Museum	Hines Creek	Northern	History	information, local history
Esplanade Arts and Heritage Centre	Medicine Hat	Southern	Multiple	website, includes local history museum, changing exhibits, art gallery, theater
Fairview Pioneer Museum	Fairview	Northern	Open-air	information
Fairview R.C.M.P. Centennial Museum	Fairview	Northern	Military	information, former barracks, residence and prison cell
Father Lacombe Chapel	St. Albert	Edmonton Metropolitan	History	website, 1861 log chapek, oldest building in Western Canada
Firefighters Museum of Calgary	Calgary	Calgary	Firefighting	website, currently seeking new location, history of firefighting in the city
Forestburg and District Museum	Forestburg	Central	History	information, local history
Fort Assiniboine Museum	Fort Assiniboine	Northern	History	information, 19th-century fur trading history
Fort Calgary	Calgary	Calgary	Open-air	
Fort Chipewyan Bicentennial Museum	Fort Chipewyan	Northern	History	information, local history
Fort Edmonton Park	Edmonton	Edmonton Metropolitan	Living	Four periods represented: 1846 fur trade fort, 1885 settlement period, 1905 municipal period, 1920 city life
Fort George & Buckingham House Provincial Historic Site	Elk Point	Central	History	website, history of two competing fur trade posts
Fort McMurray Heritage Park	Fort McMurray	Northern	Open-air	website, includes seventeen historic buildings, two railway cars, a collection of large artifacts
Fort Museum of the North-West Mounted Police	Fort Macleod	Southern	Law enforcement	website, history of the North-West Mounted Police
Fort Normandeau	Red Deer	Central	Open-air	Recreated late 19th-century pioneer fort with living history enactors
Fort Ostell Museum	Ponoka	Central	History	website, local history
Fort Saskatchewan Museum and Historic Site	Fort Saskatchewan	Edmonton Metropolitan	Open-air	website
Fort Vermilion Heritage Centre	Fort Vermilion	Northern	History	information, local history
Fort Whoop-Up National Historic Site	Lethbridge	Southern	Open-air	Recreated late 19th-century whiskey trade fort and museum
Fossil World Discovery Center	Drumheller	Southern	Natural history	website
Fox Creek Museum	Fox Creek	Northern	History	information, local history
Frank Slide Interpretive Centre	Frank	Rockies	History	website, information, local history, history of the Frank Slide, Canadian Pacific Railway, European settlement, early underground coal mining and community life
Galloway Station Museum	Edson	Central	Railway	information, also area coal mining and lumber industry exhibits
Galt Historic Railway Park	County of Warner No. 5	Southern	Railway	1890 International Train Depot and railway exhibits
Galt Museum & Archives	Lethbridge	Southern	History	Southern Alberta area history
Gem of the West Museum	Coaldale	Southern	History	website, local history
Gibbons Museum	Gibbons	Edmonton Metropolitan	History	information, information
Glenbow Museum	Calgary	Calgary	Multiple	Art, history, natural history, ethnography, Asian artifacts
Gopher Hole Museum	Torrington	Southern	Commodity	Features stuffed ground squirrels in town settings dioramas
Grande Prairie Museum	Grande Prairie	Northern	Multiple	website, local history, also open-air Heritage Village
Grouard Historical Village	Grouard	Northern	Open-air	information
Hanna Museum and Pioneer Village	Hanna	Southern	Open-air	website
Head-Smashed-In Buffalo Jump	Fort Macleod	Southern	First Nations	Blackfoot culture and history
Heritage Acres Farm Museum	Pincher Creek	Southern	Open-air	Includes vintage farm machinery, equipment, tools, historic farm and village buildings, grain elevator, sawmill
Heritage Discovery Centre	Grande Prairie	Northern	Multiple	website, natural and local history
Heritage Park Historical Village	Calgary	Calgary	Living	Turn-of-the-century village, including transportation, and the Gasoline Alley Museum with automobiles, oil and gas related artifacts
High Prairie & District Museum	High Prairie	Northern	History	information, local history
Historic Dunvegan	Dunvegan	Northern	Open-air	website, 19th-century fur trade post and missionary centre
Holden Historical Society Museum	Holden	Central	History	website, local history
Homestead Pioneer Museum	Drumheller	Southern	History	information, over 10,000 antiques and artifacts from the Victorian and Edwardian eras
Innisfail Historical Village	Innisfail	Central	Open-air	website, includes 17 buildings on 2 acres (8,100 m^{2})
Innisfree Prairie Bank of Commerce Museum	Innisfree	Central	History	website, local history
Irma Museum	Irma	Central	History	website, local history
Iron Creek Museum	Lougheed	Central	History	website, local history
Jasper-Yellowhead Museum	Jasper	Rockies	History	website, local history
John Walter Museum	Edmonton	Edmonton Metropolitan	Historic house	website, 19th-century pioneer home in Kinsmen Park
Kingman Regional School Museum and Tea House	Kingman	Central	History	information
Kinosayo Museum	Kinuso	Northern	History	information, local history
Kneehill Historical Museum	Three Hills	Central	History	information, information, local history
Kootenai Brown Pioneer Village	Pincher Creek	Southern	Open-air	website, includes 22 heritage buildings and two museum buildings
La Crete Mennonite Heritage Village	La Crete	Northern	Open-air	website, 1853 mission
Lac Cardinal Pioneer Village Museum	Grimshaw	Northern	Open-air	Represents life in the 1920s and 1940s
Lac La Biche Mission	Lac La Biche	Northern	History	1853 mission with church and visitors center
Lac Ste. Anne Pioneer Museum	Lac Ste. Anne	Central	History	information, local history
Leduc #1 Energy Discovery Centre	Devon	Edmonton Metropolitan	Industry	Petroleum industry, equipment and the Leduc No. 1 discovery
Leighton Art Centre	Millarville	Calgary	Art	website, 1950s home of artists A.C. and Barbara Leighton, gallery of Alberta art
Lethbridge Military Museum	Lethbridge	Southern	Military	website, military history of Lethbridge and area from 1899 to present
Lloydminster Cultural & Science Centre	Lloydminster	Central	Multiple	website, public art gallery, wildlife display, heavy oil science centre
Lougheed House	Calgary	Calgary	Historic house	Late 19th-century Victorian mansion
Loyal Edmonton Regiment Military Museum	Edmonton	Edmonton Metropolitan	Military	Includes weapons, uniforms, medals, photos and other artifacts of the regiment's history
Mackenzie Crossroads Museum	High Level	Northern	History	information, information, regional history, trading post display
Mallaig & District Museum	Mallaig	Central	History	information, includes 1920 replica log schoolhouse, 1931 church, agricultural equipment and machinery
Mannville Historical Telephone Exchange	Mannville	Central	History	information, local history
Markerville Creamery Museum	Markerville	Central	Agriculture	website, creamery operations
Masonic Hall Museum	Edmonton	Edmonton Metropolitan	History	On "1905 St" in Fort Edmonton Park53.501433°N 113.580688°W
Medicine Hat Clay Industries National Historic District	Medicine Hat	Southern	Multiple	website, former Medalta Potteries and Hycroft China Factory complexes, pottery gallery, workshops, ceramics and pottery items
Métis Crossing	Smoky Lake	Central	First Nations	website, Métis people (Canada) cultural center
Michelsen Farmstead	Stirling	Southern	Historic house	1930s period Victorian farmhouse and outbuildings
The Military Museums	Calgary	Calgary	Military	Canada's army, air force, and navy
Michener House Museum	Lacombe	Central	Historic house	information, information
Mile 0 Antique Truck Museum	Grimshaw	Northern	Transportation	Trucks used in northern cartage in the 1930s, 40s and 50s
Millet & District Museum	Millet	Edmonton Metropolitan	History	website, local history, period room displays
Mirror and District Museum	Mirror	Central	History	information, information, local history
Morrison Museum of the Country School	Islay	Central	Education	information
Mountain View Museum	Olds	Central	History	website, local history
Musée Girouxville Museum	Girouxville	Northern	History	information, local history
Musée Héritage Museum	St. Albert	Edmonton Metropolitan	History	Website, local history
Musée Morinville Museum	Morinville	Edmonton Metropolitan	History	website, local history
Musée St. Paul Museum	St. Paul	Edmonton Metropolitan	History	information, local history
Museum of Miniatures	Nanton	Southern	History/Educational/Toy	website, miniatures, model cars, antiques and dioramas
Museum of the Highwood	High River	Calgary	History	information, local history
Namao Museum	Namao	Edmonton Metropolitan	History	information
Nampa Museum	Nampa	Northern	History	information, information, local history
National Music Centre	Calgary	Calgary	Music	Canadian music heritage, includes Canadian Halls of Fame and Studio Bell for performances
Native Cultural Arts Museum	Grouard	Northern	First Nations	website, information, part of Northern Lakes College
Nickle Galleries	Calgary	Calgary	Art	website, part of the University of Calgary in the Taylor Family Digital Library, includes contemporary art, numismatic collection, rugs and textiles
Nordegg National Historic Site	Nordegg	Central	Mining	website, features Brazeau Collieries Industrial Museum coal mine site tours
North-West Mounted Police Barracks	Canmore	Rockies	Law enforcement	information, operated by the Canmore Museum and Geoscience Centre
Norwegian Laft Hus Museum	Red Deer	Central	Ethnic	information, history and culture of Norwegian Canadians
Nose Creek Valley Museum	Airdrie	Calgary	History	website, local cultural and natural history, First Nations artifacts, antique automobiles and farm machinery, minerals and fossils
Olds College Alumni Museum	Olds College	Olds	History	Olds College Alumni display of memorabilia and photos website
Oil Sands Discovery Centre	Fort McMurray	Northern	Industry	website, oil sands and petroleum industry
Okotoks Museum & Archives	Okotoks	Calgary	History	website, local history
Olympic Hall of Fame and Museum	Calgary	Calgary	Sports	Olympic memorabilia
Onoway Museum	Onoway	Central	History	website, local history
Oyen Crossroads Museum	Oyen	Central	History	website, local history
Pas-Ka-Poo Historical Park	Rimbey	Central	Open-air	website, includes 2 museum buildings and 10 historic buildings
Peace River Museum, Archives and Mackenzie Centre	Peace River	Northern	History	website, local history including fur trade, aboriginal artifacts and area settlement history
Pioneer Acres	Irricana	Calgary	Open-air	website, includes over 12 buildings, agriculture equipment, trucks, antiques, household items, general store, school
Philip J. Currie Dinosaur Museum	Wembley	Northern	Natural history	website, Alberta dinosaurs and fossils
Pioneer Thresherman's Museum	High Prairie	Northern	Agriculture	information, antique farming vehicles and implements
Plamondon & District Museum	Plamondon	Northern	History	information, located in a historic church, includes a 1926 Ford Model T, area pioneer heritage artifacts
Prairie Tractor Museum and Engine Society	Picture Butte	Southern	Open-air	website, historic buildings, train, and agriculture equipment
Prairie Art Gallery	Grande Prairie	Northern	Art	website
Profiles Public Art Gallery	St. Albert	Edmonton Metropolitan	Art	website
Raymond Pioneer Museum	Raymond	Southern	History	information, local history
Red Brick Arts Centre	Edson	Central	Multiple	information, includes an art gallery, school room museum and other cultural facilities
Red Deer Museum and Art Gallery	Red Deer	Central	Multiple	website, history and art of Central Alberta
Redcliff Museum	Redcliff	Southern	History	information, local history
Redwater & District Museum	Redwater	Edmonton Metropolitan	History	information, local history
Remington Carriage Museum	Cardston	Southern	Transportation	19th- and early 20th-century horse-drawn transportation
Reynolds-Alberta Museum	Wetaskiwin	Central	Multiple	"Power of the machine", includes automobiles, tractors and farm equipment, planes, motorcycles, bicycles, industrial machines, Canada's Aviation Hall of Fame
Rocky Mountain House Museum	Rocky Mountain House	Central	History	website, local history
Rocky Mountain House National Historic Site	Rocky Mountain House	Central	Open-air	website, remains of fur trading posts, artifacts, tours and performances
Rosebud Centennial Museum	Rosebud	Southern	History	website, local history
Rothney Astrophysical Museum	Hwy 22 south, Alberta	Southern	Science	website, astronomy
Royal Alberta Museum	Edmonton	Edmonton Metropolitan	Natural history	website
Royal Tyrrell Museum of Palaeontology	Drumheller	Southern	Natural history	website, dinosaurs and fossils
Rutherford House	Edmonton	Edmonton Metropolitan	Historic house	1915 period house, home of the first Premier of Alberta, Alexander Cameron Rutherford from 1911 to 1941
Ryley Museum	Ryley	Central	History	website, local history
Saddle Lake Cultural Museum	Saddle Lake	Central	First Nations	information, information, information
Saint Ann Ranch Country Inn Museum	Trochu	Central	Open-air	information
St. Albert Grain Elevator Park	St. Albert	Northern	Open-air	Features two historic grain elevators and a reconstructed railway station
Scandia Eastern Irrigation District Museum	Scandia	Southern	Open-air	Museum depicting agricultural and irrigation history in Eastern Alberta.
Seba Beach Heritage Museum	Seba Beach	Central	History	information, local history
Sedgewick Archives Gallery & Museum	Sedgewick	Central	History	information, local history
Sexsmith Blacksmith Shop Museum	Sexsmith	Northern	Industry	information, information, historic working blacksmith shop
Smithson International Truck Museum	Rimbey	Central	Transportation	website, trucks, license plates, farm machinery, automobiles, sawmill
Smoky Lake Museum	Smoky Lake	Central	History	website, local history
Sodbusters Archives & Museum	Strome	Central	History	information, local history
South Peace Centennial Museum	Beaverlodge	Northern	Open-air	40-acre (160,000 m^{2}) agricultural pioneer village with restored antique tractors, steam engines, stationary engines, horse-drawn wagons, carriages and antique automobiles
Southern Alberta Art Gallery	Lethbridge	Southern	Art	
Spirit River and District Museum	Spirit River	Northern	Open-air	website
Spruce Grove Grain Elevator Museum	Spruce Grove	Edmonton Metropolitan	Agriculture	Historic grain elevator with agriculture exhibits
St. Jacques Heritage House Museum	Beaumont	Edmonton	History	One of Beaumont's longest standing buildings
Stavely Museum	Stavely	South	Museum	website, Our 34 year old museum is located in the small town of Stavely, Alberta. The Stavely Museum features displays from the late 1880's to the mid 1900's.
Stephansson House	Markerville	Central	Historic house	website, 1927 period home of famous Icelandic poet Stephan G. Stephansson
Stony Plain Pioneer Museum	Stony Plain	Edmonton Metropolitan	History	
Strathcona County Museum	Sherwood Park	Edmonton Metropolitan	History	website, local history, period room and business displays
	Sundre	Central	Multiple	website, includes the World of Wildlife Museum with mounted animals from around the world, and a collection of historic buildings
Sunnybrook Farm Museum	Red Deer	Central	Farm	website, 1905 farm, evolution of rural life in Central Alberta
Taber Irrigation Impact Museum	Taber	Southern	Agriculture	information
Telephone Historical Centre	Edmonton	Edmonton Metropolitan	Technology	Antique telephones and telecommunications technology. Permanently closed in 2019
Telus Spark	Calgary	Calgary	Science	
Telus World of Science	Edmonton	Edmonton Metropolitan	Science	Science and space
Thorhild Museum	Thorhild	Central	History	information, local history
Three Rivers Rock and Fossil Museum	Pincher Creek	Southern	Natural history	information, rocks, fossils and minerals
Tofield Historical Museum	Tofield	Central	History	website, local history
Town & Country Museum	Stettler	Central	Open-air	website
Trochu and District Museum	Trochu	Central	History	information, local history
Two Hills Historical Museum	Two Hills	Central	History	website, local history
Ukrainian Canadian Archives & Museum Of Alberta	Edmonton	Edmonton Metropolitan	Ethnic	
Ukrainian Cultural Heritage Village	Lamont County	Central	Living	Lives of Ukrainian Canadian settlers from the years 1899 to 1938
University of Alberta Museums	Edmonton	Edmonton Metropolitan	Multiple	website, public displays and teaching collections; public displays include Human Ecology Collection of clothing and textiles, Mineral and Petrology Museum, Paleontology Museum, Print Study Centre, W.G. Hardy Museum of Ancient Near Eastern and Classical Antiquities, Enterprise Square Galleries exhibits of fine arts, sciences, and humanities
University of Lethbridge Art Gallery	Lethbridge	Southern	Art	website
Valley Doll Museum	Drumheller	Southern	Toy	information, over 700 dolls in historic scenes
Vegreville Regional Museum	Vegreville	Central	History	information, local history
Victoria School Museum	Edmonton	Edmonton Metropolitan	Education	information, history of the Victoria School of Performing and Visual Arts
Victoria Settlement	Smoky Lake	Central	History	
Viking Museum	Viking	Central	History	information, local history
Wainwright Museum	Wainwright	Central	History	information, local history
Wainwright Rail Park	Wainwright	Central	Railway	website
Walter Phillips Gallery	Banff	Rockies	Art	Contemporary art
Wanham Grizzly Bear Prairie Museum	Wanham	Northern	Open-air	information
Waterton Heritage Centre	Waterton Park	Southern	History	website, local natural and cultural history
Westlock Pioneer Museum	Westlock	Central	History	information, local history
Wetaskiwin and District Heritage Museum	Wetaskiwin	Central	History	Local history, heritage, and culture in an historic building
Wheels of Time Museum	Caroline	Central	History	information, information
Whitecourt and District Forest Interpretive Centre and Heritage Park	Whitecourt	Central	Forestry	website
Whyte Museum	Banff	Rockies	Multiple	Culture, art and history of the Rocky Mountains of Canada
Women's Art Museum of Canada	Edmonton	Central	Visual Arts	website
Yesteryear Artefacts Museum	Rowley	Southern	History	website, information
Youthlink Calgary Police Interpretive Centre	Calgary	Calgary	History and Culture of the Calgary Police Service	website
Lac La Biche Museum and Visitor Information Centre	Lac La Biche	Northern	History	website, local, cultural, and natural history

== See also ==
- Nature centres in Alberta
