= Ellis Bird Farm =

Wildlife sanctuary in Alberta, Canada

Ellis Nature Centre
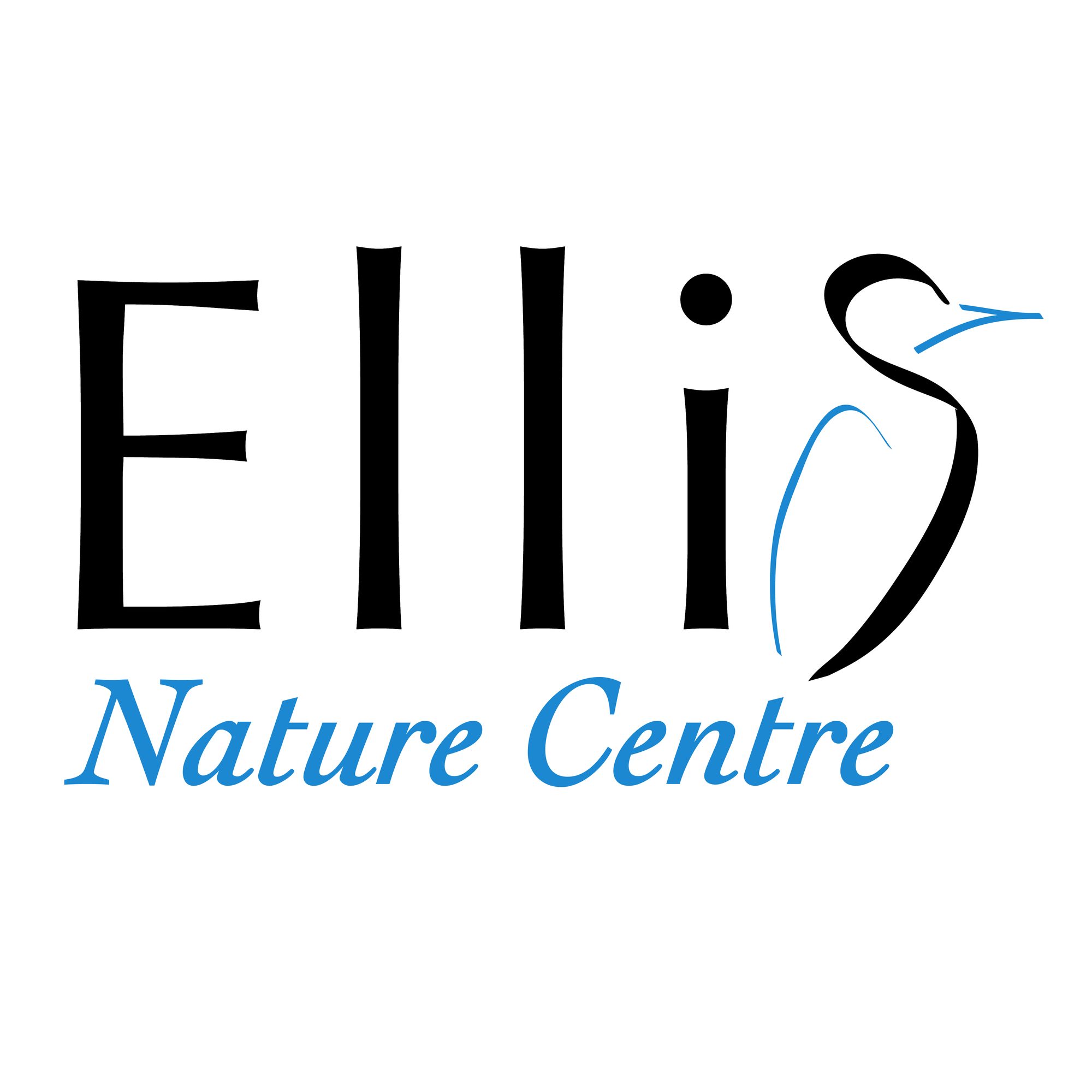

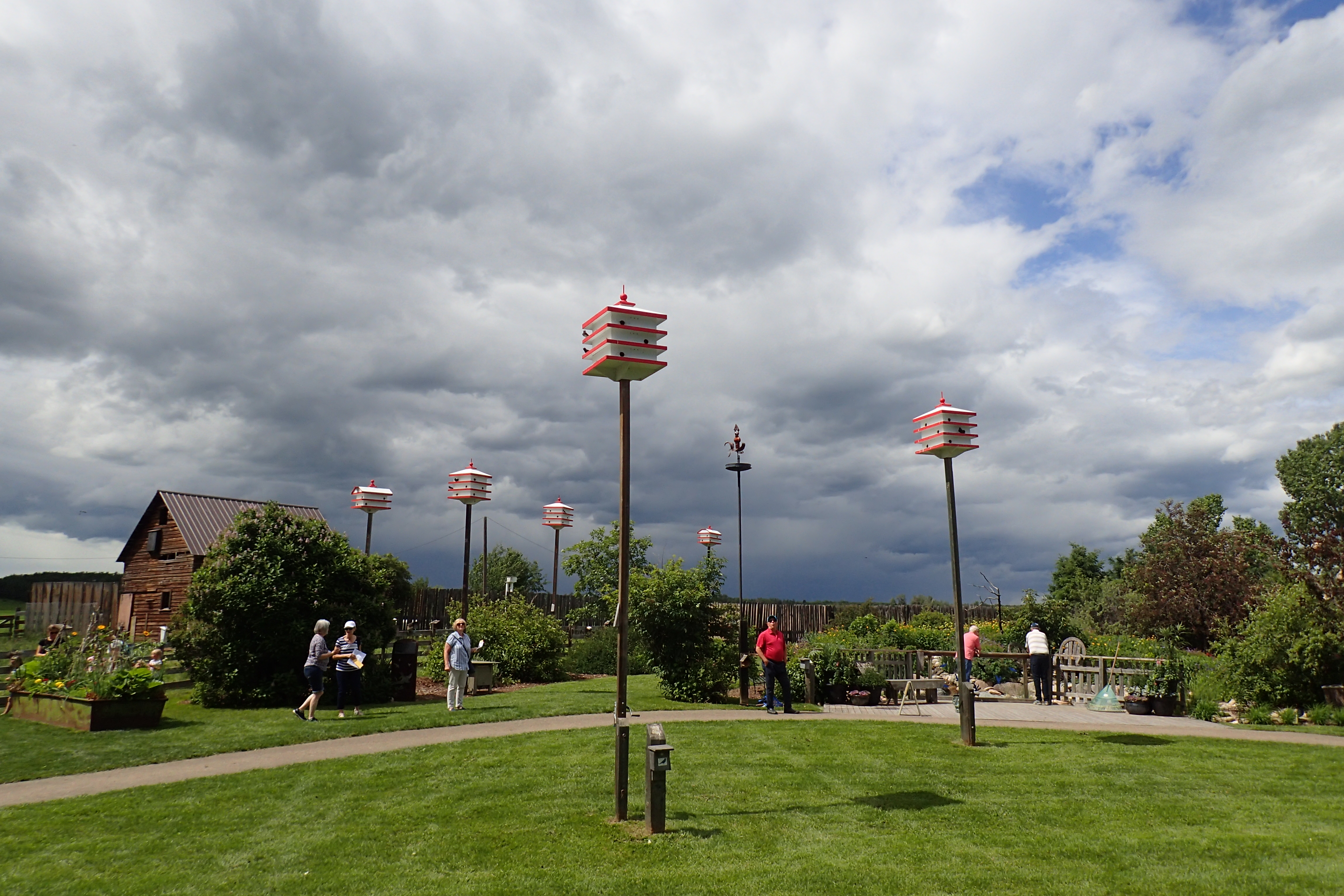
- Bluebird nestboxes
- Former name: Ellis Bird Farm
- Location: 39502 Range Rd 260, Lacombe County, AB T4L 1W7, Canada
- Coordinates: 52.390163°N 113.604298°W
- Type: open-air, agriculture
- Website: ellisnaturecentre.ca

Ellis Nature Centre is a non-profit organization located near Joffre, Alberta dedicated to wildlife conservation, environmental education, and sustainable agriculture. Formerly known as Ellis Bird Farm, the site started by Charlie and Winnie Ellis, who transformed their family farm into a sanctuary for birds and other wildlife.

== Historical background ==
The Ellis family originally settled in Alberta in 1906, establishing a homestead in the Joffre district. Charlie Ellis, born in 1901, began his conservation efforts in the 1950s by installing nesting boxes for mountain bluebirds. Over time, he expanded his efforts to include tree swallows, black-capped chickadees, purple martins, and flickers. By the late 1970s, the farm had achieved the highest recorded density of nesting bluebirds.

In the early 1980s, Union Carbide sought to build an ethylene glycol plant near the farm. During negotiations to acquire land from Charlie Ellis, the company agreed to preserve his conservation legacy. This led to the establishment of Ellis Bird Farm Ltd., a non-profit organization dedicated to continuing Charlie’s work. Dow Chemical later inherited this commitment and partnered with MEGlobal Canada to provide ongoing support for operations.

In 2024, Ellis Bird Farm was renamed Ellis Nature Centre to better reflect its broader mission encompassing conservation, education, and regenerative agriculture. The Centre now manages over 480 acres of agricultural land and continues Charlie's practices such as delayed haying and rotational grazing to support wildlife habitats.

== Educational programs ==
Ellis Nature Centre features gardens, wetlands, nature trails, and a historical grain elevator birdhouse wall. The Centre offers hands-on outdoor education programs aimed at inspiring environmental stewardship among youth and event like the Bug Jamboree and Bluebird Festival. Children can explore interactive displays featuring goats, chickens, honeybees, and wetlands.

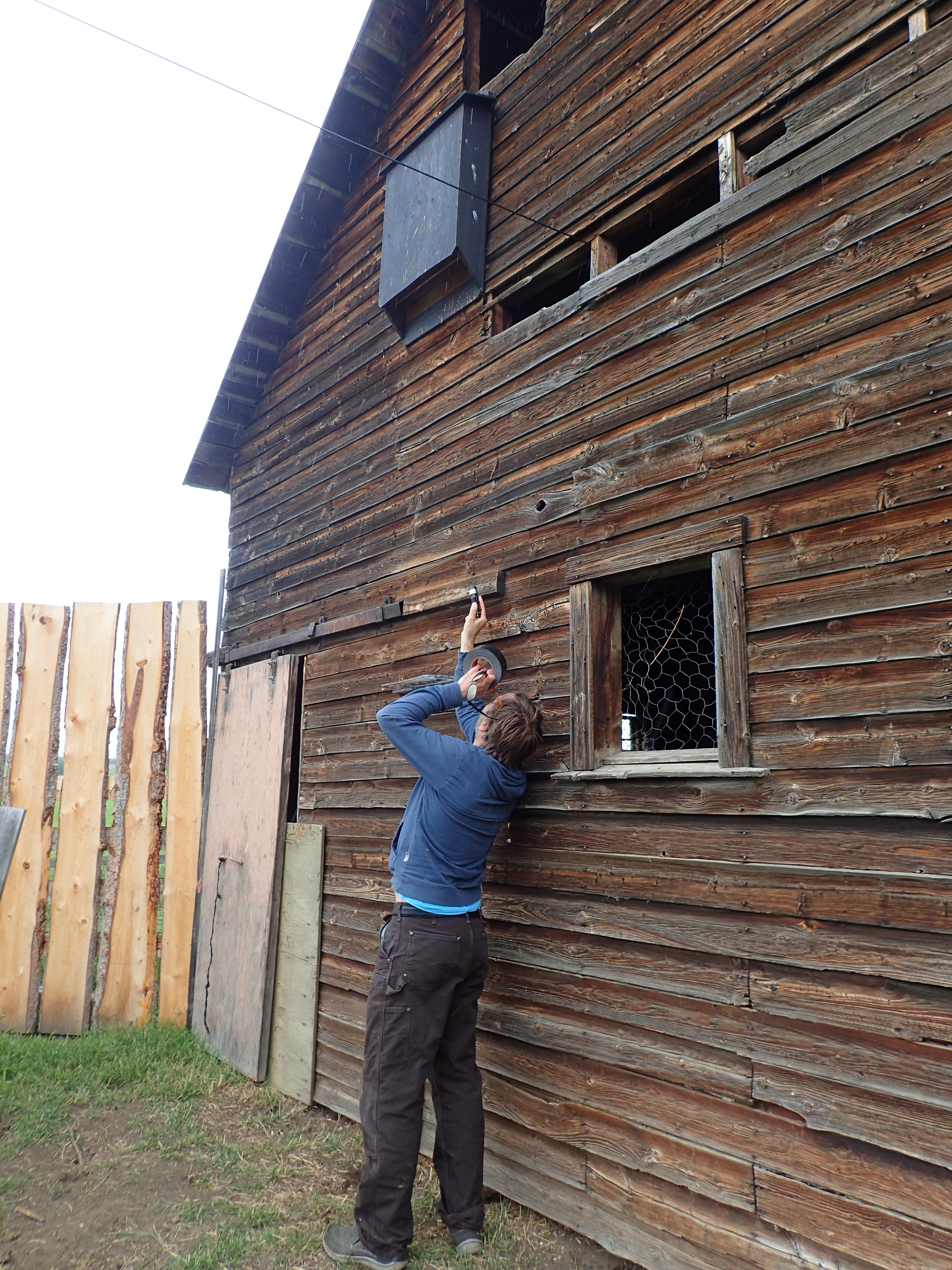
Bat House Project

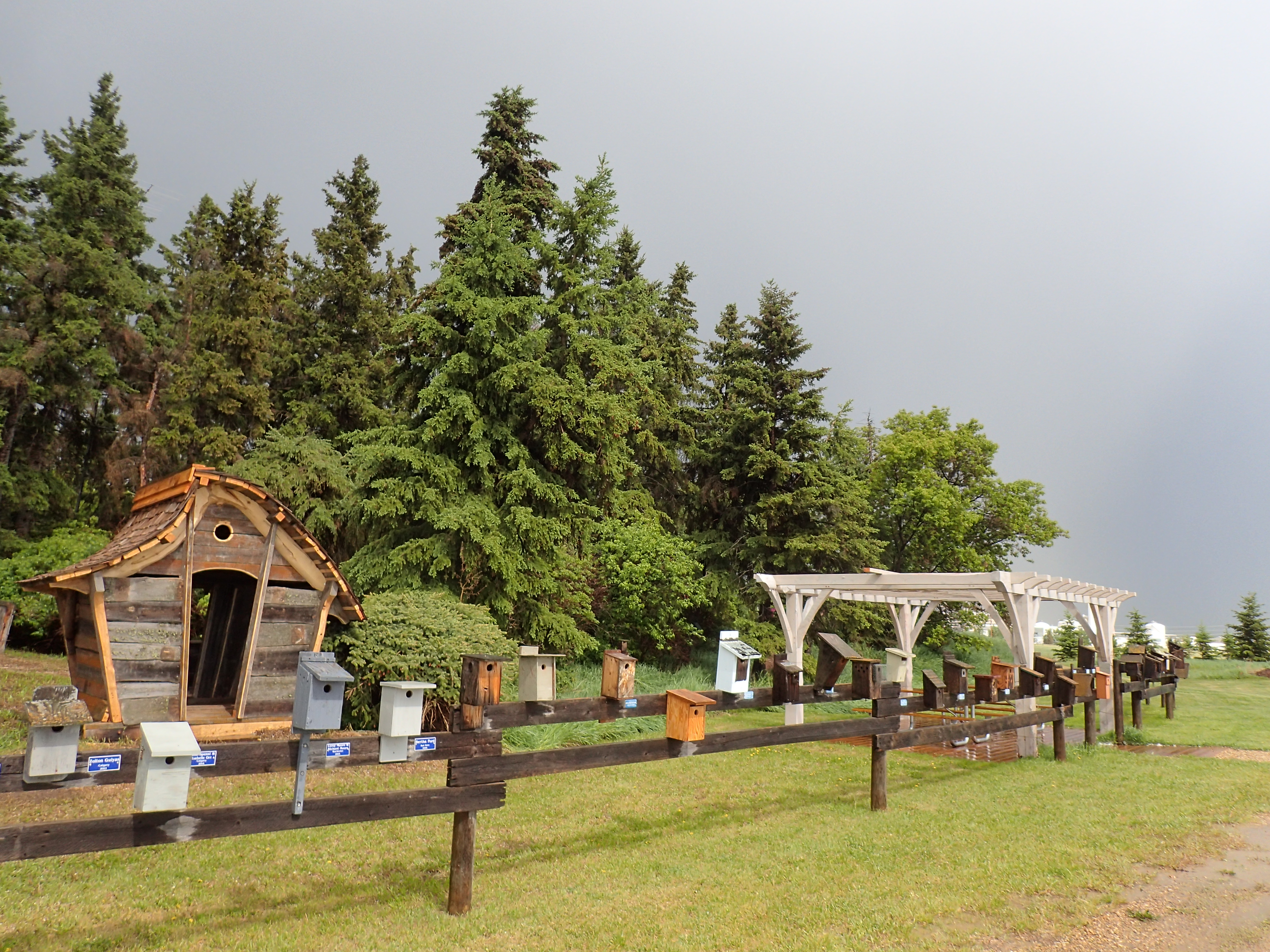
Bluebird nests

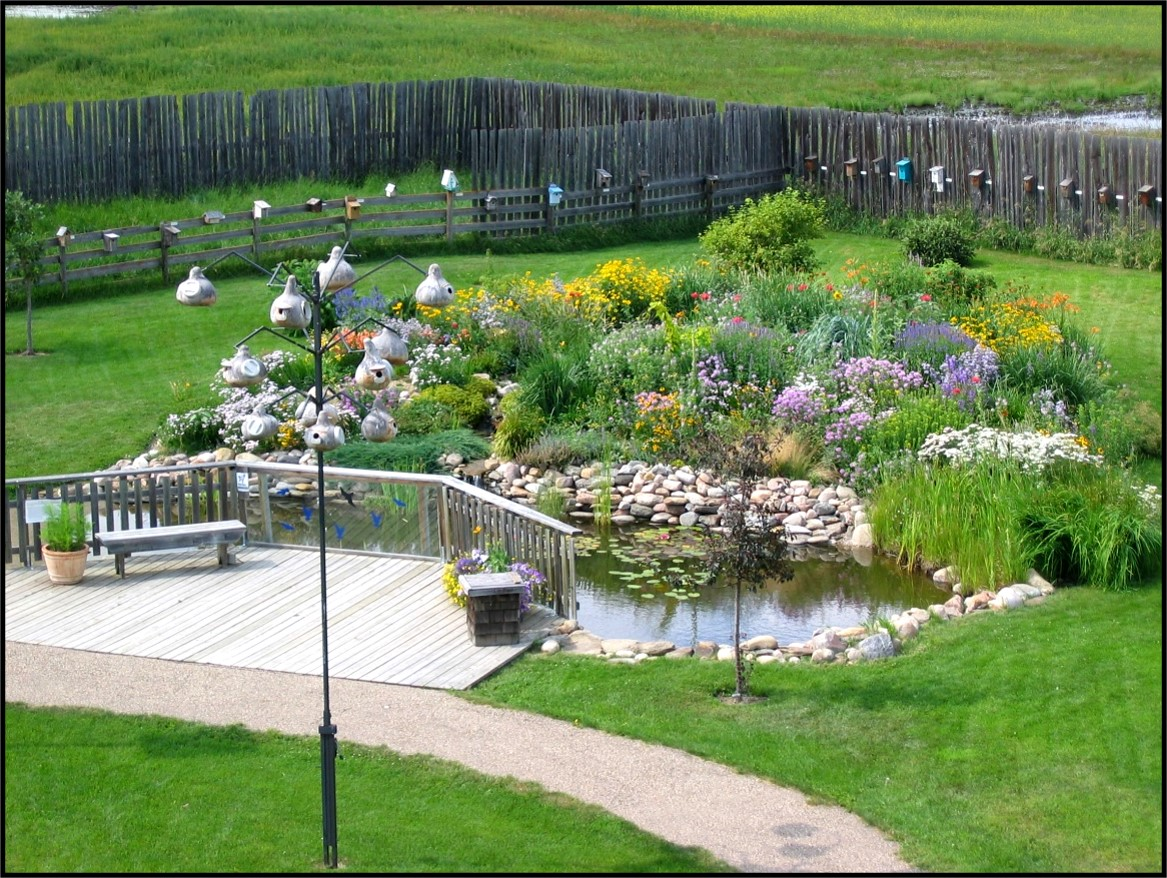
Landscapes

== See also ==
- List of museums in Alberta
