= Jasper-Yellowhead Museum =

Coordinates: 52°52′45″N 118°05′11″W

Jasper-Yellowhead Museum and Archives
- Location: Jasper, Alberta, Canada
- Type: History museum
- Website: https://jaspermuseum.org/

The Jasper-Yellowhead Museum and Archives (also known as the Jasper Museum) is a historical museum located in Jasper National Park, Alberta.

== History ==
The Jasper-Yellowhead Historical Society began working towards the development of a museum in 1978, and in 1985 a partially completed building was purchased for the project.

== Exhibits ==
=== Fred Kofin Historical Gallery ===
This permanent exhibit was previously named the Jasper Museum Historical Gallery, before being renamed in 2010 in honour of the Jasper-Yellowhead Historical Society's longest serving treasurer. The exhibit includes displays about the fur trade, the railway, and early exploration and tourism in Jasper National Park.

=== Wildlife display ===
After the 2024 Jasper wildfires the museum displayed over 100 taxidermy wildlife specimens across the museum. The specimens were previously acquired several years ago from the Wildlife Museum, which was previously located in the basement of Whistlers Inn. An Adopt-An-Animal campaign was also launched to help support the museum and archives after the wildlife. "Adopting" a specimen included naming rights for the specimen, an adoption certificate, a picture of the animal, a free visit per month, and a tax receipt.

=== Showcase exhibit ===
==== Past exhibits ====
- From the Wilds of Jasper
- Jasper and the Group of Seven
- Festival of Trees
- Jasper: As It Was by Harry Rowed

== See also ==
- List of museums in Alberta
