= South Peace Centennial Museum =

Museum in Alberta, Canada

- Location: Beaverlodge, Alberta, Canada
- Coordinates: 55.228°N 119.447°W
- Type: open-air, living history
- Website: http://www.southpeacemuseum.com/

The South Peace Centennial Museum is an open-air museum in west-central Alberta, Canada. The museum's buildings include a trading post, church, school, Grist mill, community hall, General store, Blacksmith shop, barn, carriage house, railway buildings, and homesteaders' cabins. The museum also features an extensive collection of antique tractors, a steam engine, stationary engines, horse-drawn wagons, carriages and antique automobiles. The museum features a miniature train track for visitors.

The museum received community grant funding from the County of Grande Prairie in 2019.

In 2025, the museum received community grant funding from the government of Alberta.

== See also ==
- List of museums in Alberta
