= Stephansson House =

Historic building in Alberta, Canada

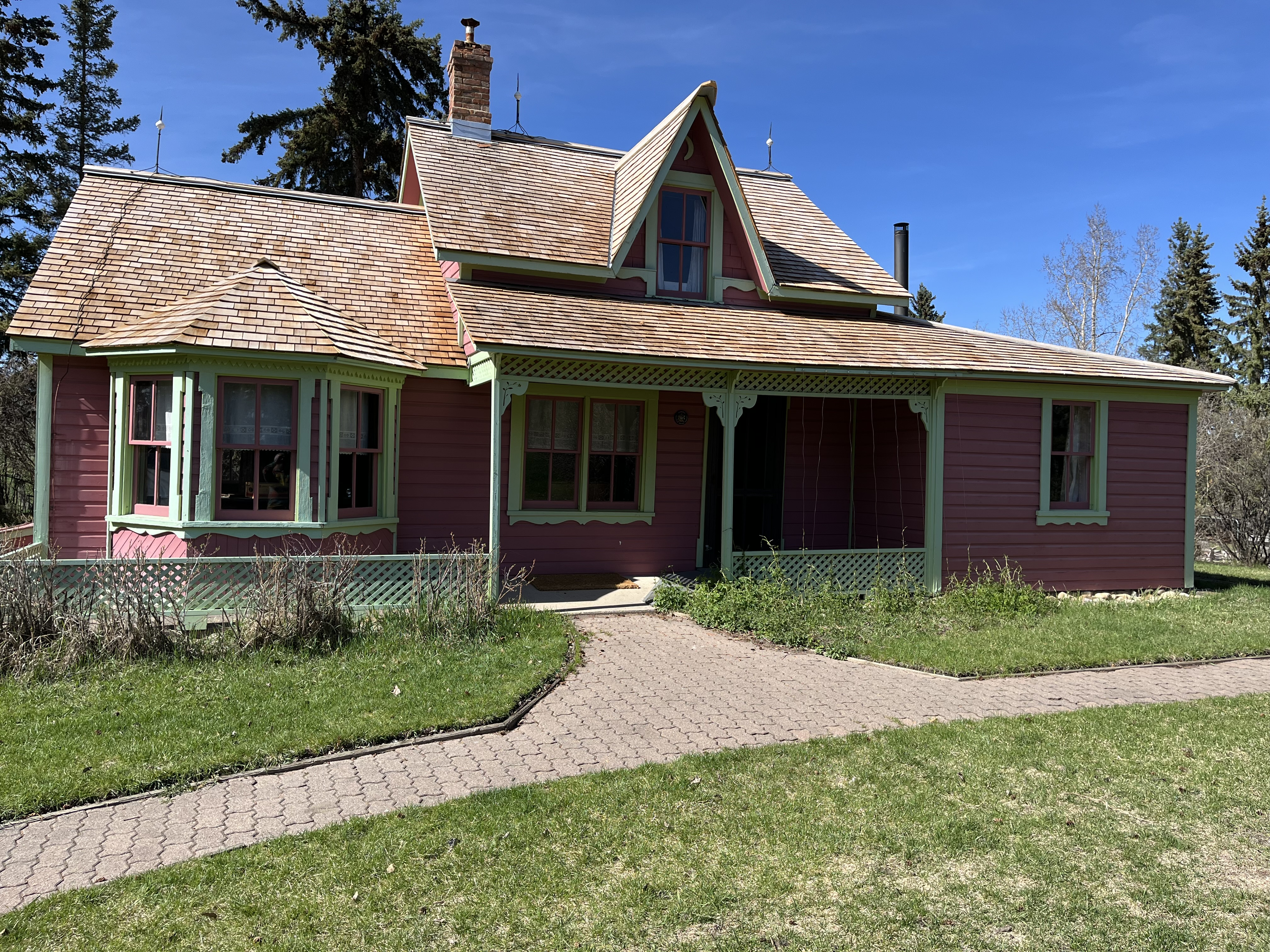
- Stephansson House, 2024
- Alternative names: Stephansson House Provincial Historic Site

General information
- Status: Completed
- Type: Museum
- Address: 2230 Township Rd 371, Red Deer County, AB T4G 0M9
- Country: Canada
- Coordinates: 52.15925°N 114.20113°W
- Named for: Stephan G. Stephansson
- Year(s) built: 1889-1927
- Owner: Government of Alberta

Height
- Architectural: Victorian & Neo-gothic

Website
- https://stephanssonhouse.ca/

Alberta Historic Resources Act
- Type: Provincial Historic Site
- Designated: 18 May 1976

Stephansson House is a historic building and museum located on 1.7 hectares of land in Red Deer County, north of Markerville, Alberta. The structure was the home of Stephan G. Stephansson, an Icelandic-Canadian poet, from 1889 until 1927, and has been designated as an Alberta provincial historic site.

== Overview ==
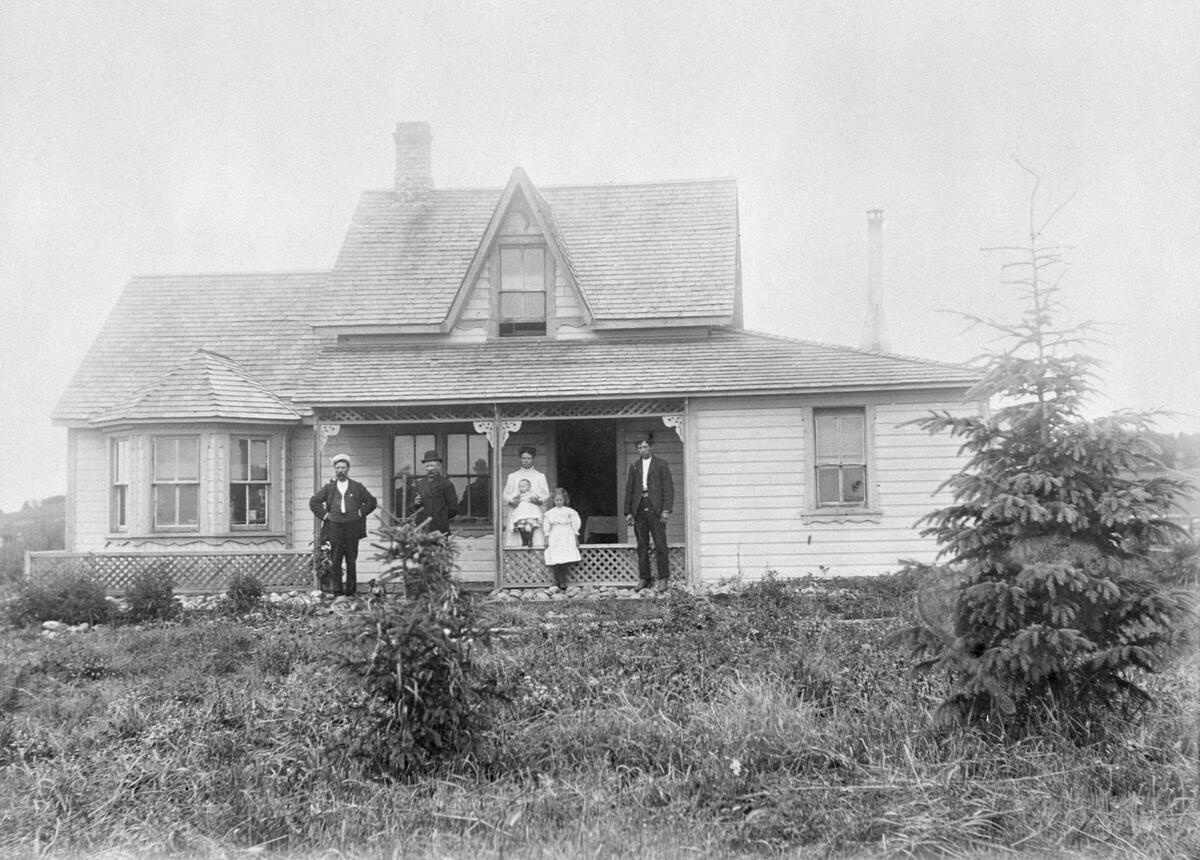
Stephansson House north of Markerville, Alberta (1907)

Stephansson House was built by Stephan G. Stephansson beginning in 1889 following his family's relocation from Gardar, North Dakota. Over the years the home saw several additions and was steadily improved as needed and as economic conditions allowed. Following Stephan's death in 1927, the home continued to be occupied until the early 1950s whereupon it sat vacant. After sitting empty for two decades, the newly incorporated Stephan G. Stephansson Icelandic Society worked with the Alberta Government to restore the home and outbuildings. Following extensive renovations, the home was opened in 1975 and was designated a Provincial Historic Site the following year. Today, Stephansson House is operated by the Ministry of Arts, Culture and Status of Women (Alberta Culture), and is open from mid-May to early September.

== Architecture ==
The one-and-a-half storey structure is approximately 800 square feet in size, and is peculiar in its architecture as it not distinctly Icelandic or Victorian in design. Rather, the home is practical and reflects the building conventions of many early pioneer homes found throughout the Canadian west which were improved and decorated as time and economic conditions permitted. Decorative Victorian and Neo-gothic elements were added to the home in later years, such as the decorative latticework, scrollwork, floral ornamentation, veranda, and bay window.

The exterior of the home is clad in tongue and groove siding, used to cover the original log construction. The siding was painted red, while the latticework and trim were painted lime-green. The home also has three lightning rods, added following the death of Stephansson's son.

== History ==
In 1889, Stephansson, accompanied by his pregnant wife Helga, mother Guðbjörg, and three children, Baldur, Guðmundur (Mundi), and Jakob, moved from Gardar to the Markerville region seeking improved conditions. They were accompanied by several other Icelandic families from the Gardar region. Arriving in late autumn, Stephansson and his family squatted on an un-surveyed plot of land north of the Red Deer River, whereupon he hastily constructed a simple, small log cabin. He obtained logs from the banks of the nearby Medicine River upstream of his homestead as he was unable to afford prepared lumber. Shortly following the completion of the simple home, Helga gave birth to twin girls, Stephaný and Jóný.

In the spring of 1890, Stephansson began to plow the land and make meagre improvements to the home. In the late summer, he also travelled to the Edmonton region after hearing reports of excellent agricultural land. Despite finding that growing conditions were preferable to that in Markerville, Stephansson decided not to relocate to Edmonton.

Additions to the small home were largely made as needed and as finances allowed. Stephansson, although well known for his poetic works later in life, was not wealthy and made a meagre income as a farmer, supplemented by other temporary employment. The first major addition was made in 1893, following the birth of Stephansson and Helga's sixth child, a son named Gestur. His birth prompted the construction of several additional rooms to the small log home which was becoming increasingly cramped. Two rooms on the north side of the home for Stephansson's mother Guðbjörg and daughters Stephaný and Jóný were added, alongside a study, a front room, and a sleeping quarters upstairs for the boys. The home was further enlarged over the course of 1898, with a new kitchen complete with a pantry being added to the eastern side of the home. A new bedroom for Stephaný and Jóný was added on the south side, allowing the two rooms on the north side to be occupied solely by Guðbjörg. These additions required the constriction of a completely new roof, and it was at this time Stephansson also added a veranda and bay window.

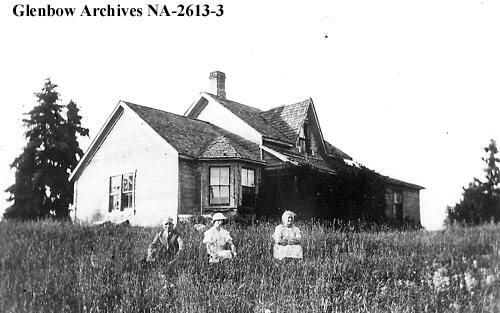
Stephansson House, north of Markerville, Alberta (1907)

Although having made substantial improvements to the home and property, Stephansson did not obtain title to his home until 1898 following the completion of surveying in the Red Deer region. In January 1898, he applied for a homestead on land adjacent to his home. The land consisted largely of sloughs which he used to cultivate hay for his livestock. In July, he directed his mother Guðbjörg apply for a homestead on the land the family cultivated and had built their home. To fulfil residency requirements for his parcel of slough land, Stephansson built a simple log home and occupied it for one year, while his family lived in the main permanent residence. At some point, he also clad the home in siding to disguise the original log structure and added decorative latticework to the home, likely made by his son Mundi who was a skilled carpenter. To enhance the attractiveness of the home, the siding was painted red and the latticework and trim lime-green.

Three lightning rods were added to the roof of the family home by Stephansson following the tragic death of Gestur in July 1909, who was struck and killed by lightning while trying to reach the safety of the home. Apart from the addition of the lightning rods, the home remained largely unchanged from then on until Stephansson's death in 1927.

Following Stephansson's death, his son Jakob continued to live in the home and farm the land, assisted by his nephew Edwin Stephanson. Following Jakob's death in 1958, Edwin continued to farm the land for several years, although the home was left vacant.

After sitting empty for almost two decades, the Stephan G. Stephansson Icelandic Society and the Alberta government began the restoration of the home in 1974. Following extensive renovations to restore the home back to 1927 condition, the home was opened as a museum on 10 August 1975. It was designated a Provincial Historic Site on 18 May 1976. Many of the historic artifacts in the home are originals, having been obtained from the family and Markerville community.

== Stephan G. Stephansson Icelandic Society ==
The Stephan G. Stephansson Icelandic Society (SGSIS) was formed in 1974 with the intention of restoring landmarks in the Markerville region, including Stephansson's residence, the Markerville Creamery (1986), Fensala Hall (2006), Markerville Lutheran Church (2009), and the Markerville Buttermaker's House (2023). SGSIS continues to manage all sites except Stephansson's residence.
