= Alberta Central Railway Museum =

Museum in Alberta, Canada

Coordinates: 52.881°N 113.294°W

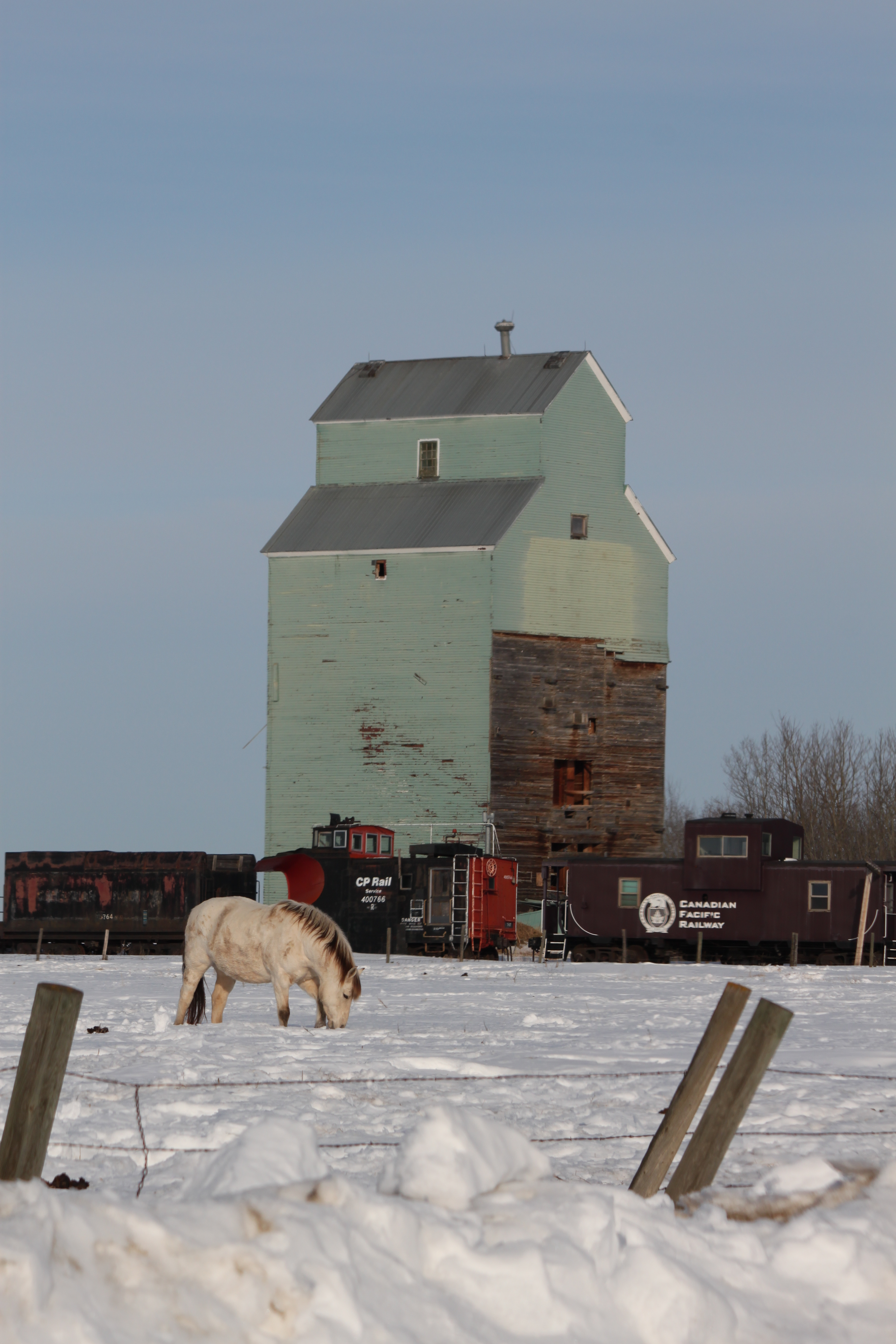
- Location: Wetaskiwin, Alberta, Canada
- Type: Railroad
- Website: www.abcentralrailway.com

The Alberta Central Railway Museum is a railway museum located south-east of the City of Wetaskiwin, in Central Alberta, Canada. The main building was designed as a scaled-down version of the City's 1907 Canadian Pacific Railway depot. The depot includes a waiting room, baggage room and telegraph office, as well as exhibits and railroad artifacts. Railroad equipment includes locomotives, a sleeper car, passenger coach, freight equipment, cabooses, freight cars and a snowplough. Attractions include a model train layout of the original Wetaskiwin railyard. The museum also features a 1906 Alberta Grain Co. grain elevator which was moved from Maskwacis. The elevator is known to be Alberta's second-oldest grain elevator in the Province. Rides are given on a one-mile loop of track.

== See also ==
- List of museums in Alberta
