= Creative Kids Museum =

- Established: 2011
- Location: Calgary, Alberta, Canada
- Coordinates: 51.04739°N 114.08906°W
- Type: Children's museum
- Website: www.sparkscience.ca/explore/ckm/

The Creative Kids Museum, a part of TELUS Spark located in Calgary, Alberta, Canada. The Children's museum, which opened in October 2011, focuses on hands-on explorations of music, theater and visual arts and is Canada's first hands-on museum dedicated exclusively to the arts.

== Affiliations ==
The Museum is affiliated with: CMA, CHIN, and Virtual Museum of Canada.
