= Markerville Lutheran Church =

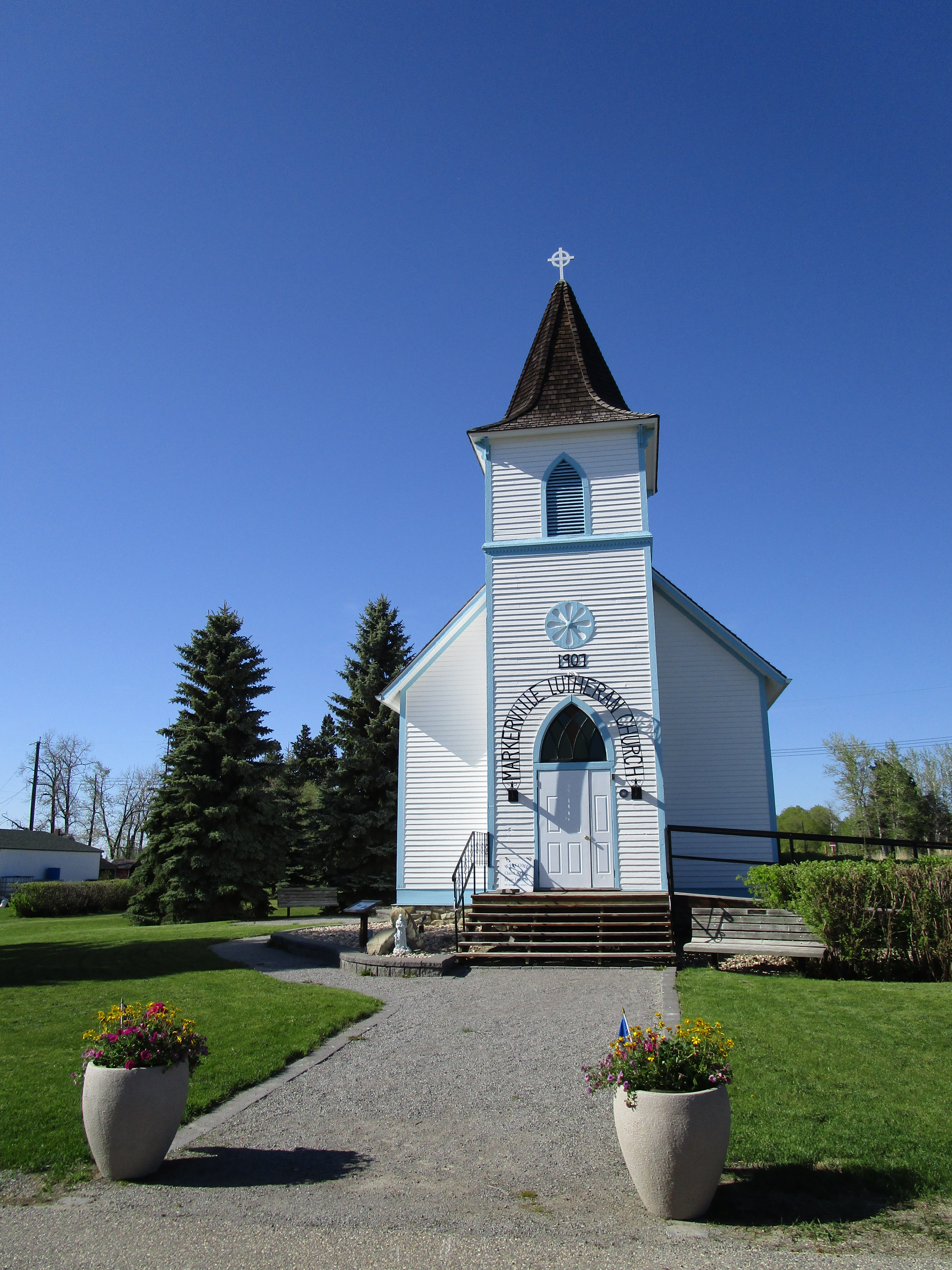
- Markerville Lutheran Church
- Interactive map of the Markerville Lutheran Church area

General information
- Location: Markerville, Red Deer County, Alberta, Canada
- Coordinates: 52°07′28.9″N 114°10′12.0″W
- Construction started: 1907
- Completed: 1907

Technical details
- Structural system: wooden

Markerville Lutheran Church is a Lutheran church in the hamlet of Markerville, Alberta, built in 1907. Its history is tied to the Icelandic community in Alberta and remains the only Icelandic Lutheran Church ever built in the province.

== Description ==
The Markerville Lutheran Church is small in size, measuring twelve metres by seven metres at the base. It is a gable roofed building with a white-painted wooden exterior and a cedar shingled roof. It has four windows on either side and a bell tower in front with an eight-sided steeple featuring louvered windows on all four sides. The entrance is covered by an iron sign and the front of the bell tower features a blue decorative wheel.

== History ==
Markerville was first settled in 1888 by Icelandic settlers under the name Tindastoll. Most of the residents worked at the Creamery which was built in 1902, the same year the name of the town was changed to Markerville in honor of Dairy Commissioner C. P. Marker. Construction began on the church in January 1907 and continued until December of the same year, with the local community raising funds for the building. Regular service at the church stopped in 1963. In 2006, the original stained glass of the church was destroyed in a hail storm. The building was recognized as a Provincial Historic Resource by the Alberta government in 2009.
