= Markerville =

- Hamlet
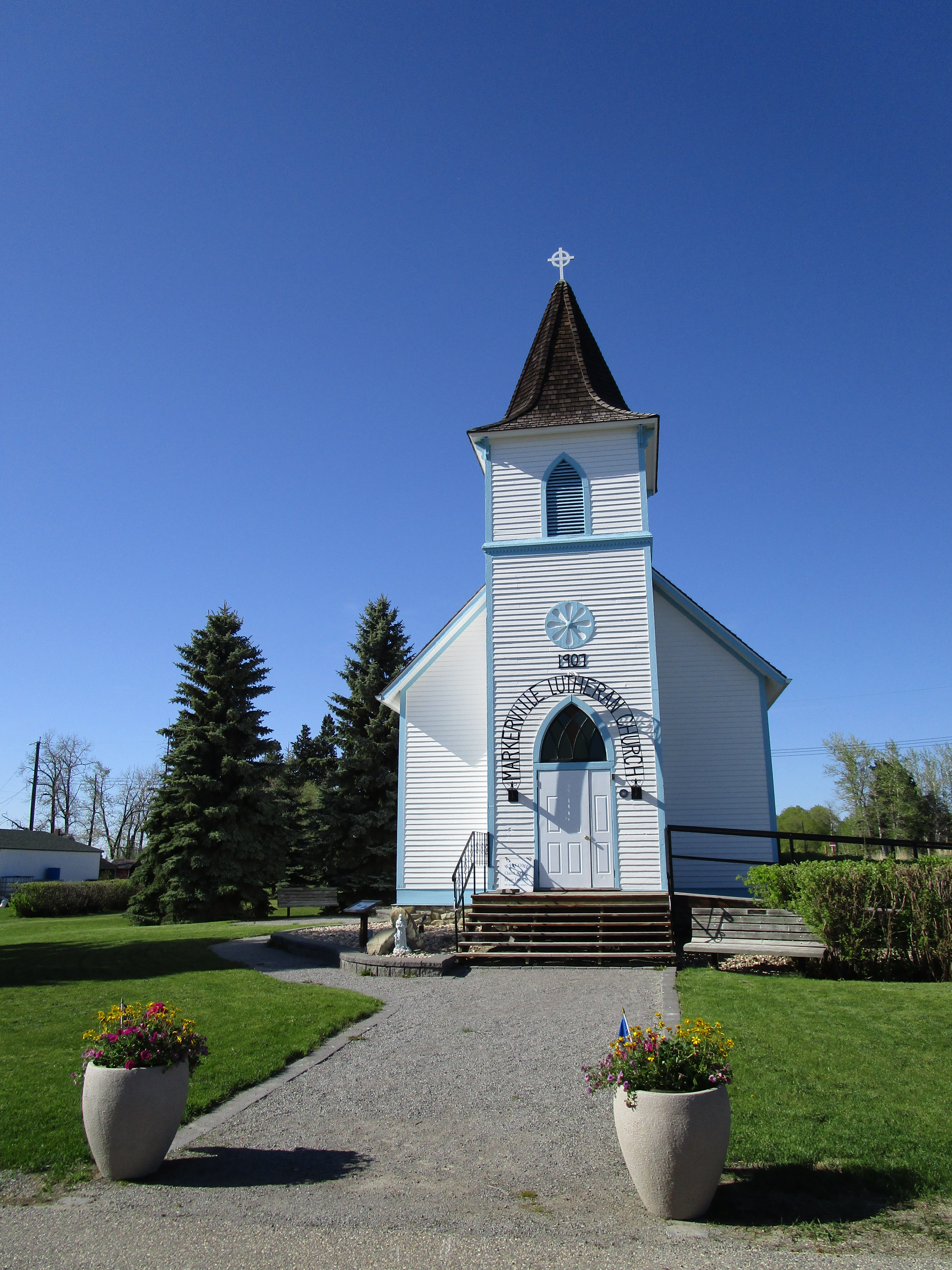
- Markerville Lutheran Church, built in 1907

- Location of Markerville Markerville (Canada)
- Coordinates: 52°07′25″N 114°10′14″W
- Country: Canada
- Province: Alberta
- Region: Central Alberta
- Census division: 8
- Municipal district: Red Deer County

Government
  - Type: Unincorporated
  - Governing body: Red Deer County Council

Area (2021)
  - Land: 0.17 km^{2} (0.066 sq mi)

Population (2021)
  - Total: 38
  - Density: 219.8/km^{2} (569/sq mi)
- Time zone: UTC−06:00 (Alberta Time)
- Area codes: 403, 587, 825

Markerville is a hamlet in central Alberta, Canada within Red Deer County. It is located 4 kilometres (2.5 mi) north of Highway 54, approximately 29 kilometres (18 mi) southwest of Red Deer.

Markerville was the home for many years of Stephan G. Stephansson, famous in modern Icelandic literature, whose home, Stephansson House, is preserved as an Alberta Provincial Historic Site.

== Demographics ==
Population history of Markerville
Year	Pop.	±%
1971	40	—
1976	33	−17.5%
1981	57	+72.7%
1986	48	−15.8%
1991	55	+14.6%
1996	50	−9.1%
2001	50	+0.0%
2006	50	+0.0%
2011	42	−16.0%
2016	45	+7.1%
2021	38	−15.6%
Source: Statistics Canada

In the 2021 Census of Population conducted by Statistics Canada, Markerville had a population of 38 living in 17 of its 18 total private dwellings, a change of −15.6% from its 2016 population of 45. With a land area of 0.17 km^{2} (0.066 sq mi), it had a population density of 223.5/km^{2} (578.9/sq mi) in 2021.

As a designated place in the 2016 Census of Population conducted by Statistics Canada, Markerville had a population of 45 living in 19 of its 22 total private dwellings, a change of 7.1% from its 2011 population of 42. With a land area of 0.19 km^{2} (0.073 sq mi), it had a population density of 236.8/km^{2} (613.4/sq mi) in 2016.

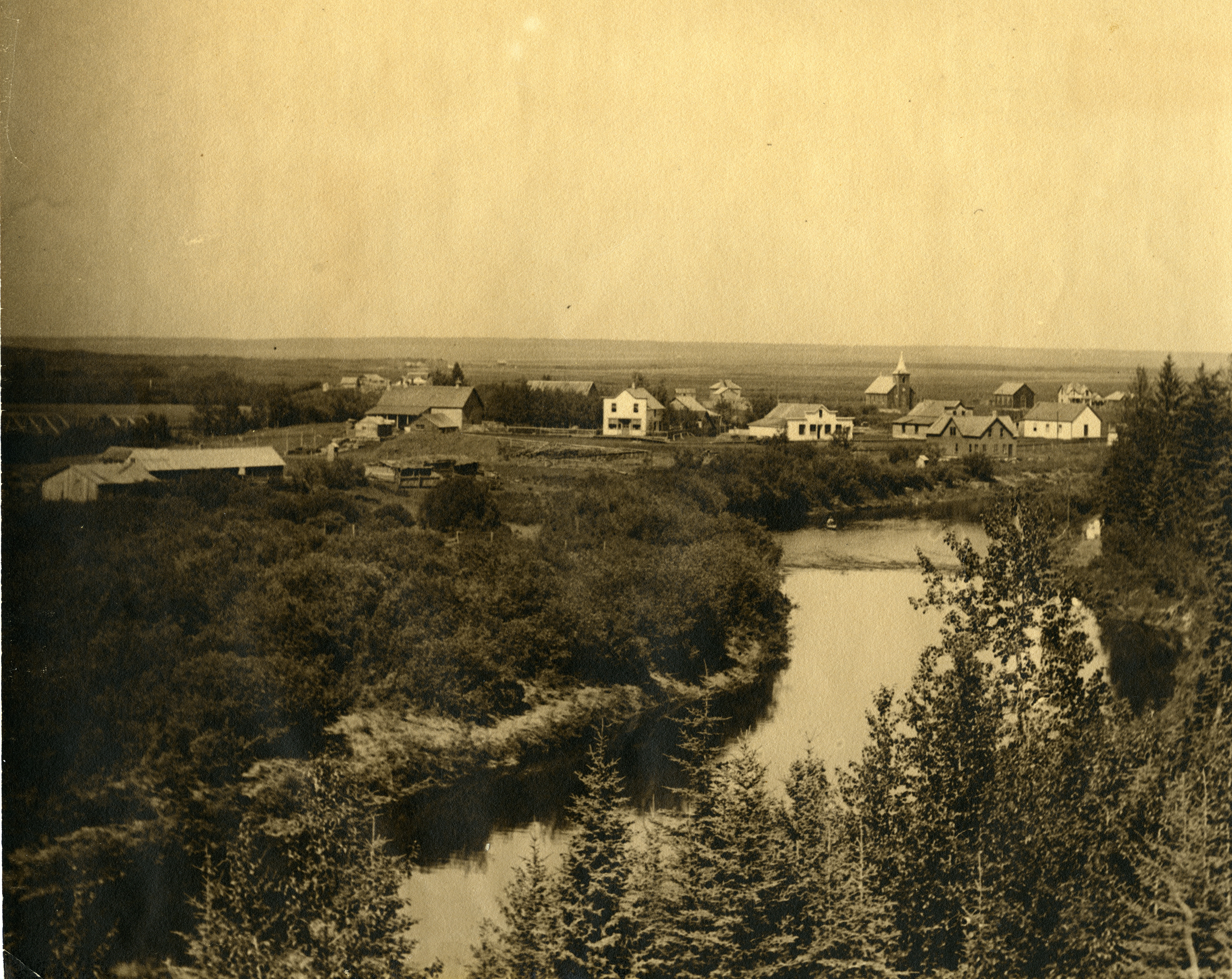
Markerville, Alberta, 1932

== See also ==
- List of communities in Alberta
- List of designated places in Alberta
- List of hamlets in Alberta
