= Fort Normandeau =

Coordinates: 52°15′36.0″N 113°52′43.9″W

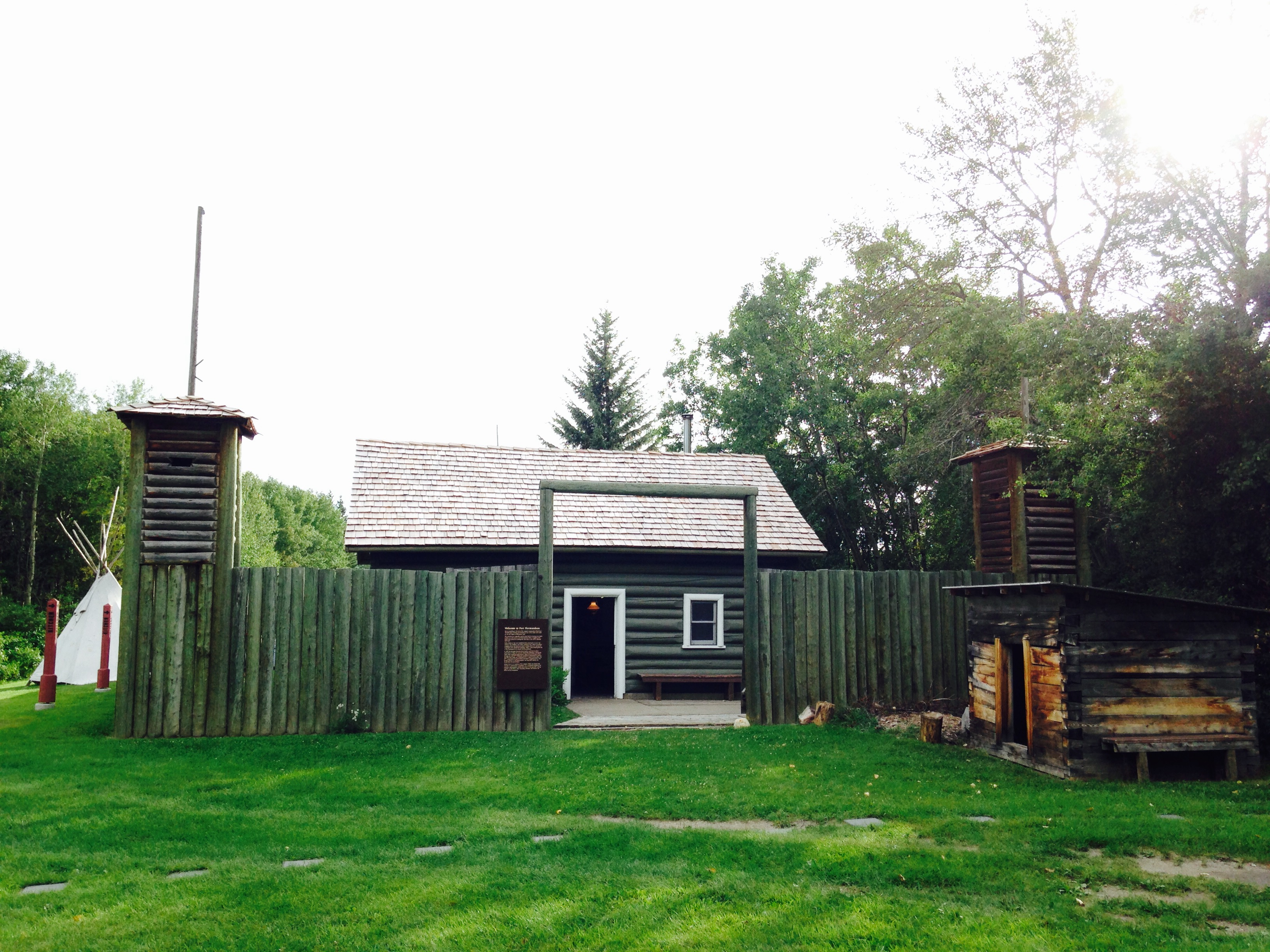
- Fort Normandeau replica constructed in 1973
- Interactive map of Fort Normandeau
- Location: Red Deer County, Alberta, Canada
- Built: 1885 (used until 1893)
- Website: www.waskasoopark.ca/historic-fort-normandeau

Fort Normandeau is a historical site marking the birthplace of Red Deer, Alberta. It was occupied by the 65th Battalion, Mount Royal Rifles, in 1885 during the North-West Rebellion. The fort is situated near the Red Deer Crossing along the Red Deer River.

The replica fort sits about 5 kilometres to the west of the city of Red Deer. The original location of the fort was about half a kilometre to the west on the Border Paving property.

== History ==
Originally the river crossing was used by buffalo, deer, elk and other wildlife, later by First Nations that would follow the migrating buffalo, later still the fur traders, and settlers.

The Calgary and Edmonton Railway (C&E) line was originally planned in the early 1890s to go through next to the original fort site. However Leonard Gaetz offered half his land to the C&E to run through what is now downtown Red Deer. Red Deer grew up around the C&E station. As of 2023 the population of Red Deer is approximately 105,000 people.

The crossing was used by North-West Mounted Police until 1893, when it was abandoned.

At some point after its abandonment, the fort was taken down. Fort Normandeau was moved to its current site in 1974.

The City of Red Deer in acquired the fort and the adjacent land in 1983. After performing repairs and building an on-site interpretive centre, the park was officially opened in 1986.
