= Stephan G. Stephansson =

Icelandic poet and farmer (1853–1927)

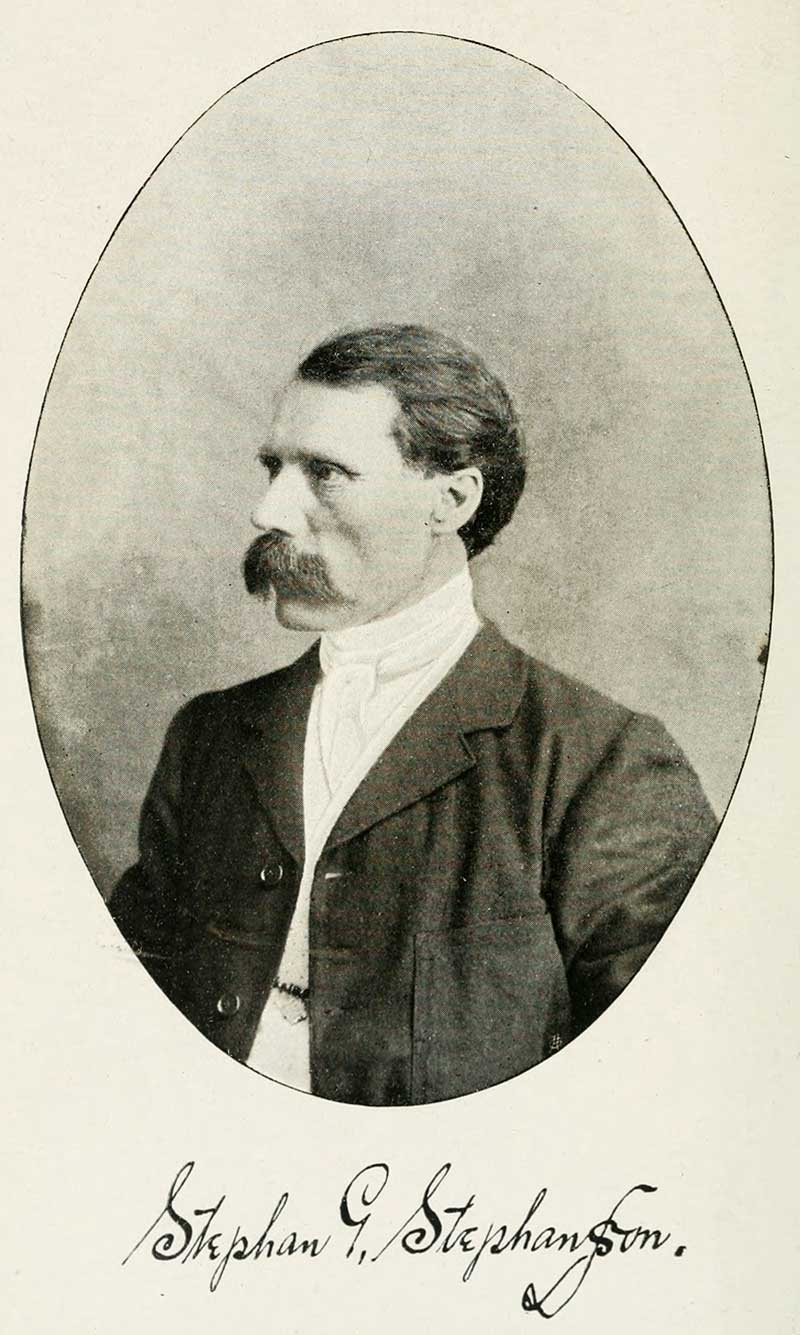
- Born: Stefán Guðmundur Guðmundsson; 3 October 1853; Skagafjörður, Iceland
- Died: 10 August 1927 (aged 73); Markerville, Alberta
- Resting place: Christinsson and Stephansson Cemetery, Markerville, Alberta
- Citizenship: Iceland
- Occupations: Poet, playwright, farmer
- Spouse: Helga Sigríður Jónsdóttir (1878-1927)
- Children: 8
- Writing career
- Period: 1873-1927
- Notable works: Vopnhale (1915); The Trail of War (1920); Andvökur, Vols. 1-5 (1923); Andvökur Vol. 6 (1938, posthumously)

Stephan G. Stephansson (born Stefán Guðmundur Guðmundsson; October 3, 1853 – August 10, 1927), was a Western Icelander, poet, and farmer. Dubbed "the poet of the Rocky Mountains," he is widely acclaimed as “the greatest poet of the western world,” with Canadian literary scholar Watson Kirkconnell naming him as “Canada’s leading poet.” His influence on English poetry is however limited, as he wrote almost exclusively in his native Icelandic.

== Early life and education ==
Stephan G. Stephansson was born on October 3, 1853, on his family’s farm at Kirkjuhóll, in the district of Seyluhreppur in the Skagafjörður region of northern Iceland. His parents, Guðmundur Stefánsson (April 15, 1818 – November 24, 1881) and Guðbjörg Hannesdóttir (July 8, 1930 – January 18, 1911), were tenant farmers.

Stephansson’s upbringing at Kirkjuhóll had great influence on his later life. His father taught him how to farm and care for animals, while his mother also helped cultivate an interest in nature and the natural world, something that would influence much of his poetic works. Schools in rural Iceland were rare, and Stephansson’s parents, themselves self-educated, taught him to read and write. Stephansson's father was also a member of a reading society which provided him with access to wide assortment of reading materials. Apart from his parents, Stephansson received periodic instruction from a local Lutheran minister when he visited the family’s farm.

Financial difficulties led the family to relocate to several times. In 1860, the family relocated to Syðri-Mælifellsá. The move was beneficial for Stephansson, as several farmers hired a local poet, Sigvaldi Jónsson, to teach local children, including Stephansson. At Syðri-Mælifellsá, Stephansson also met Jón Árnason, an Icelandic farmer-poet and his father's landlord, who provided him with access to his home library. This library provided him with access to many poetic works and Danish texts which he used to teach himself Danish.

In 1868 at age 14, Stephansson was confirmed and began working as a fisherman to help support his family. He used his time at sea to compose poetry and verse and perform for his fellow fishermen.

In 1870, Stephansson and his family relocated to the Mýri region where Stephansson's three aunts lived. He found work as a farmhand on a farm at Mjóidalur that was owned by his father’s half-sister Sigurbjorg and her husband Jon Jonsson, the parents of Stephansson’s future wife Helga Sigríður Jónsdóttir.

== Life in North America ==
Although Stephansson and his family found some stability at Mjóidalur, they continued to struggle financially. This was compounded by the eruption of Grímsvötn that lasted from January 1873 until the early spring which stifled agriculture and persuaded many families, including Stephansson’s, to immigrate to the United States.

In 1873, at age 19, Stephansson settled in Wisconsin, United States. In 1889 he moved to Markerville, Red Deer County, Alberta, Canada. He did not see Iceland again until 1917, when he was 64 years old.

Stephan was self-educated and worked hard all his life. He wrote after work, and, being an insomniac, he often wrote till dawn. He was under the influence of the American writer Ralph Waldo Emerson and they shared the same beliefs in many matters, including equal rights for men and women. Stephan wrote only in Icelandic and had great influence in his home country.

His poems were published in a six volume book called "Andvökur" (Wakeful Nights).

His letters and essays were published in four volumes, and even if nothing of his poetry had survived, those would have been enough to single him out as one of Iceland's foremost men of letters.

== Death and legacy ==
On 16 December 1926, Stephansson suffered a severe stroke. Although advised by doctors to be moved to a nearby hospital, Stephansson refused. He struggled greatly with writing, although, with assistance from Helga and his daughter Rósa, he regained the ability to write and continued to produce poetry. Despite this recovery, his health worsened throughout the spring of 1927 and on 9 August 1927, he suffered another stroke, dying in the early morning of 10 August.

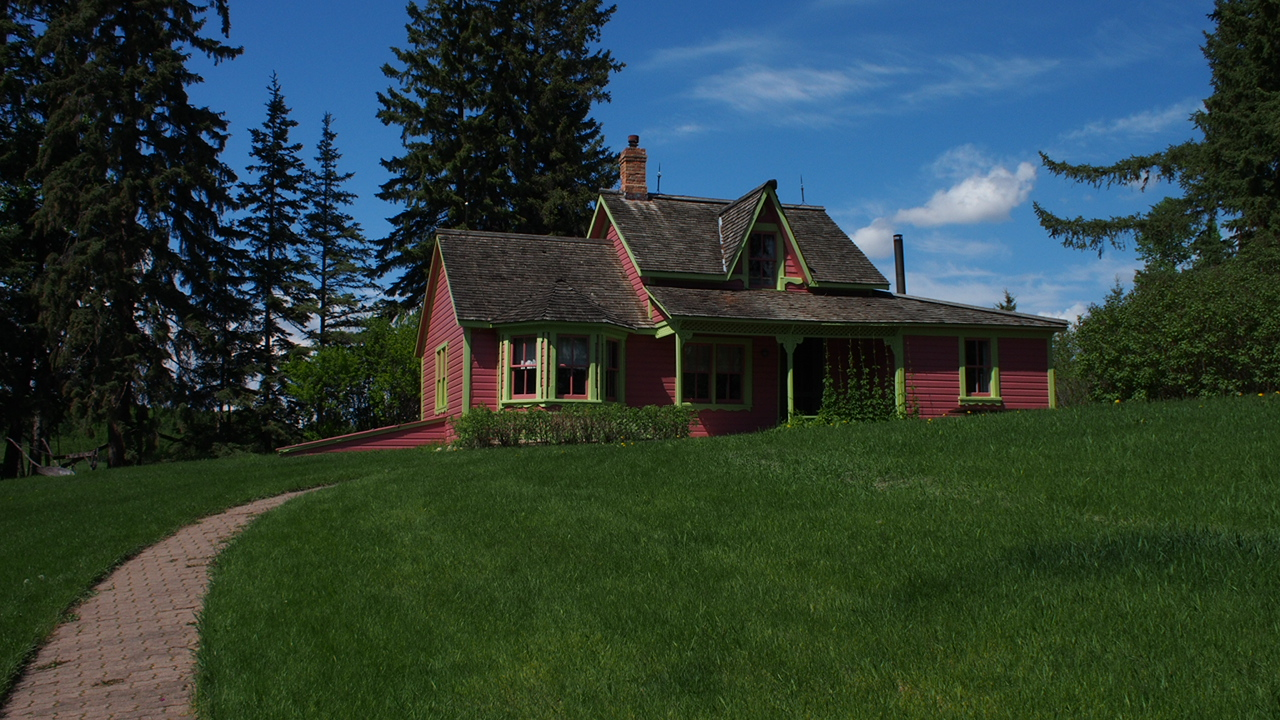
Stephansson House Provincial Historic Site, Markerville, Alberta (2014)

His homestead near Markerville, Stephansson House, is an Alberta Provincial Historic Site. It has been restored to 1927 condition and is open to the public from May 17 until September 1.

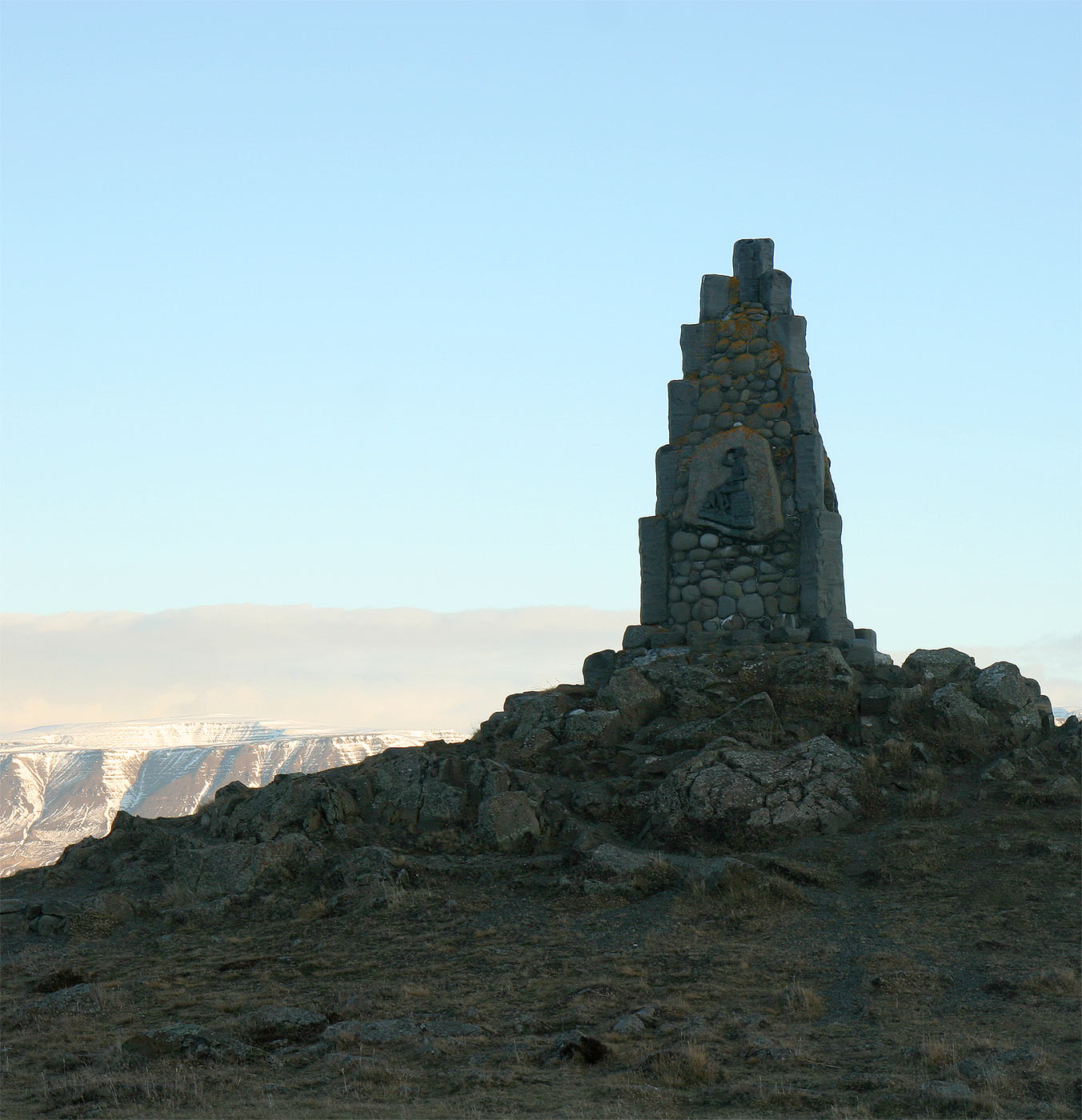
Monument to Stephan Stephansson, Vatnsskarð Pass, Varmahlið, Iceland

Several monuments have been erected in Stephansson's honour. The first was constructed on his grave near Markerville and was unveiled on 19 July 1936. This was followed by a more substantial cenotaph constructed in Markerville in September 1950 by the Historic Sites and Monuments Board of the Government of Alberta in recognition of Stephansson's poetic influence. In 1937, he was described as "the greatest poet of the western world" by literary critic F. Stanton Crawley.

On 10 August 1953, Stephansson's daughter Rosa Siglaug Benediktson and the Government of Iceland opened a monument in Vatnsskarð Pass near Varmahlíð in northern Iceland dedicated to Stephansson. A small monument to Stephansson can also be found at his homestead site near Gardar.

The Stephan G. Stephansson Award for Poetry is named in his honour and awarded annually by the Writers Guild of Alberta.

In 1984 folk artist Richard White released an album of Stephansson's poems that were translated and sung in English, set to original music called Sun Over Darkness Prevail.

== Published Literary Works ==
- Andvökur [Sleepless Nights], Volume 1 (1908), Winnipeg, Manitoba
- Andvökur [Sleepless Nights], Volume 2 (1909), Winnipeg, Manitoba
- Andvökur [Sleepless Nights], Volume 3 (1909), Winnipeg, Manitoba
- Andvökur [Sleepless Nights], Volume 4 (1908), Winnipeg, Manitoba
- Andvökur [Sleepless Nights], Volume 5 (1908), Winnipeg, Manitoba
- Andvökur [Sleepless Nights], Volume 6 (1938 (posthumous)), Winnipeg, Manitoba
- Vígsloða [The Trail of War] (1920), Reykjavík, Iceland

== See also ==
- List of Icelandic writers
- Stephansson House Provincial Historic Site
