= Îethka Îam: Speak Stoney =

Îethka Îam: Speak Stoney. Level 1 Stoney Nakoda Language Textbook
- Language: English, Stoney
- Published: 2021
- Publisher: Stoney Education Authority
- Media type: Letter, perfect-bound
- Pages: vii+99
- ISBN: 9781941458860

Îethka Îam: Speak Stoney is a beginners' textbook for teaching the Stoney Nakoda language. It was one of the first educational resources for formal teaching of Stoney. The book is supported by several online resources and apps.

A second volume followed in 2023, and a third in 2024.

== Origins ==
Initially at the invitation of a teacher in Mînî Thnî in Stoney Nakoda First Nation in 2019, The Language Conservancy, a non-profit USA-based organisation focused on revitalising Indigenous languages, collaborated with Stoney Education Authority to produce the textbook. According to newspaper reporting, "before the partnership began, Stoney language teachers were creating their own resources, and while their cause was noble, they found themselves struggling to teach the language effectively and in a consistent manner". The TLC first created a Stoney dictionary by, over two weeks, crowdsourcing lexical material from around fifty Stoney Nakoda First Nation elders, including people from Chiniki, Wesley and Bearspaw First Nations. The textbook Îethka Îam was then created using one of the TLC's pre-existing templates, with review by Stoney leaders.

Textbooks aimed at higher levels were said to be planned.

== Audience ==
The textbook is primarily intended for kindergarten-to-grade-3 children being taught by Stoney-speakers in schools in the Stoney First Nation, but says that it can also be used by parents teaching Stoney; "in higher grades, especially in cases where students have had little, or no, structured Stoney instruction"; and "by adult self-learners at the beginner level".

The textbook is designed to be implemented using the Total Physical Response method, along with classroom games based on flashcards that teach vocabulary, and teachers using "as much Stoney as possible when interacting with children".

== Contents ==
The book begins with a introduction explaining the pedagogical philosophies that underpin it, and giving advice to would-be teachers (pp. iv–vii). The book contains little explicit instruction on grammar.

Pages 1–64 largely comprise a richly illustrated picture dictionary of Stoney words and phrases (mostly nouns) for use by students, combined with worksheet activities to help students absorb the vocabulary. These are divided into twenty-four units on themes such as "âba wathtech/good day" ("greetings; introductions; self-identifications"; unit 1, p. 2), "îhnuthe/clothes" ("basic clothing terms; verb – to wear and – I have; review of plural forms of colours"; unit 7, pp. 18–20), and "rheyam wagichibi/pow wow" ("vocabulary associated with pow-wow and pow-wow activities; review of kinship terms; review of kinship terms, traditional clothes, colours and sizes"; unit 20, pp. 52–53). English is sometimes used to give instructions on worksheets, but most instructions and all vocabulary are given only in Stoney.

Pages 65–68 suggest classroom activities, almost all based on using flashcards, that can help students engage with the different units.

Pages 69–70 are a guide to Stoney orthography and pronunciation.

Pages 71–89, entitled "for teachers and parents", provide a detailed lesson-plan for almost all the units of the book, including English glosses of many of the Stoney words and phrases.

Pages 90–96 are a Stoney–English glossary of all the vocabulary in the book.

Pages 97–98 provide a Stoney–English list of instructions and other useful phrases for teachers to use in the classroom, such as "sit down" (yodâga) and "you did well" (dââ echanûch), giving Stoney words and phrases in both singular and plural forms.
