= Iron Confederacy =

Former alliance of Plains Indians

- Nēhiyaw-Pwat ᓀᐦᐃᔭᐤ ᐸᐧᐟ
- Formation: Unknown, before 1692
- Type: Confederation
- Members: Assiniboine; Plains Cree; Métis; Saulteaux; Stoney
- Official language: Assiniboine; Plains Cree; Michif; Western or Plains Ojibwa; Stoney

The Iron Confederacy or Iron Confederation (also known as Cree-Assiniboine in English or Nehiyaw-Pwat in Cree) was a political and military alliance of Plains Indians of what is now Western Canada and the northern United States. This confederacy included various individual bands that formed political, hunting and military alliances in defense against common enemies. The ethnic groups that made up the Confederacy were the branches of the Cree that moved onto the Great Plains around 1740 (the southern half of this movement eventually became the "Plains Cree" and the northern half the "Woods Cree"), the Saulteaux (Plains Ojibwa), the Nakoda or Stoney people also called Pwat or Assiniboine, and the Métis and Haudenosaunee (who had come west with the fur trade). The Confederacy rose to predominance on the northern Plains during the height of the North American fur trade when they operated as middlemen controlling the flow of European goods, particularly guns and ammunition, to other Indigenous nations (the "Indian Trade"), and the flow of furs to the Hudson's Bay Company (HBC) and North West Company (NWC) trading posts. Its peoples would take part in the bison (buffalo) hunt, and the pemmican trade. The decline of the fur trade and the collapse of the bison herds sapped the power of the Confederacy after the 1860s.

== Origins ==
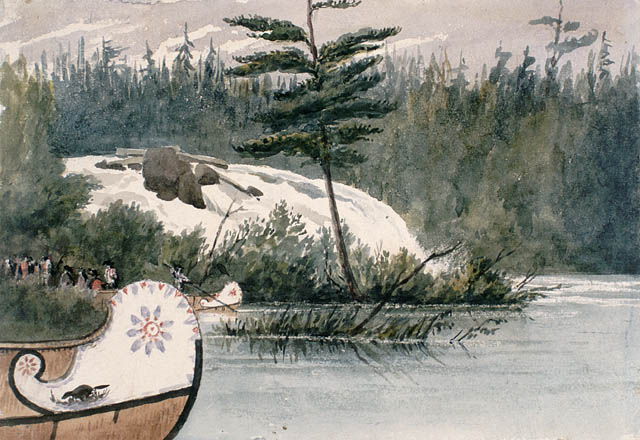
Canoes of the Hudson's Bay Company

The Assiniboine are believed to have originated on the southern edge of the Laurentian Shield in present-day Minnesota. They became a separate people from their closest linguistic cousins, the Yanktonai Dakota, sometime prior to 1640 when they are first mentioned by Europeans in the Jesuit Relation. They were not a member of the "Seven Fires Council" of the Great Sioux Nation by this time and were referred to by other Sioux speakers as the Hohe or "rebels". By 1806, the historical evidence definitively locates them in the Assiniboine River valley in present-day Saskatchewan and Manitoba.

The Cree had been in contact with Europeans since around 1611 when Henry Hudson reached their ancestral homeland around Hudson and James Bays. The traditional view of historians, based on the accounts of European traders, is that once the Hudson's Bay Company (HBC) began to establish itself in the Hudson Bay region, two branches of the Cree began moving west and south to act as middlemen traders. They denied other plains peoples access to the HBC, except for the Assiniboine, in exchange for peaceful relations. A more recent view, based on oral history and linguistic evidence, suggests that the Cree were already established west of Lake Winnipeg when the HBC arrived, and were likely present as far west as the Peace River Region of present-day Alberta.

When the Hudson's Bay Company opened its first bayside posts in 1668 and 1688, the Cree became their main customers and resellers. Prior to this the Cree had been at the northwestern edge of a trade system linked to the French, from which they received only the secondhand goods others were ready to discard. Once in possession of direct access to European tools and weapons, the Cree were able to expand rapidly West.

The earliest written record of the military and political relations of the nations west of Hudson's Bay comes from Henry Kelsey's journal c. 1690–1692. In it, he states that the Cree and the Assiniboine had good relations with the Blackfoot and were already allies against the "Eagle Birch Indians, Mountain Poets, and Nayanwattame Poets" (the identities of these groups are uncertain but they may have been other Siouan-speakers, or Gros Ventres).

The history of the Stoney before the mid-eighteenth century are obscure. They speak a Siouan language they call nakoda, which is little different from Assiniboine. The present-day Stoney Nation of Alberta believes that Kelsey's mention of the "Mountain Poets" may refer to their ancestors. However, the consensus view is that they were not yet a separate people from the Assiniboine. There is clear evidence of them as a separate group from 1754–1755 when Anthony Henday wrote of camping with "Stone" families near present-day Red Deer, Alberta. The Stoney were already trading with the Cree fur traders at this point and were military allies.

== Early expansion and the fur trade ==
American ethnographer and historian Edward S. Curtis wrote about the close but unstable relationship between the Assiniboine and the Plains Cree, and how, after the Plains and Woods Cree territories diverged, the Woods Cree were no longer a part of this military alliance:

The neighbors of the western Cree were Athapascans on the north and northwest, Blackfeet on the west, and Assiniboine on the south. With the Assiniboine they were closely associated from the time of the separation of that tribe from the parent Sioux prior to the opening of the country by exploration in the early years of the seventeenth century; nevertheless, there were rather frequent drunken brawls, with consequent murders, between the two tribes in the boisterous era of the fur-trade. They joined forces in pushing the Blackfeet, Bloods, and Piegan southwestward out of the plains bordering Saskatchewan river, and up to the termination of inter-tribal warfare remained constant enemies of these other Algonquians. The Cree inheritance of the historic Sioux hostility toward the Chippewa was not lessened by the friendly reception they accorded the renegade Assiniboine, for whom the Sioux entertained bitter hatred mixed with professed contempt. The Woods Cree had little, if any, part in this warfare with the Blackfeet and the Sioux; their operations were limited to dispossessing the Athapascans of their territory between the Saskatchewan and Athabasca lake. Peace river, according to Henry, received its name from the circumstance that the Cree and the Beavers settled their hostilities at Peace point.

— The North American Indian, Volume 18 (1907)

During this early period the north front of expansion is better documented. By the early 1700s the Cree had come into conflict with the Chipewyan to their northwest. With the help of a Chipewyan interpreter, Thanadelthur (a woman who had learned the Cree language as a captive), the HBC was able to help broker a peace between the Cree and Chipewyan in 1715. By 1760, the western front of Cree expansion reached the Lesser Slave Lake region of what is now northern Alberta where the Cree eventually pushed out the Beaver (Danezaa) people. The Cree-Beaver conflicts lasted until the smallpox epidemic in 1781 decimated the Cree in the region, leading to a peace treaty ratified by a pipe ceremony at Peace Point, which gave its name to the Peace River. The river became the boundary with the Beavers on the left bank (to the north and west) and the Cree on the right bank (the south and east).

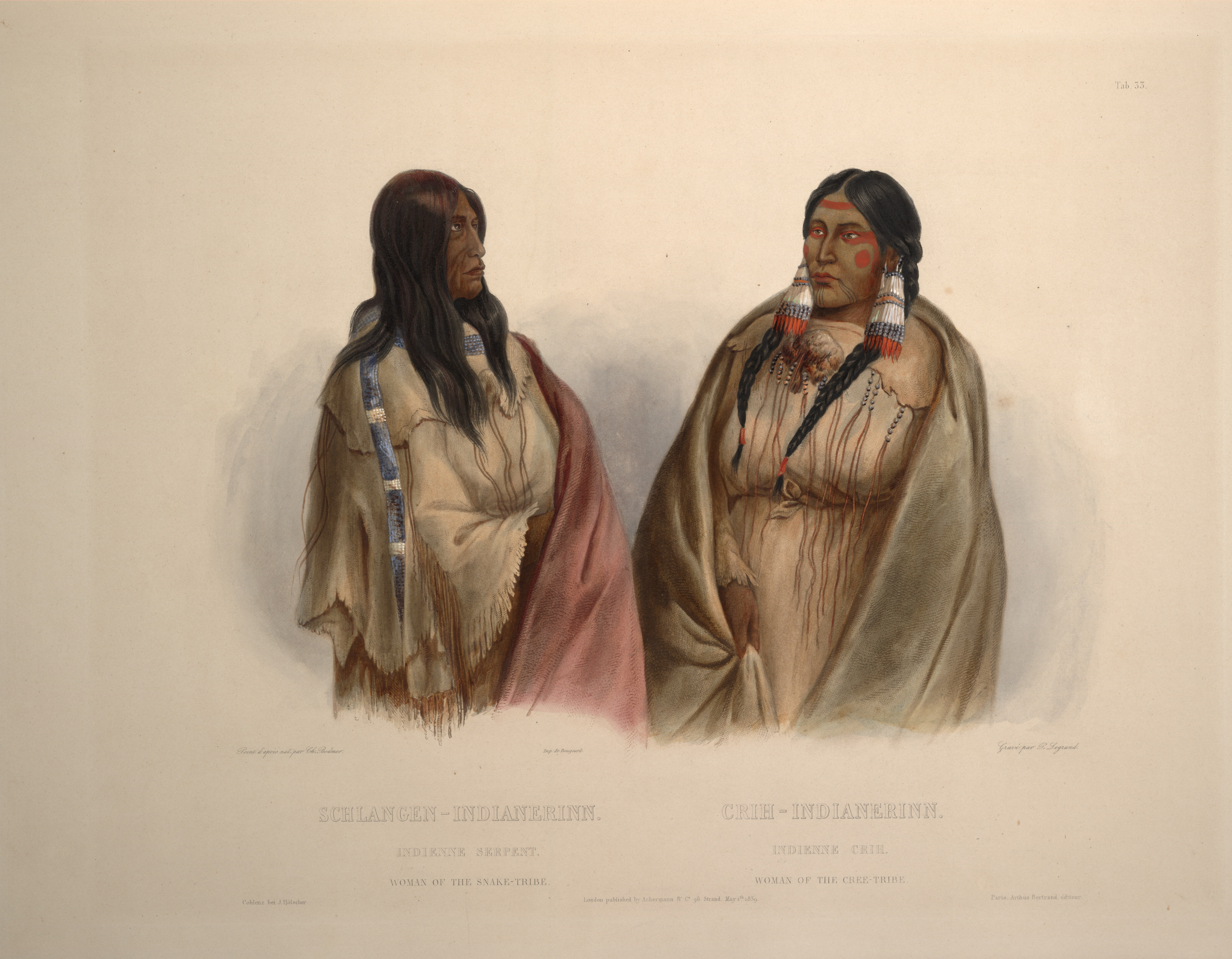
Shoshoni (left) and Cree women, 1840s

In the south little political or economic history is recorded for several decades. Recounting his story to David Thompson many years later, a Cree man named Saukamappee told of a band of Cree aiding the Piegan (Blackfoot) in their conflict with the Snake near the Eagle Hills around 1723. The battle was fought on foot with bows-and-arrows tipped with obsidian, and neither guns nor horses were involved at this point. By 1732 the Snakes had horses, which they were using to great effect against the Piegan, and so the Piegan called upon the Cree and Assiniboine for assistance. This time, however, Sukamappee says that Cree and Assiniboine muskets turned the battle in their favour. By 1750, Legardeur de Saint Pierre noted that the Cree and Assiniboine were successfully raiding the "Hyactljlini" "Brochets" and "Gros Ventres", and despite his peacemaking efforts the Assiniboine massacred a group of the "Hyactljlini" (whose identity is unknown).

In 1754 Henday reported that he was able to buy a horse from the Assiniboine camped near present-day Battleford, Saskatchewan, and was the first European witness to Cree-Assiniboine trade with the "Archithinue" (Blackfoot Confederacy). From this and later accounts, the content of the trade is well known: the Cree and Assiniboine gave European goods including guns, knives, kettles, hatchets, and gunpowder to the Blackfoot people in exchange for horses, buffalo-skin robes, and wolf, beaver, and fox furs, which they would take to York Factory (the Blackfoot people refused HBC proposals that they go to the Bay directly, as it was too far and, as a plains people, they were not experienced canoeists). A gun was worth roughly fifty beavers, and a horse was worth one gun according to Henday. In 1772, Mathew Cocking reported that the Cree and Assiniboine with whom he travelled were always alarmed when they saw an unknown horse, fearing that they might belong to the Snakes. Cocking also suggests that at this time the Cree-Assiniboine held an annual gathering with the Blackfoot in March near Saskatchewan River Forks where they would trade and the Blackfoot would ask for volunteers for their wars with the Snakes.

== Transition to Plains Culture ==
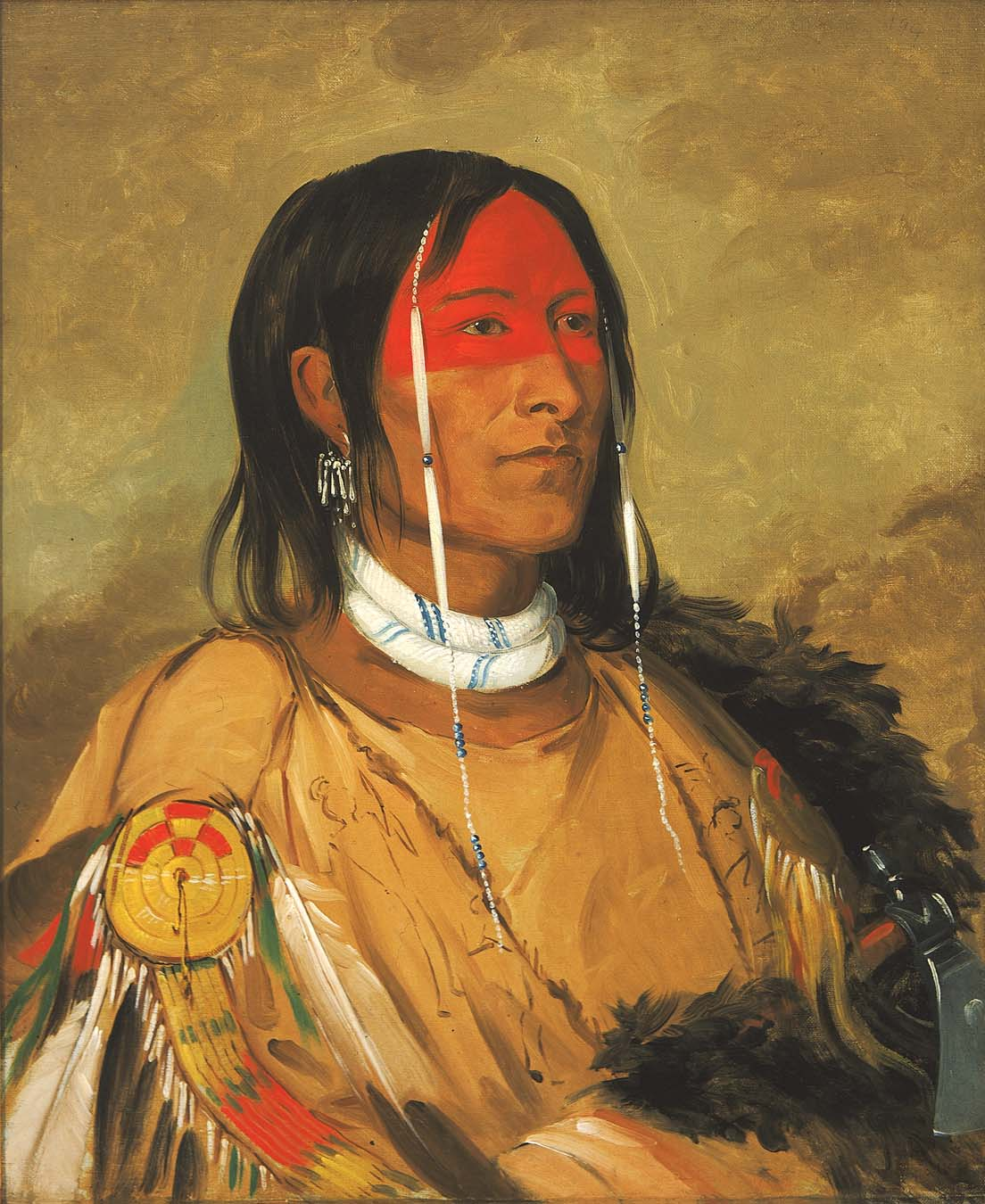
Portrait of Eeh-tow-wées-ka-zeet (He Who Has Eyes Behind Him) a Plains Cree warrior painted by George Catlin

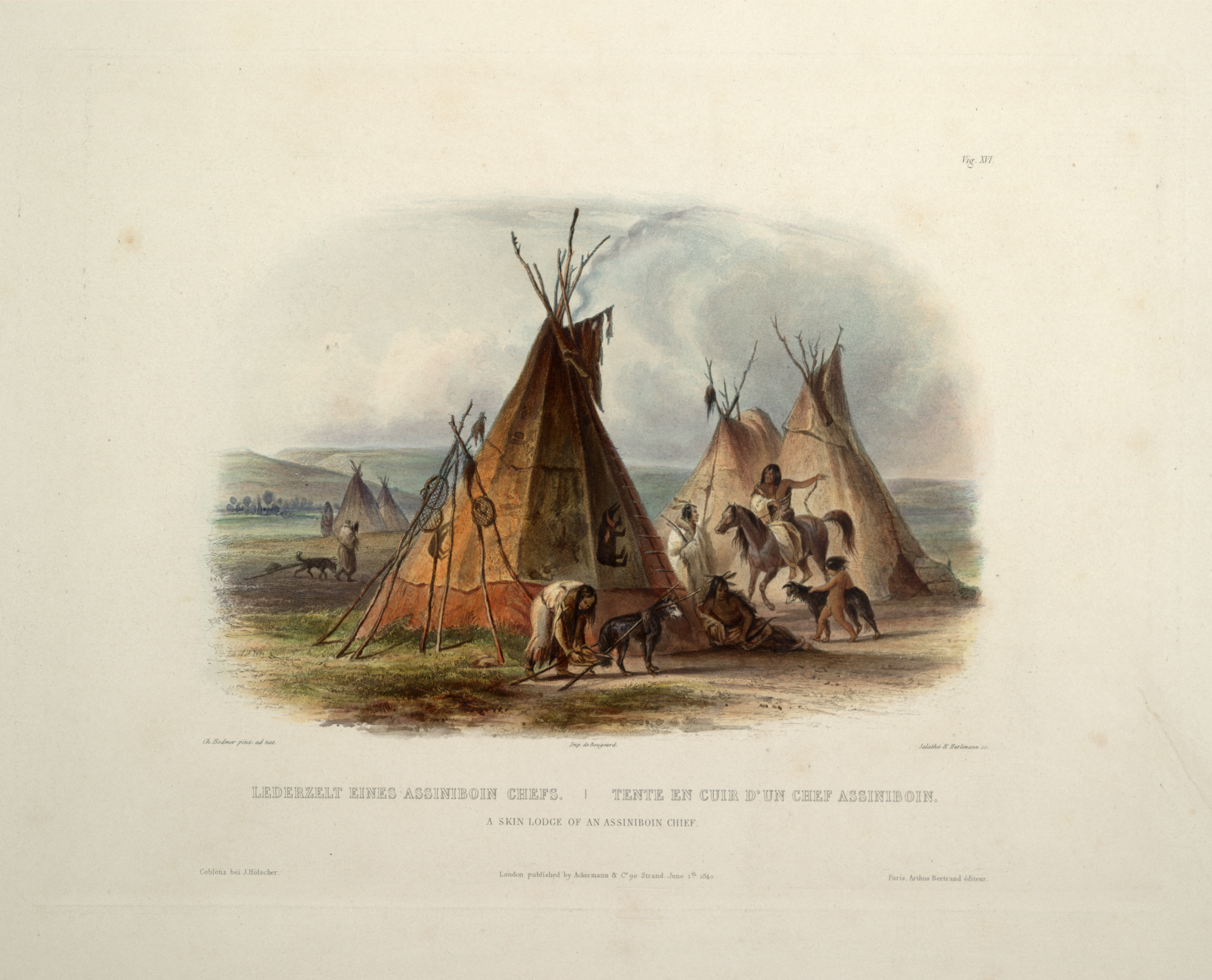
A print of a Karl Bodmer painting published in London, UK in 1840. It shows an Assiniboine camp with teepees, travois, and horses

As the HBC and NWC moved inland to the West, the Confederacy also moved inland and west so that they would not lose their control of the trade. As the HBC and NWC moved northwards and inland after 1760, the Crees were no longer required as intermediaries to ferry furs from place to another, but they gained new opportunities in the supply of pemmican (dried bison meat) and other provisions that European fur traders needed when travelling to the companies' new posts in the subarctic. Some Cree, historically a woodland people, adopted the ways of the plains people, including nomadic bison hunting and horsemanship. These emerging Plains Cree were initially allies of the Blackfoot, helping them to drive the Kootenay and Snakes across the Rocky Mountains. At the same time, many Assiniboine people moved farther west, eventually spawning the Nakoda (Stoney) people, who were a separate group by about 1744.

The Confederacy fought a series of wars over the control of the trade in major commodities on the plains. Before 1790, the Cree relied on the Mandan as a source of horses, for their own use and to trade to the isolated European fur trade posts. They were allies of the Blackfoot and Mandan against the Sioux in the great horse wars of this period. The Cree made significant profits from the trade with the Blackfoot; one HBC journal entry notes that a Cree trader bought a musket from the HBC for 14 prime beaver pelts and sold it to a Blackfoot warrior for 50 prime beaver pelts. From the Mandan they also received beans, maize, and tobacco, in exchange for European goods.

By the mid-19th century, the Confederacy had lost control of the trade with the Mandan. From 1790 to 1810, intermittent wars were fought between the Confederacy and its former horse suppliers to the south. As the Confederacy reached out to the Arapaho as a potential new source of horses, they were blocked by the Gros Ventres. In 1790, the Gros Ventres joined the Blackfoot Confederacy, making the Iron Confederacy and the Blackfoot enemies for the first time. In response, the Plains Cree allied with the "Flathead" (Salish) Indians as a new source of horses. In the 1810s, Peter Fidler described the Cree and Sacree peacefully sharing the Beaver Hills, but he also records that a new geographical place name had been added to the region, the Battle River, which had not been mentioned by this name before, was so-called to commemorate a battle between the Cree and Blackfoot, who would go on to be long-term rivals. By the 1830s, the mixed buffalo-hunting parties of Crees, Assiniboine, and Métis reached what is now northern Montana, and the United States government gave the Crees some limited recognition when U.S. officials invited the Cree leader "Broken Arm" (Maskepetoon) as one of the representatives of tribes living near Fort Union to meet President Andrew Jackson in Washington D.C.

Histories of this later period do not clearly state which bands are being referred to when it is said that "the Cree" were in a particular place. Neal McLeod makes clear that these bands were loose, temporary groupings that were often multiethnic and multilingual, so that most mentions of "the Cree" by historians of previous decades actually refers to mixed Cree-Assiniboine-Saulteax groups. Further, the whooping cough outbreak of 1819–1820 and the smallpox outbreak of 1780–1781 decimated many bands, forcing them to merge with neighbours.

In 1846, travelling artist Paul Kane identified a man he met at Fort Pitt, Kee-a-kee-ka-sa-coo-way, as "head chief" of the Cree, though it is doubtful that any such title existed. Kane mentions a man named Mukeetoo as his associate, but historians believe this person to be Black Powder, who was Plains Ojibwa rather than Cree. This may indicate how intertwined the two peoples were at this time.

By the 1850s, two bands, the "Cree-Assiniboine" or (also called the "Cree-speaking Assiniboine" or the "Young Dogs"), and the Qu'Appelle were established in the region between Wood Mountain and the Cypress Hills and traded on both sides of the international border.

From around 1800 to 1850, the Iron Confederacy was at its apogee, controlling the trade with HBC posts such as Fort Pitt and Fort Edmonton. Their southern expansion peaked in the 1860s when the Plains Cree controlled most of present-day southern Saskatchewan and east-central Alberta with the Assiniboine also moving south.

== Decline ==
The rapid decline of the bison economically and socially weakened all plains peoples, including the members of the Iron Confederacy. Original range of American bison Range as of 1870 Range as of 1889 Dark numbers indicate number of bison as of January 1, 1889, in remaining areas. Light numbers give date of local extermination.

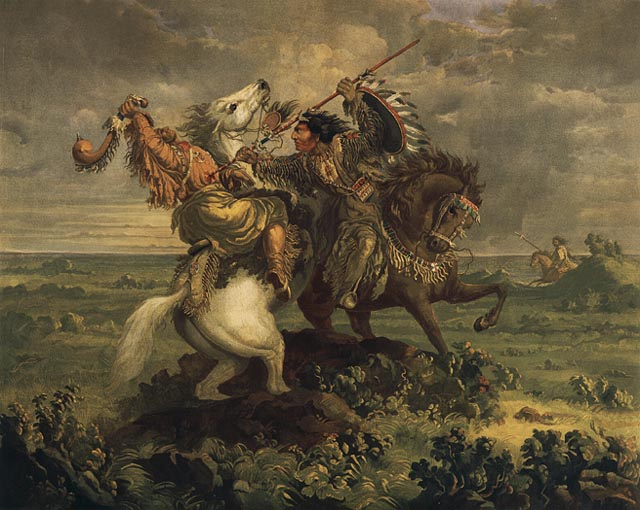
The Death of Omoxesisixany or Big Snake by Paul Kane depicting a battle between a Blackfoot and Plains Cree warrior on horseback.

From around 1850, the decline of the bison herds began to weaken the Iron Confederacy. The bison migrated seasonally, creating the potential for conflict over the right to harvest them.

The great western herds winter between the south and the north branches of the Saskatchewan, south of the Touchwood Hills, and beyond the north Saskatchewan in the valley of the Athabasca; They cross the South Branch in June or July, visit the prairies on the south side of the Touchwood Hill range, and cross the Qu'appelle valley anywhere between the Elbow of the South Branch and a few miles west of Fort Ellice on the Assiniboine. They then strike for the Grand Coteau de Missouri, and their eastern flank often approaches the Red River herds coming north from the Grand Coteau. They then proceed across the Missouri up the Yellow Stone, and return to the Saskatchewan and Athabaska as winter approaches, by the flanks of the Rocky Mountains.

— Henry Youle Hind, 1860

This meant that many Plains peoples would often rely on the same herd; overhunting by one party (or European settlers) affected them all in a tragedy of the commons. The bison would frequently move across tribal boundaries, and desperate hunters would be tempted to follow, leading to frequent disputes. The bison declined sooner in the parkland belt where the Cree lived then on the shortgrass prairies to the south. The Cree blamed the HBC and Métis for this, but still needed them for trade. Bison could still be found on Blackfoot territories, forcing Cree hunting bands to stray into Blackfoot territory, leading to conflict. During these buffalo wars, alliances shifted once again, however the Iron Confederacy was never able to regain (permanent) access to the bison herds.

An oral tradition tells of a 1867 peace treaty between the Cree and the Blackfoot made at the site of what would become Wetaskiwin, Alberta. This peace would not have held long because around 1870 the Gros Ventre, formerly part of the Blackfoot Confederacy for some 90 years, defected and became allies of the Assiniboine. The Plains Cree engaged in one last battle against the Blackfoot, the Battle of the Belly River on October 25, 1870, near present-day Lethbridge, Alberta, but lost at least 200 warriors. Following this, in 1873, Blackfoot leader Crowfoot ceremonially adopted Poundmaker of mixed Cree and Assiniboine parentage, creating a final peace between the Cree and Blackfoot.

In 1869 the Canadian government bought the HBC's claim to what is now western Canada. The Métis objected to not having been consulted and negotiated the Manitoba Act. The Métis were not able to rally the Cree or Assiniboine to their cause, and the Wolseley expedition instead put down the Red River Resistance with military force during the annual buffalo hunt rather than overseeing the implementation of the Manitoba Act as had been negotiated.

The decline of the buffalo had become a subsistence crisis for the member bands of the Confederacy by the 1870s which led them to seek help from the Canadian government. The Canadian government was only willing to give this in exchange for treaties which they believed would extinguish their aboriginal title. The Confederacy was always a loose grouping, and when the Canadian government negotiated treaties in the region in the 1870s, the agreements were made with groups of bands, not with any central leadership. Each band, consisting of a few dozen or at most a few hundred people nominated its own leader to sign treaties on the group's behalf. Member bands of the Confederacy were signatories to Treaty 1 (1871, southern Manitoba), Treaty 4 (signings 1874–1877, now southern Saskatchewan), Treaty 5 (signings 1875–1879 plus later additions, now northern Manitoba), and Treaty 6 (signings 1876–1879, many later additions, now central Saskatchewan and Alberta). Notably, these were negotiated separately from Treaty 7 (1877) with the Blackfoot Confederacy, showing that the Canadian government recognized the differences between the two groups. Under the terms of these treaties, the member bands of the Iron Confederacy accepted the presence of Canadian settlers on their lands in exchange for emergency and ongoing aid to deal with the starvation being experienced by the plains people due to the disappearance of the bison herds. Not all bands were equally reconciled to the ideas of the treaties. Piapot's band signed into a treaty but refused to choose a site for a reserve, preferring to remain nomadic. The "Battle River Crees" under the leadership of Big Bear and Little Pine refused to sign altogether.

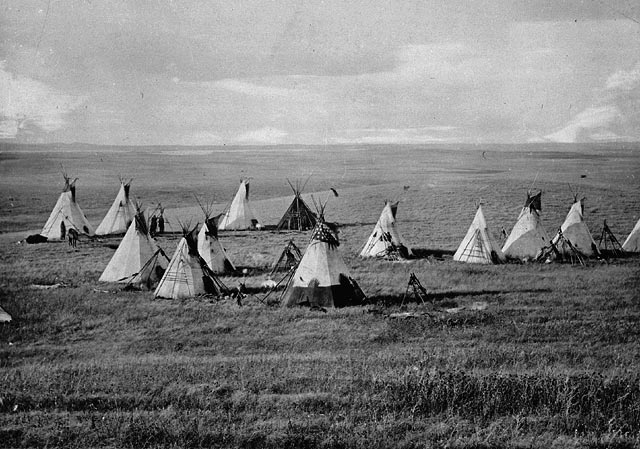
Cree camp in central Alberta, 1871

By 1878 the buffalo crisis was now critical and despite the treaties, little material support was given by the Canadian government, forcing increasing numbers of both treaty and non-treaty bands from Canadian territory to hunt in Montana. In 1879 or 1880 the last remaining buffalo disappeared from Canadian territory, after this time many Cree and Assiniboine bands moved south, making frequent hunting trips into American-claimed territory, or even camping there year-round.

This was seen as a threat by white settlers in Montana in light of Sitting Bull leading his Sioux into Canada in 1876 to escape the American military: it was feared that Indian groups from either side could attack Americans and then use Canada as a safe haven. In response the United States began to militarize its frontier in the region, constructing Fort Assinniboine near the Bears Paw Mountains [sic] in 1879 and Fort Maginnis in the Judith Basin in 1880. In that same year a Canadian report estimated seven to eight thousand "British Indians" were hunting in Montana, including three of the most famous Aboriginal leaders in Western Canadian history who were encamped together: a Cree band under Big Bear, the Blackfoot under Crowfoot, and a group of Metis hunters including Louis Riel. Governmental opinion in both Canada and the US quickly turned against the previous policy of allowing the free movement of native people across the frontier. Authorities in both countries wanted natives to "civilize", by ending their nomadic hunting traditions, and take up agriculture on reserves, thereby opening the land up for white ranchers and farmers. Both countries wanted to symbolically enforce their control of the land and its native inhabitants. Cree and Metis parties continued to hunt in Montana until late 1881 when the US Army began to arrest and deport them, effectively cutting them off from one of the last remaining bison populations and ensuring their dependence on government-supplied rations.

== Defeat ==
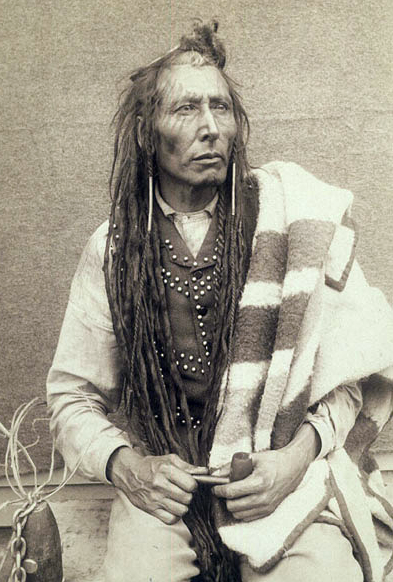
Poundmaker, or Pitikwahanapiwiyin, 1885

In 1885, the Métis were soliciting aid in the lead-up to the 1885 North-West Rebellion. Many Cree and Assiniboine were dissatisfied with their situation, believing that the Canadian government was not living up to its treaty obligations, but it was not a straightforward decision to take up arms. Different leaders of First Nations people held different positions on the usefulness of rebellion. Notable war leaders of the era, such as Big Bear and Poundmaker, led their people to battle, albeit reluctantly; Wandering Spirit was very militant; others kept their people out of the conflict. This was one of few instances of armed conflict between the Canadian government (post-1867) and First Nations peoples.

Following the involvement of the Cree-Assiniboine alliance in the 1885 Battle of Cut Knife, Canada used the new railway and telegraph connections to deploy Ontario and Quebec militias to the West, where they applied superior numbers, mobility, and firepower against the loose alliance of Cree, Assiniboine, and Métis. The Métis were defeated at Batoche, leaving the Cree-Assiniboine without allies. Poundmaker's mixed Cree-Assiniboine war party surrendered. Three weeks later, Big Bear's band won a victory at Frenchman's Butte, but this was in vain. The last band holding out (Big Bear and Wandering Spirit's) was dispersed at Loon Lake on 3 June 1885. After the rebellion Big Bear and Poundmaker were briefly imprisoned; Wandering Spirit and six other natives were hanged. A few members of Big Bear's band and other Cree sought refuge in the United States. They were extradited back to Canada, but most soon returned to the US and settled on the Rocky Boy Indian Reservation, where their descendants live to this day. Big Bear's son eventually returned to Canada and helped found a reservation at Hobbema.

The decline of the buffalo, the treaties it signed with the Queen, and its fighters' defeat in the First Nations portion of the North-West Rebellion heralded, and contributed, to the Iron Confederacy's growing impotence as an economic, social and sovereign unit.

== Sources ==
- Milloy, John S. (1988). The Plains Cree: Trade, Diplomacy, And War, 1780 to 1870. Manitoba Studies in Native History Series. Vol. 4. University of Manitoba Press. ISBN 9780887556234.
