= Indigenous languages of Montana =

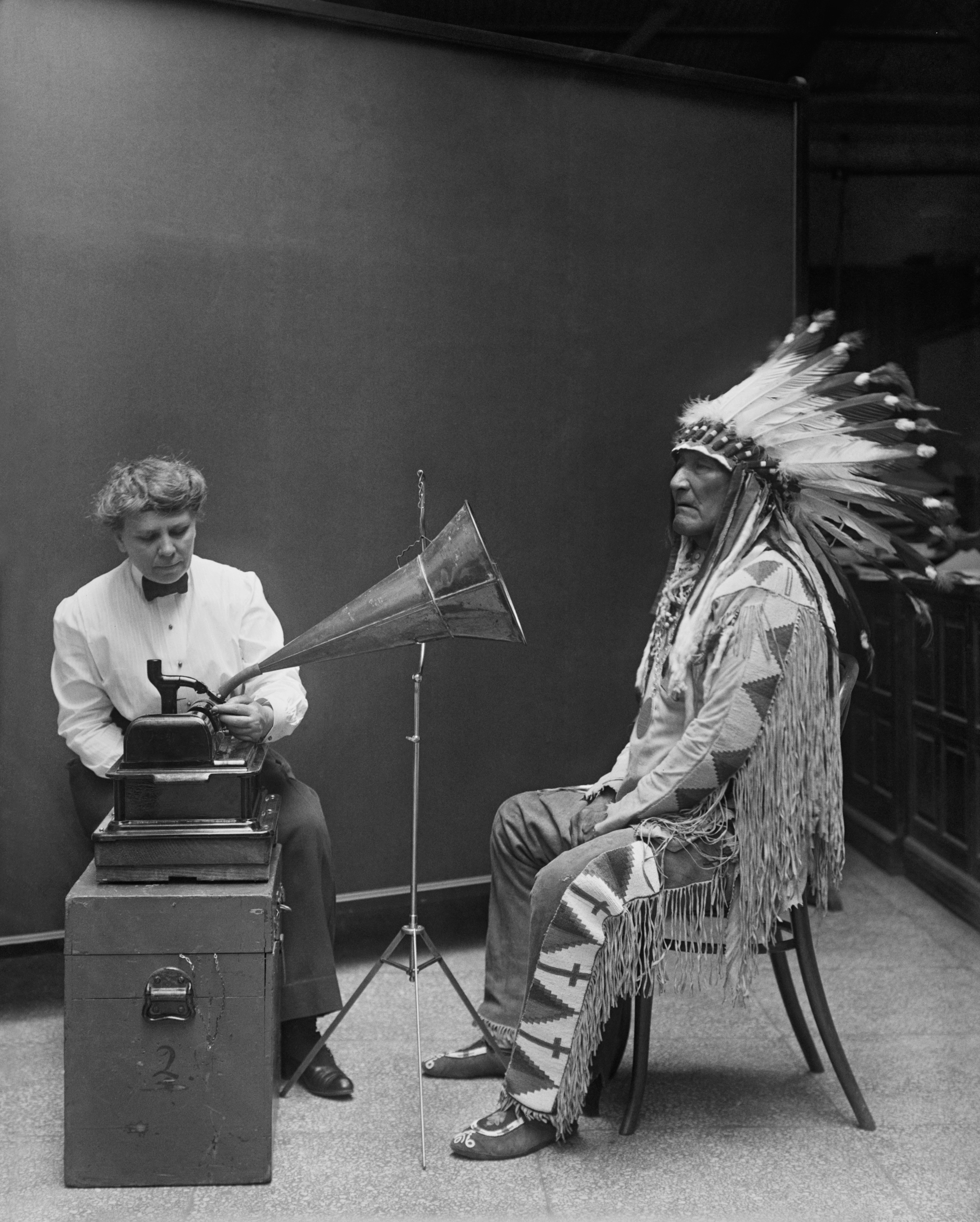
Frances Densmore recording Blackfoot leader Mountain Chief

Montana, the fourth-largest state in the United States by area, is home to more than 100,000 Native Americans, seven Indian reservations, and eight federally recognized tribes. Of all Native Americans in Montana, which make up 9.3% of the state's population, 62.85% live on one of the seven reservations. Native Americans are recognized by the state as a vital part of Montana's economy. Montana, as well as reservations and tribes, is home to a total of eleven native languages.

== List of languages ==
Language	Also known as	Number of native speakers	Areas language is spoken in besides Montana	Endangerment category
Assiniboine	Assiniboin, Hohe, Nakota, Nakoda, Nakon, Nakona, Stoney	150	Saskatchewan	CR (Critically Endangered)
Blackfoot	Siksiká	2,900	Alberta	DE (Definitely Endangered)
Cheyenne	Tsėhesenėstsestȯtse	380	Oklahoma	DE (Definitely Endangered)
Crow	Apsáalooke	4,160	N/A	DE (Definitely Endangered)
Gros Ventre	Atsina, Aaniiih, Ananin, Ahahnelin, Ahe, A’ani, ʔɔʔɔɔɔniiih	0	N/A	CR (Critically Endangered)
Kutenai	Kootenai, Kootenay, Ktunaxa, Ksanka	345	British Columbia, Idaho	SE (Severely Endangered)
Lakota	Lakhota, Teton, Teton Sioux, Lakȟótiyapi	2,100	North Dakota, South Dakota, Nebraska, Minnesota	DE (Definitely Endangered)
Salish–Spokane–Kalispel	Séliš language, Kalispel–Pend d'oreille, Kalispel–Spokane–Flathead, Montana Salish, Séliš, Npoqínišcn	70	Idaho, Washington	CR (Critically Endangered)
Ojibwe	Ojibwa, Ojibway, Otchipwe, Ojibwemowin, Anishinaabemowin	50,000	Quebec, Ontario, Manitoba, Saskatchewan, Michigan, Minnesota, North Dakota	SE (Severely Endangered)
Plains Cree	Nēhiyawēwin	3,200	Manitoba, Saskatchewan, Alberta	VU (Vulnerable)
Stoney	Nakota, Nakoda, Isga, Alberta Assiniboine (formerly)	3,025	Western Canada	VU (Vulnerable)

== Gros Ventre ==
The Gros Ventre language, despite having zero alive native speakers since 2007, is not considered extinct. The language is trying to be revitalized and currently has 45 self-identified speakers.
