= Assiniboine language =

Dakotan language spoken in North America

Assiniboine
- Assiniboin, Hohe, Nakota, Nakoda, Nakon, Nakona, Stoney
- Nakʰóda
- Native to: Canada, United States
- Region: Saskatchewan, Canada; Montana, United States
- Ethnicity: 3,500 Assiniboine (2007)
- Native speakers: 150, 4.3% of ethnic population (2007)
- Language family: Siouan-Catawban: Siouan; Mississippi Valley Siouan; Dakotan; Nakoda; Assiniboine

Language codes
- ISO 639-3: asb
- Glottolog: assi1247
- ELP: Assiniboine
- Assiniboine is classified as Critically Endangered by the UNESCO Atlas of the World's Languages in Danger.

Nakota / Nakoda / Nakona "ally / friend"
- Person: Nakóda
- People: Nakón Oyáde
- Language: Nakón I’ábi; Nakón Wíyutabi
- Country: Nakón Mąkóce

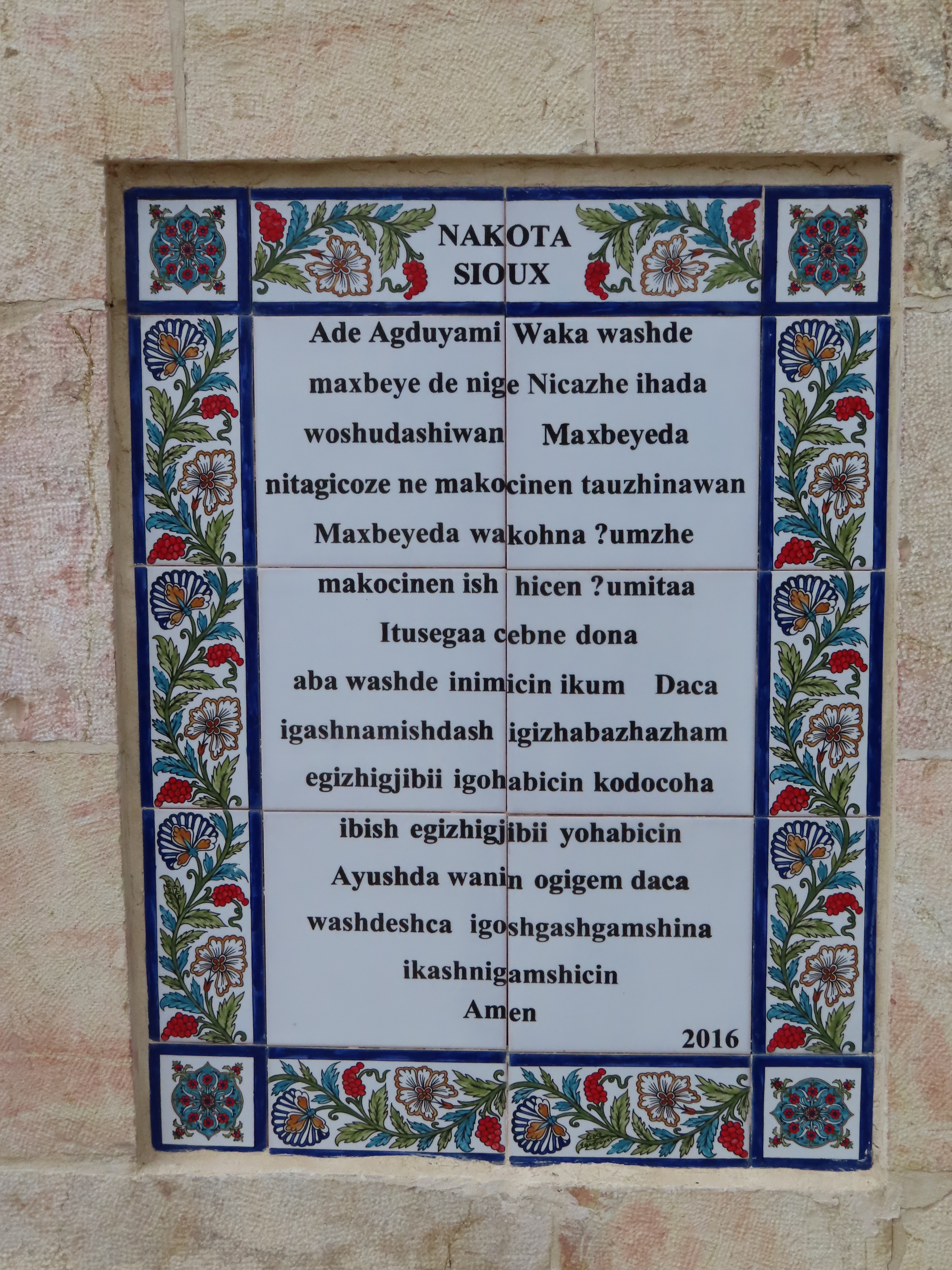
The Lord's Prayer in Nakota Sioux, Church of the Pater Noster

Assiniboine (/əˈsɪnəbɔɪn/; also known as Assiniboin, Hohe, or Nakota, Nakoda, Nakon or Nakona, or Stoney) is a Nakotan language of the Northern Plains. The name Assiniboine comes from the term Asiniibwaan, from Ojibwe, meaning 'Stone Sioux'. They were called this because the Assiniboine people used heated stones to boil their food. In Canada, they are known as 'Stoney Indians', while they call themselves Nakoda, from the term Nakota 'allies'.

== Classification ==
The Dakotan group has five main divisions: Dakota (Santee-Sisseton), Dakota (Yankton-Yanktonai), Lakota (Teton), Nakoda (Assiniboine) and Nakoda (Stoney). Along with the closely-related Stoney, Assiniboine is an n variety of the Dakotan languages, meaning its autonym is pronounced with an initial n (thus: Nakʰóta as opposed to Dakʰóta or Lakʰóta, and Nakʰóda or Nakʰóna as opposed to Dakʰód or Lakʰól). The Assiniboine language is also closely related to the Sioux language and to the Stoney language (likewise called Nakoda or Nakota), although they are hardly mutually intelligible.

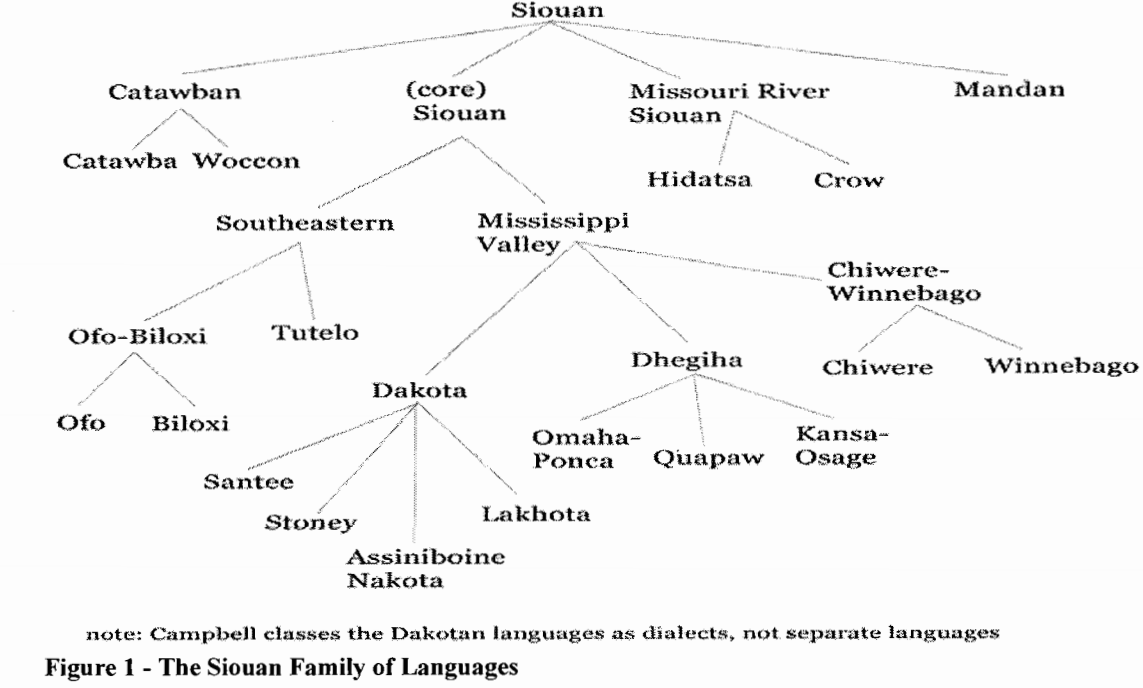
The Siouan-Catawban language family.

=== D-N-L classification system ===
The Assiniboine language (Nakota), the Dakota language, and the Lakota language are usually classified in the D-N-L subgroup. As suggested by the name of the system, the variation in pronunciations of certain words follows the D-N-L rule. A typical example is given below:

Language group	'greasy'
Santee-Sisseton	sda
Yankton-Yanktonai	sda
Teton	sla
Assiniboine	sna
Stoney	thna

Santee-Sisseton and Yankton-Yanktonai are languages that belong to the Dakotan group and Teton is a language in the Lakotan group. The table above illustrates a typical variation amongst these three languages. Just as the name of these three tribes suggest, the Dakota language, the Lakota language and the Nakota (Assiniboine) language have respective inclinations towards /d/, /l/, and /n/ in some substitutable consonants.

==== Arguments against the classification system ====
Some scholars argue that the D-N-L classification system may not be totally accurate due to the non-rigidness of the substitution form. They argue there was an expansive continuum such that the distinction between different languages does not manifest in a rigid, clear-cutting criterion. Historically, linguists have debated on Yankton-Yanktonai languages and their proper positions into the D-N-L classification system, but the coexistence of /d/ and /n/ phonemes made such classification doubtful. This example of lexical difference between the languages illustrates another possible distinction besides the D-N-L variations.

Language group	'horse'
Santee-Sisseton	súkataka
Yankton-Yanktonai	sukawaka
Teton	sukawaká
Assiniboine	súkataka
Stoney	suwatâga

=== Related languages ===
Sioux, Assiniboine, and Stoney are closely related languages of the Dakota family. Many linguists consider Assiniboine and Stoney to be dialects. However, they are mutually unintelligible. Parks and DeMallie report that they are not variant forms of a single dialect, but that Assiniboine is closer to the Sioux dialects than it is to Stoney. The exact number of interrelationships among the subdialects and dialects comprising this continuum is unknown.

Dialect group	Self-designation	Political designation
Santee-Sisseton	Dakhóta	Sioux
Yankton-Yanktonai	Dakȟóta	Sioux
Teton	Lakȟóta	Sioux
Assiniboine	Nakhóta	Assiniboine
Stoney	Nakoda	Stoney

== Geographic distribution ==
The languages of the Dakotan group are spoken in the following regions:

- Canada
  - Alberta
  - Manitoba
  - Saskatchewan
- United States
  - Minnesota
  - Montana
  - Nebraska
  - North Dakota
  - South Dakota

Reservation or reserve	Dialect
Alberta
Alexis	Stoney / Nakoda / Isga
Big Horn	Stoney / Îyârhe Nakoda / Nakoda
Eden Valley	Stoney / Îyârhe Nakoda / Nakoda
Paul	Stoney / Nakoda / Isga
Stoney (Morley)	Stoney / Îyârhe Nakoda / Nakoda
Saskatchewan
Carry the Kettle	Assiniboine / Nakhóta
Moose Woods (White Cap)	Sioux (Sisseton, Yanktonai) / Dakhóta / Dakȟóta
Mosquito-Grizzly Bear's Head	Assiniboine / Nakhóta
Sioux Wahpeton (Round Plain)	Sioux (Sisseton, Yanktonai) / Dakhóta / Dakȟóta
Standing Buffalo	Sioux (Sisseton, Yanktonai) / Dakhóta / Dakȟóta
Whitebear	Assiniboine / Nakhóta
Wood Mountain	Sioux (Teton) / Lakȟóta
Manitoba
Birdtail	Sioux (Santee) / Dakhóta
Oak Lake	Sioux (Santee) / Dakhóta
Sioux Valley	Sioux (Santee) / Dakhóta
Sioux Village-Long Plain	Sioux (Santee) / Dakhóta
North Dakota
Devil's Lake	Sioux (Sisseton, Yanktonai) / Dakhóta / Dakȟóta
Standing Rock	Sioux (Yanktonai) / Dakȟóta
South Dakota
Cheyenne River	Sioux (Teton) / Lakȟóta
Crow Creek	Sioux (Yanktonai) / Dakȟóta
Flandreau	Sioux (Santee) / Dakhóta
Lower Brule	Sioux (Teton) / Lakȟóta
Pine Ridge	Sioux (Teton) / Lakȟóta
Rosebud	Sioux (Teton) / Lakȟóta
Sisseton	Sioux (Santee) / Dakhóta
Standing Rock	Sioux (Teton) / Lakȟóta
Yankton	Sioux (Yankton) / Dakȟóta
Nebraska
Santee	Sioux (Santee) / Dakhóta
Minnesota
Lower Sioux	Sioux (Santee) / Dakhóta
Prairie Island	Sioux (Santee) / Dakhóta
Prior Lake	Sioux (Santee) / Dakhóta
Upper Sioux	Sioux (Santee) / Dakhóta
Montana
Fort Belknap	Assiniboine / Nakhóta
Fort Peck	Assiniboine, Sioux (Yanktonai, Sisseton) / Nakhóta / Dakȟóta / Dakhóta

== Official status ==
The Assiniboine language is not a government-recognized official language of any state or region where Assiniboine people live. There are two reservations located in Montana, but the official language of the state is English. An estimate of native speakers ranges from less than 50, to about 100, to about 150 Assiniboine people, most of them elderly. A 2021 study of Indigenous languages in Canada put Assiniboine at 350 speakers.

== Phonology ==
The phonemic inventory has 27 consonants, which includes aspirated, plain, and ejective stops. In addition to this, it has five oral vowels and three nasal vowels. It is a structure-preserving language. Assiniboine has no definite or indefinite articles, no nominal case system, and no verbal tense marking. Clauses unmarked are "realized", while clauses marked as "potential" by means of verbal enclitic, which is successful in producing a future/non-future distinction. The verbal system is split into active and stative (split-intransitive). The active object pronominal affixes coincide with the stative verbs of the subject pronominal affixes.

		Labial	Alveolar	Palatal or postalveolar	Velar	Glottal
Plosive	Plain	p	t	tʃ	k	ʔ
Plosive	Ejective	pʼ	tʼ	tʃʼ	kʼ	ʔ
Plosive	Aspirated	pʰ	tʰ	tʃʰ	kʰ	ʔ
Fricative	Voiceless		s	ʃ	x	
Fricative	Ejective		sʼ	ʃʼ	xʼ	
Fricative	Voiced		z	ʒ	ɣ	
Nasal		m	n			
Approximant		w		j		h (Note: Cumberland (2005) includes /h/ as a glide rather than fricative due to its frequent place assimilation to the following vowel.)

The affricates and stops of Assiniboine are often described as voiced rather than voiceless, due to intervocalic voicing rules which result in surface voiced forms.

=== Oral vowels ===
Character used	IPA symbol	Assiniboine pronunciation
i	i	i as in police
u	u	oo as in book
e	e	e as in a in mate
o	o	o as in vote
a	a	a as in father

=== Nasal vowels ===
Character	IPA symbol	Also used as
ą	ã	aⁿ, an, aη, aN
į	ĩ	iⁿ, in, iη, iN
ų	ũ	uⁿ, oⁿ, un, uη, uN

There are five oral vowels in Assiniboine, /i u e o a/, and three nasal vowels, /ĩ ũ ã/.

Words that follow the above rules:

- /bahá/ 'hill'
- /pahá/ 'hair'
- /čupó/ 'fog'
- /ptą/ 'otter'
- /pka/ 'heavy'
- /psi/ 'rice'
- /pša/ 'to sneeze'

=== Syllable structure ===
Syllables are primarily of CV structure. While codas are possible, they are restricted and uncommon, often becoming restructured as the onset of the following syllable. Onsets may include up to two consonants but codas must be simplex. Possible onset clusters are given in the following table:

		Second							
		p	t	k	s	š	c	m	n
First	p	-	ptą otter	-	psį rice	pšA sneeze	napcA swallow	-	-
First	t	-	-	tkA heavy	-	-	-	-	-
First	k	kpamni serve	kte kill	-	ksuyA hurt	kšikšA curly	pakcA comb	kmųkA snare	kni arrive
First	s	spayA wet	stustA tired	ską melt	-	-	scu bashful	smuna fine	sni cold
First	š	špą cooked	štuštA salty	škatA play	-	-	šcųka lazy	šma deep	šno melt
First	x	xpą soaked	xtayetu evening	-	-	-	xcina tattered	xma sleepy	xni have a sore
First	m	-	-	-	-	-	-	-	mnA smell

== Grammar ==
=== Morphology ===
Morphological processes for Assiniboine language are primarily agglutinating. In addition, the character of morpheme alternation in Assiniboine may be classified in terms of phoneme loss, phoneme shift, contraction, nasalization loss, syllable loss, syntactic contraction, and syntactic alternation.

==== Morphophonemics ====
Examples from Levin (1964).

Contraction->When two syllabics come into contact they contract as in:

/a/+/i/ > /i/

ápa + íyapi > ápayapi
morning + {they go} > {they stayed awake until morning}

nakóta + iápi > nakótiapi
ally + {they speak} > {a little Indian (to speak)}

/i/+/i/ > /i/

ohómini + íyapi > {(a) óhominiyapi}
circle + {they go} > {they circle}

/a/+/u/ > /u/

wicá + úkkupica > wicúkkupica
them + {we give} > {we give them}

Phoneme loss: Syllabics

when /a/ is in medial position between /k/ and /h/:

/a/> /∅/

waníyaka + hi > waníyakshi
{to see you} + {he comes} > {he came to see you}

when /o/ is in the medial position between /i/ and /k/:

/o/>/∅/

ukíce + okáxniga > ukícaxnigapi
{we ourselves} + {to understand} > {we understand each other}

when /e/ is in medial position between /p/ and /k/:

/e/>/Φ/

napé + kóza > napkóza
hand + {to wave} > {to beckon}

Phoneme loss: semi-syllabics

/y/ > /∅/ when
/y/ follows /n/

mn + yuhá > mnuhá
I + {to have} > {I have}

Phoneme loss: non-syllabics

/k/ is in medial position between /u/ and /k/ or /u/ and /h/ or /u/ and /n/ or /u/ and /y/

/k/ > /∅/

uk + kágapi > ukágapi
we + {they make} > {we make}

uk + ya + naxú > nauyaxúpi
we + you + {to hear} > {you hear us}

Phoneme shift: syllabics

/i/ > /a/ before /n/

awáci + ni > awácani
{to think} + you > {you think}

Phoneme shift: non-syllabics

When /a/--/e/ is in medial position between /g/ and /š/

/g/ > /x/

okáxnige + -ši > owákaxnixeši
{to understand} + -NEG > {I don't understand}

When /a/--/e/ is in medial position between /g/ and /c/

/g/ > /x/

okáxniga + -ce + wa > owákaxnixace
{to understand} + -ITER + I > {I understand}

When /g/ is in medial position between /a/ and /y/

/g/ > /x/

icáge + -ya > icáxya
{to grow} + -CAUS > {to cause to grow}

Nasalization loss exists as follows:

/ą/ > /a/

mázą + ska > mazáska
iron + white > money

Syllable loss occurs as follows:

/ye/ > /Φ/ Ex) iyópe... ye 'to pay' so, iyópe + wa + ye > iyópewa 'I pay'

Syntactic contraction: personal inflectional morphemes

wa 'I' + ni 'you' > ci 'I...you';

kku + ci + -kta > cicúta
{to give} + {I... you} + -FUT > {I will give you}

Syntactic contraction with verbal themes occurs as follows:

/i/ + /k/ – /kk/ > c;

i + kahíta > icáhita
{with something} + {to sweep} > broom

Syntactic alternation

/a/ > /e/ in verbal theme

wamnáka > wamnáke
{I saw} > {I saw}

/a/>/e/ in nomial theme

skúya > skúye
sweet > sweet

/a/>/e/ with the future suffix;

wicákkupikta > wicákkupikte
{they will be given} > {they will be given}

=== Syntax ===
Assiniboine has SOV word order. The order of elements may differ from canonical SOV; this is not free nor scrambling word order, but instead, the result of topicalization or other movements. Out-of-context sentences are always interpreted as SOV order even if it sounds odd. For example, 'the man bit the dog', unless an element is moved into a focus position. Focused element sentences are highly marked, and practically, a strange semantic reading is preferred over an interpretation of OSV. For example, the following sentence was interpreted as 'A banana ate the boy' by a native speaker, and to get the OSV reading out of it the object must be stressed, for example if the sentence was given as a reply to the question 'What did the boy eat?'.

škóškobena wãži hokšína že yúda.
banana a boy DET ate
'A banana ate the boy.' (or 'The boy ate a banana.')

Class 1

wa- 1st person+singular
ya- 2nd person

Class 2

ma- 1st person+singular
ni- 2nd person

For both class 1 and 2

ũ- 1st person-singular
o- 3rd person
wica- 3rd person
ci- 1st person + singular subject/ 2nd person object

== Vocabulary ==
1. wąži – one
2. nųba – two
3. yamni – three
4. tópa – four
5. záptą – five
6. šákpe – six
7. iyušna – seven
8. šaknoğą – eight
9. napcuwąga – nine
10. wikcémna – ten
11. saba – black
12. ska – white
13. ša – red
14. to – blue

More words can be found in the Dakota-English Dictionary.
