= Stoney Nakoda First Nation =

First Nation in Alberta, Canada

Stoney Nakoda
- Band No. 471
- Îyârhe Nakoda,
- People: Nakoda, Ye Xa Yabine Nakoda, Mountain Stoney,
- Treaty: Treaty 7
- Headquarters: Mînî Thnî, formerly Morley
- Province: Alberta, Canada

Land
- Main reserve: Stoney 142, 143, 144
- Reserves: Stoney 142B; Eden Valley 216; Big Horn 144A
- Land area: 477.75 km^{2} (184.46 sq mi)

Government
- Chief: Chief Darcy Dixon of the Bearspaw band, Chief Aaron Young of the Chiniki Band, Chief Clifford Poucette of the Goodstoney Band
- Council size: 9

Tribal Council
- Stoney Nakoda-Tsuut'ina Tribal Council Ltd (G4)

Website
- Stoney Nakoda First Nation

Stoney Nakoda First Nation (Stoney: Îyârhe Nakoda) is a Nakoda First Nations band government in Alberta, Canada. It is located West of Calgary, in the foot of the Rocky Mountains.

Stoney Nakoda First Nation comprises three Nakoda Tribes:

- Bearspaw First Nation Band No. 473
- Chiniki First Nation Band No. 433
- Goodstoney First Nation Band No. 475

== Bearspaw First Nation ==
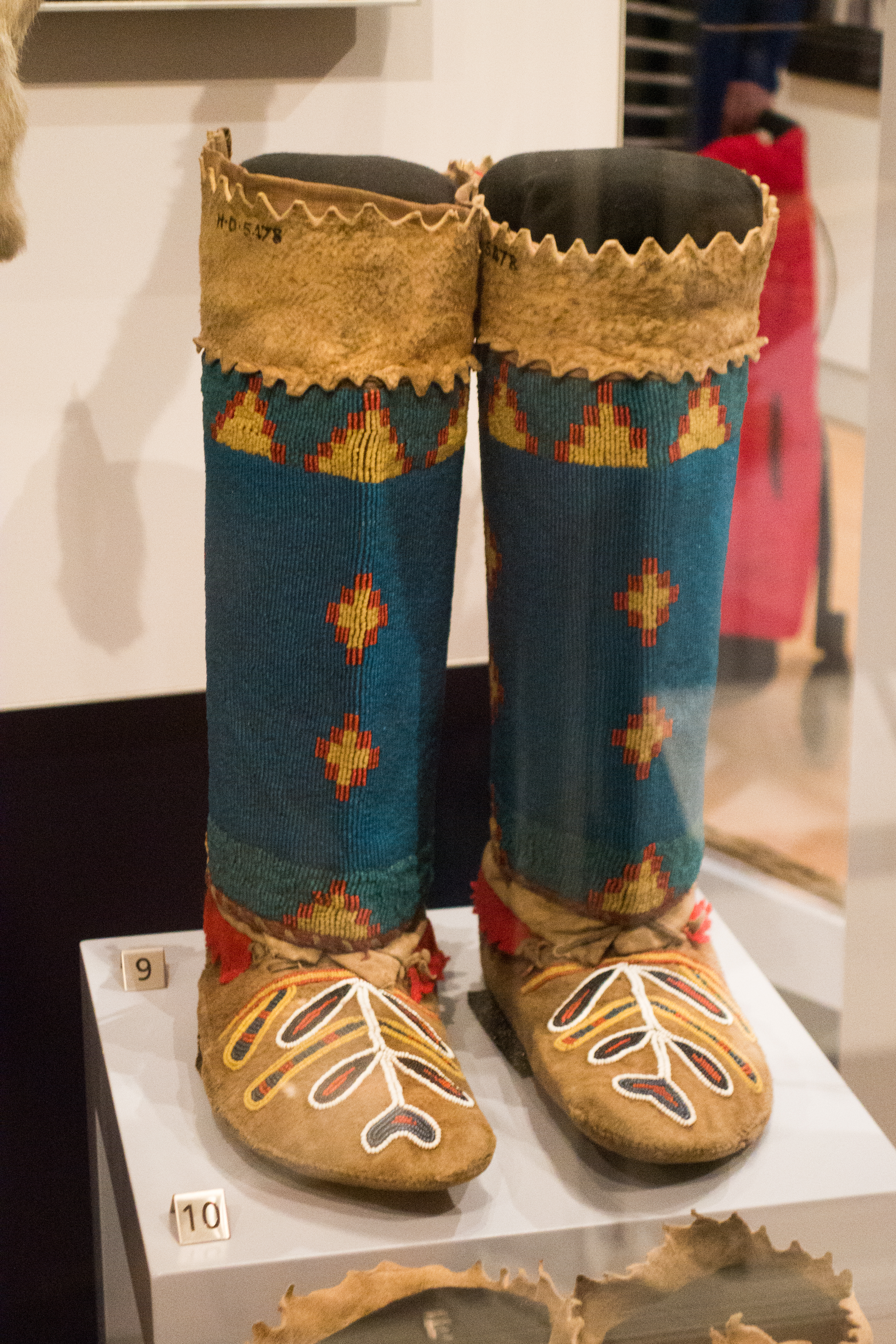
Moccasins from the Bearspaw First Nation, circa 1905

Bearspaw First Nation
- Band No. 473
- Bahada Tibin
- People: Stoney Nakoda, Bearspaw Band Bahada Tibin, People living up the hill
- Treaty: 7
- Province: Alberta, Canada

Population (2021)
- On reserve: 1853
- Off reserve: 237
- Total population: 2090

Government
- Chief: Darcy Dixon
- Council size: 4

Website
- bearspawfirstnation.ca

The Bearspaw First Nation is a First Nations band government of the Nakoda people in Alberta. This nation is part of the larger Stoney Nakoda First Nation.

The Bearspaw First Nation is a Nakoda (Stoney) First Nation located in southern Alberta, Canada, and is one of the three nations that form the Stoney Nakoda Nation along with the Chiniki and Goodstoney First Nations. The Bearspaw people are part of the Îyârhe Nakoda, often translated as “the people of the mountains.” Their traditional territory extends across the eastern slopes of the Rocky Mountains, the foothills of western Alberta, and parts of the northern Great Plains. Today most members live on the Stoney Indian reserves near the community of Mînî Thnî (Morley), west of Calgary, and on Eden Valley Indian Reserve No. 216. The First Nation takes its English name from Chief Jacob Bearspaw, known in the Nakoda language as Ozîja Thiha, who was an influential leader during the treaty period of the late nineteenth century.

The deeper history of the Bearspaw people begins long before the formation of Canada or European contact in the region. The Îyârhe Nakoda belong to the wider Nakoda or Assiniboine cultural and linguistic family, which is part of the Siouan language group that includes Dakota and Lakota peoples. Oral histories and linguistic research suggest that the ancestors of the Stoney Nakoda migrated westward from the northern plains centuries ago. Over time these groups established themselves in the foothills and mountain valleys of present-day Alberta, where they developed a distinct cultural identity tied to the Rocky Mountain environment. Their Nakoda language evolved as a unique dialect within the Sioux-Assiniboine language continuum and continues to be spoken among community members today.

Before European contact, the ancestors of the Bearspaw First Nation practiced a seasonal lifestyle based on movement across a large territory. During the warmer months families travelled eastward onto the plains to hunt bison, which provided meat, hides, and materials for tools and shelter. During the winter many groups returned to the foothills and mountain valleys where forests and river systems supported elk, deer, fish, and plant gathering. This seasonal cycle allowed communities to maintain a balanced relationship with the landscape and ensured the long-term sustainability of resources. The Bow River valley, Kananaskis region, and surrounding mountain passes served as important travel corridors linking the plains with the interior of what is now British Columbia.

The Stoney Nakoda also participated in extensive intertribal networks across the northern Plains. They traded with neighbouring Indigenous nations and sometimes formed alliances or rivalries depending on political and economic circumstances. Among the most significant neighbouring nations was the Blackfoot Confederacy, which included the Siksika Nation, Kainai Nation, and Piikani Nation. The Stoney Nakoda also maintained relations with the Tsuut’ina Nation. These interactions involved trade, diplomacy, and occasional conflict over territory and hunting grounds. Such relationships formed a complex political landscape across the plains and foothills long before the arrival of colonial governments.

European influence began to affect the Stoney Nakoda during the late eighteenth and early nineteenth centuries with the expansion of the fur trade. Traders associated with companies such as the Hudson’s Bay Company and the North West Company travelled through the region and established trading relationships with Indigenous communities. Through this exchange the Nakoda obtained firearms, metal tools, cloth, and other goods, while traders received furs and provisions. Although trade provided new resources, it also introduced economic changes and increased dependence on European goods. At the same time missionaries and explorers began documenting aspects of Nakoda culture and language.

By the mid nineteenth century major transformations were occurring across the northern Plains. The near-annihilation of the bison by colonists, increased settler expansion, and the establishment of colonial governments created pressures on Indigenous societies. In response, the Stoney Nakoda joined other nations in negotiating with representatives of the British Crown. On 22 September 1877 leaders including Chief Bearspaw signed Treaty 7 at Blackfoot Crossing. The treaty established a formal relationship between the Crown and several Indigenous nations of southern Alberta. It created reserve lands and included promises of assistance with food supplies, tools, education, and agricultural resources during the transition from a bison-based economy.

Following the treaty period the Stoney Nakoda were settled on reserves along the Bow River west of Calgary. Over time the broader Stoney Band was administratively divided into three separate First Nations: Bearspaw, Chiniki, and Goodstoney. These communities collectively administered several reserves, including Stoney Indian Reserves 142, 143, and 144 near Mînî Thnî and Eden Valley Reserve 216 further south. Despite the administrative division, the three nations share common ancestry, language, and cultural traditions.

The late nineteenth and twentieth centuries brought many challenges to the Bearspaw community. Canadian federal policies under the Indian Act imposed strict control over Indigenous governance, land use, and social structures. Traditional leadership systems were replaced by elected band councils and many cultural practices were restricted. Children from the Stoney Nakoda communities were sent to residential schools where the use of Indigenous languages and cultural practices was discouraged or prohibited. These policies had long-lasting effects on families and cultural transmission across generations.

Despite these pressures the Bearspaw people maintained strong cultural traditions and community identity. The Stoney Nakoda language continues to be spoken at ceremonies, community gatherings, and meetings of leadership. Cultural events such as powwows, spiritual ceremonies, and traditional storytelling remain central to the preservation of Nakoda heritage. Many mountains, rivers, and valleys across southern Alberta retain traditional Nakoda names, reflecting the deep relationship between the people and the landscape. Examples include names such as Îyâ Mnathka, meaning “flat-faced mountain,” known in English as Mount Yamnuska, and Minnewanka, meaning “sacred waters.”

During the late twentieth and early twenty-first centuries the Bearspaw First Nation increasingly pursued political autonomy and economic development. Investments in infrastructure, telecommunications, and commercial enterprises have been developed on reserve lands, including tourism and service projects along major transportation routes near the Bow Valley. Nation-owned telecommunications networks expanded internet access across Morley and Eden Valley, improving connectivity for residents and supporting local businesses.

In recent years Bearspaw leadership has also pursued greater financial and political independence through trust funds and governance initiatives. Agreements with the federal government allowed the Nation to assume control over capital trust funds and establish investment programs intended to support long-term community development and education. These initiatives aim to strengthen economic stability while supporting future generations of Bearspaw members.

Today the Bearspaw First Nation remains an important part of the Îyârhe Nakoda people and continues to maintain strong cultural and political ties with the Chiniki and Goodstoney Nations. The community’s history reflects centuries of connection to the Rocky Mountain foothills, the challenges of colonial expansion and treaty relationships, and ongoing efforts to preserve Nakoda culture while building economic and political strength for the future.

In November 2010, a dispute arose when the chief of the band, David Bearspaw, cancelled a forthcoming election and extended his term by two years, prompting a protest blockade of the Eden Valley 216 reserve by other band members. A judge ordered elections to go ahead, and the incumbent was defeated by Darcy Dixon.

== Chiniki First Nation ==
Chiniki First Nation
- Band No. 433
- Orhnatiya Tibin
- People: Stoney Nakoda Orhnatiya Tibin, Those who live between
- Treaty: 7
- Province: Alberta

Population (2021)
- On reserve: 1576
- Off reserve: 204
- Total population: 1780

Government
- Chief: Aaron Young
- Council size: 4

The Chiniki First Nation is a First Nations band government of the Nakoda people in Alberta. This nation is part of the larger Stoney Nakoda First Nation. In September 2015, they became a signatory to the Buffalo Treaty.

== Goodstoney First Nation ==
Goodstoney First Nation
- Band No. 475
- Thmâgada Tibin
- People: Stoney Nakoda, Thmâgada Tibin, Those who live in the valley, Down the hill.
- Province: Alberta

Population (2021)
- On reserve: 1589
- Off reserve: 255
- Total population: 1841

Government
- Chief: Clifford Poucette
- Council size: 4

Website
- X - Wesley First Nation

The Goodstoney First Nation (formerly Wesley First Nation) is a First Nations band government of the Nakoda people in Alberta. This nation is part of the larger Stoney Nakoda First Nation. In September 2015, they became signatories to the Buffalo Treaty.

== Reserves ==
Indian reserves shared between the three component nations, under the administration of the Stoney Nakoda First Nation are:

- Stoney 142, 143, 144, 56 km (35 mi) west of Calgary, 39,264.50 ha (97,024.7 acres) 51°09′N 114°56′W
- Stoney 142B, 48 km (30 mi) northwest of Calgary, 5,692.40 ha (14,066.2 acres) 51°19′42″N 114°46′13″W
- Big Horn 144A, Township 39, Range 16 west of the Fifth Meridian, 2,127.40 ha (5,256.9 acres) 52°22′45″N 116°15′08″W
- Eden Valley 216, 80 km (50 mi) southwest of Calgary, 1,690.80 ha (4,178.1 acres) 50°26′10″N 114°25′34″W

== See also ==
- Stoney language
- Nakoda people
- Treaty 7
