= Morley Air Station =

Former air station near Morley, Alberta, Canada

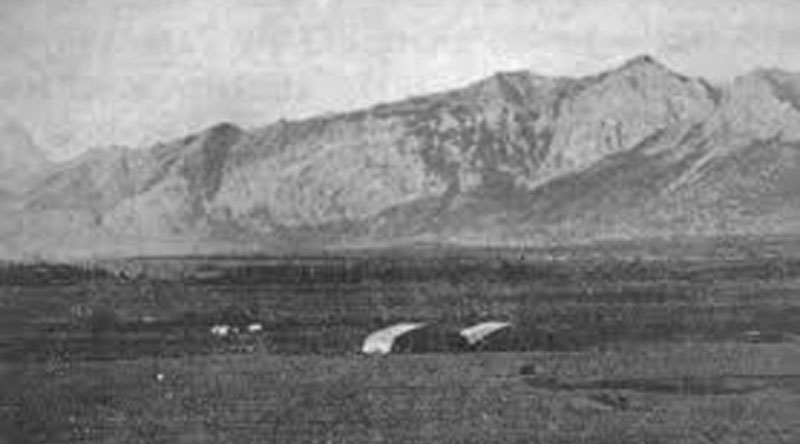
Morley Air Station showing two Bessonneau (canvas) hangars.

The Morley Air Station was a station of the Canadian Air Board's Flying Operations Branch located near Morley, Alberta on the Stoney 142, 143, 144 Reserve. Morley was one of five stations established by the Flying Operations Branch during its first summer of operations in 1920. The station operated Airco DH.4 and Airco DH.9A aircraft on forest fire patrols along eastern edge of the Rocky Mountains. The Morley air station was the first air station established in Canada for the purpose of flying forest patrols.

Forest fires had been destroying large areas of the federal forest reserve on the eastern slopes of the Rocky Mountains. Valuable timber was being lost and since the forests were located in the headwaters of rivers that flowed east into the prairies, there was concern that the forest destruction would affect the quality and quantity of water that was needed in the prairies for agricultural purposes. The problem was deemed serious so the government planned a ground-based lookout system, but aircraft patrols were implemented first. In August, 1920 temporary canvas hangars were set up for the aircraft and a patrol area was established running from the Canada–United States border to the Yellowhead Pass. Daily patrols were flown during September and October under the leadership of Squadron Leader G. M. Croil. Pilots communicated fire locations via wireless telegraphy. By the end of the season the government determined air patrols to be successful and decided to abandon the ground-based lookout system and continue air protection in 1921.

Due to strong and erratic winds in proximity to the Rocky Mountains, the Morley Air Station was moved to High River over the winter of 1920–21, and became the High River Air Station.
