= Niddrie =

Niddrie or Niddry can mean:

== Places ==
- Niddrie, Victoria, a suburb of Melbourne, Australia
- Electoral district of Niddrie, Victoria, Australia
- Niddrie, Edinburgh, Scotland, a suburb of Edinburgh
  - Niddrie railway station
- Niddry Castle, built about 1500, near Winchburgh, Scotland

== People ==
- Frederick Niddrie (1890–1958), Canadian politician
- John W. Niddrie (1863–1940), Scottish pioneer and missionary in Canada, and memoirist
- John Hope, 4th Earl of Hopetoun (1765–1823), also Baron Niddry, British Army general and politician

== Other uses ==
- Niddrie Technical College, original name of Rosehill Secondary College, Niddrie, Victoria, Australia
- Niddrie High School, amalgamated with other schools into Essendon Keilor College, Niddrie, Victoria

== See also ==
- Archibald Wauchope of Niddrie (c. 1565 – 1597), Scottish landowner and rebel
- Longniddry, East Lothian, Scotland
