= Stoney 142B =

Coordinates: 51°19′42″N 114°46′13″W

- Indian reserve
- Stoney Indian Reserve No. 142B
- Location in Alberta
- First Nations: Stoney Nakoda: Bearspaw; Chiniki; Wesley
- Treaty: 7
- Country: Canada
- Province: Alberta
- Municipal district: Bighorn

Area
  - Total: 5,692.4 ha (14,066 acres)
- Time zone: UTC−06:00 (Alberta Time)

Stoney 142B is an Indian reserve of the Stoney Nakoda First Nation, comprising Bearspaw, Chiniki, and Wesley First Nations in Alberta, located within the Municipal District of Bighorn No. 8. It is 48 kilometres northwest of Calgary, Alberta, Canada.
