= The Language Conservancy =

US-based non-profit organization

The Language Conservancy is a nonprofit organization that with an interest in the Lakota language, Assiniboine language, Crow language and the Hidatsa language.

The Language Conservancy is currently focused largely on Indigenous languages in the United States.

One of its board members, Jan Ullrich, has been banned from Indigenous territories after monetizing the language resources he collected from within the community.
