= Sioux language =

Siouan language spoken predominantly by the Sioux

Sioux
- Dakota, Lakota
- Native to: United States, Canada
- Region: Northern Nebraska, southern Minnesota, North Dakota, South Dakota, northeastern Montana; southern Manitoba, southern Saskatchewan
- Ethnicity: Sioux
- Speakers: ~13,100 (2021): L1: ~2,100; L2: ~11,000
- Language family: Siouan: Western Siouan; Mississippi Valley; Dakotan; Sioux
- Dialects: Lakota; Dakota

Official status
- Official language in: United States; South Dakota

Language codes
- ISO 639-2: dak
- ISO 639-3: Either: dak – Dakota lkt – Lakota
- Glottolog: dako1258 Dakota lako1247 Lakota
- ELP: Sioux
- Linguasphere: 62-AAC-a
- Sioux is classified as Vulnerable by the UNESCO Atlas of the World's Languages in Danger

Sioux is a Siouan language spoken by approximately 13,000 Sioux people in the United States and Canada, making it the fifth most spoken Indigenous language in the United States or Canada, behind Navajo, Cree, Inuit languages, and Ojibwe.

Since 2019, "the language of the Great Sioux Nation, comprised of three dialects, Dakota, Lakota, and Nakota" is the official Indigenous language of South Dakota.

== Regional variation ==
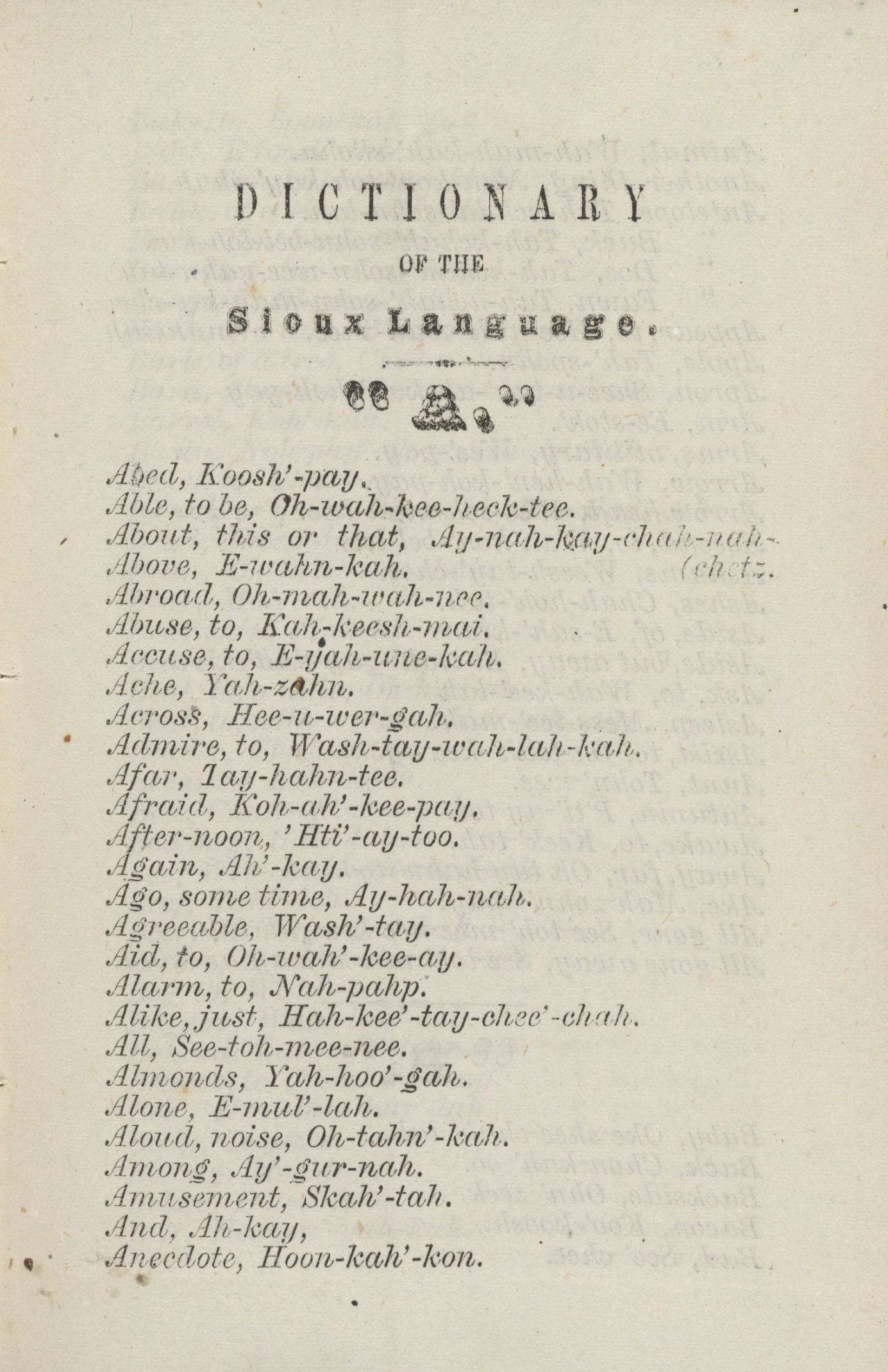
Page from Dictionary of the Sioux Language, 1866

Sioux has three major regional varieties, with other sub-varieties:

1. Lakota (a.k.a. Lakȟóta, Teton, Teton Sioux)
2. Western Dakota (a.k.a. Yankton-Yanktonai or Dakȟóta, and erroneously classified, for a very long time, as "Nakota")
  - Yankton (Iháŋktȟuŋwaŋ)
  - Yanktonai (Iháŋktȟuŋwaŋna)
3. Eastern Dakota (a.k.a. Santee-Sisseton or Dakhóta)
  - Santee (Isáŋyáthi: Bdewákhathuŋwaŋ, Waȟpékhute)
  - Sisseton (Sisíthuŋwaŋ, Waȟpéthuŋwaŋ)

Yankton-Yanktonai (Western Dakota) stands between Santee-Sisseton (Eastern Dakota) and Lakota within the dialect continuum. It is phonetically closer to Santee-Sisseton but lexically and grammatically, it is much closer to Lakota. For this reason Lakota and Western Dakota are much more mutually intelligible than each is with Eastern Dakota. The assumed extent of mutual intelligibility is usually overestimated by speakers of the language. While Lakota and Yankton-Yanktonai speakers understand each other to a great extent, they each find it difficult to follow Santee-Sisseton speakers.

Closely related to the Sioux language are the Assiniboine and Stoney languages, whose speakers use the self-designation term (autonym) Nakhóta or Nakhóda.

=== Comparison of Sioux and Nakota languages and dialects ===
==== Phonetic differences ====
The following table shows some of the main phonetic differences between the regional varieties of the Sioux language. The table also provides comparison with the two closely related Nakota languages (Assiniboine and Stoney).

Sioux					Nakota		gloss
Lakota	Western Dakota		Eastern Dakota		Assiniboine	Stoney	gloss
Lakota	Yanktonai	Yankton	Sisseton	Santee	Assiniboine	Stoney	gloss
Lakȟóta	Dakȟóta		Dakhóta		Nakhóta	Nakhóda	self-designation
lowáŋ	dowáŋ		dowáŋ		nowáŋ		to sing
ló	dó		dó		nó		assertion
čísčila	čísčina		čístina		čúsina	čúsin	small
hokšíla	hokšína		hokšína	hokšída	hokšína	hokšín	boy
gnayáŋ	gnayáŋ	knayáŋ	hnayáŋ		knayáŋ	hna	to deceive
glépa	gdépa	kdépa	hdépa		knépa	hnéba	to vomit
kigná	kigná	kikná	kihná		kikná	gihná	to soothe
slayá	sdayá		sdayá		snayá	snayá	to grease
wičháša	wičháša		wičhášta		wičhášta	wičhá	man
kibléza	kibdéza		kibdéza		kimnéza	gimnéza	to sober up
yatkáŋ	yatkáŋ		yatkáŋ		yatkáŋ	yatkáŋ	to drink
hé	hé		hé		žé	žé	that

==== Lexical differences ====
English gloss	Santee-Sisseton	Yankton-Yanktonai	Lakota	
English gloss	Santee-Sisseton	Yankton-Yanktonai	Northern Lakota	Southern Lakota
child	šičéča	wakȟáŋyeža	wakȟáŋyeža	
knee	hupáhu	čhaŋkpé	čhaŋkpé	
knife	isáŋ / mína	mína	míla	
kidneys	phakšíŋ	ažúŋtka	ažúŋtka	
hat	wapháha	wapȟóštaŋ	wapȟóštaŋ	
still	hináȟ	naháŋȟčiŋ	naháŋȟčiŋ	
man	wičhášta	wičháša	wičháša	
hungry	wótehda	dočhíŋ	ločhíŋ	
morning	haŋȟ’áŋna	híŋhaŋna	híŋhaŋna	híŋhaŋni
to shave	kasáŋ	kasáŋ	kasáŋ	glak’óǧa

== Writing systems ==
In 1827, John Marsh and his wife, Marguerite (who was half Sioux), wrote the first dictionary of the Sioux language. They also wrote a "Grammar of the Sioux Language."

Life for the Dakota changed significantly in the nineteenth century as the early years brought increased contact with European settlers, particularly Christian missionaries. The goal of the missionaries was to introduce the Dakota to Christian beliefs. To achieve this, the missions began to transcribe the Dakota language. In 1836, brothers Samuel and Gideon Pond, Rev. Stephen Return Riggs, and Dr. Thomas Williamson set out to begin translating hymns and Biblical narratives into Dakota. By 1852, Riggs and Williamson had completed a Dakota Grammar and Dictionary (Saskatchewan Indian Cultural Center). Eventually, the entire Bible was translated.

Today, it is possible to find a variety of texts in Dakota. Traditional stories have been translated, children's books, even games such as Pictionary and Scrabble. Despite such progress, written Dakota is not without its difficulties. The Pond brothers, Rev. Riggs, and Dr. Williamson were not the only missionaries documenting the Dakota language. Around the same time, missionaries in other Dakota bands were developing their own versions of the written language. Since the 1900s, professional linguists have been creating their own versions of the orthography. The Dakota have also been making modifications. "Having so many different writing systems is causing confusion, conflict between our [the Dakota] people, causing inconstancy in what is being taught to students, and making the sharing of instructional and other materials very difficult" (SICC).

Prior to the introduction of the Latin alphabet, the Dakota did have a writing system of their own: one of representational pictographs. In pictographic writing, a drawing represents exactly what it means. For example, a drawing of a dog literally meant a dog. Palmer writes that,

As a written language, it [pictographs] was practical enough that it allowed the Lakota to keep a record of years in their winter counts which can still be understood today, and it was in such common usage that pictographs were recognized and accepted by census officials in the 1880s, who would receive boards or hides adorned with the head of the household’s name depicted graphically. (pg. 34)

For the missionaries, however, documenting the Bible through pictographs was impractical and presented significant challenges.

Comparative table of Dakota and Lakota orthographies
IPA	Buechel & Manhart spelling (pronunciation)	Standard orthography	Brandon University	Deloria & Boas	Dakota Mission	Rood & Taylor	Riggs	Williamson	University of Minnesota	White Hat	Txakini Practical
ʔ	´	´	ʾ	´	none	ʼ	´	´	´	none	'
a	a	a	a	a	a	a	a	a	a	a	a
aː	a (á)	á	a	a	a	a	a	a	a	a	'a (Note: Marks a stressed initial syllable)
ã	an, an' (aƞ)	aŋ	an̄	ą	an	ą	aŋ	aŋ	aŋ	aƞ	an
p~b	b	b	b	b	b	b	b	b	b	b	b
tʃ	c	č	c	c	c	č	ć	c	c	c̄	c
tʃʰ	c (c, c̔)	čh	ć	cʽ	c	čh	ć̣	c̣	c̣	ċ (Note: Saskatchewan uses c̀ for White Hat's ċ)	ch
tʃʼ	c’	č’	c̦	c’	c	čʼ	ć	c	c’	ċ’	c'
t~d	none	none	d	d	d	d	d	d	d	d	d
e~ɛ	e	e	e	e	e	e	e	e	e	e	e
eː~ɛː	e (é)	é	e	e	e	e	e	e	e	e	'e
k~ɡ	g	g	g	g	g	g	g	g	g	g	g
ʁ~ɣ	g (ġ)	ǧ	ǥ	ġ	g	ǧ	ġ	ġ	ġ	ġ	gx
h	h	h	h	h	h	h	h	h	h	h	h
χ	h̔	ȟ	ħ	ḣ	r	ȟ	ḣ	ḣ	ḣ	ḣ	x
χʔ~χʼ	h’ (h̔’)	ȟ’	ħ̦	ḣ’	r	ȟʼ	ḣ	ḣ	ḣ’	ḣ’	x'
i	i	i	i	i	i	i	i	i	i	i	i
iː	i (í)	í	i	i	i	i	i	i	i	i	'i
ĩ	in, in' (iƞ)	iŋ	in̄	į	in	į	iŋ	iŋ	iŋ	iƞ	in
k	k (k, k̇)	k	k	k	k	k	k	k	k	k	k
kʰ~kˣ	k	kh	k̔	k‘	k	kh	k	k	ḳ	k	kh
qˣ~kˠ	k (k̔)	kȟ	k̔	k‘	k	kh	k	k	ḳ	k̇	kx
kʼ	k’	k’	ķ	k’	q	kʼ	ḳ	ḳ	k’	k’	k'
l	l	l	none	l	none	l	l	l	none	l	l
lː	l´	none	none	none	none	none	none	none	none	none	none
m	m	m	m	m	m	m	m	m	m	m	m
n	n	n	n	n	n	n	n	n	n	n	n
ŋ	n	n	n	n	n	ň	n	n	n	n	ng
o	o	o	o	o	o	o	o	o	o	o	o
oː	o (ó)	ó	o	o	o	o	o	o	o	o	'o
õ~ũ	on, on' (oƞ)	uŋ	un̄	ų	on	ų	oŋ	oŋ	uŋ	uƞ	un
p	ṗ (p, ṗ)	p	p	p	p	p	p	p	p	p̄	p
pʰ	p	ph	p̔	p‘	p	ph	p	p	p̣	p	ph
pˣ~pˠ	p (p̔)	pȟ	p̔	p‘	p	ph	p	p	p̣	ṗ	px
pʼ	p’	p’	p̦	p’	p	pʼ	p̣	p̣	p’	p’	p'
s	s	s	s	s	s	s	s	s	s	s	s
sʼ	s’	s’	ș	s’	s	sʼ	s’	s’	s’	s’	s'
ʃ	š	š	š	ṡ	x, ś	š	ś	ṡ	ṡ	ṡ (Note: Saskatchewan uses s̀ for White Hat's ṡ)	sh
ʃʔ~ʃʼ	š’	š’	ș̌	ṡ’	x, ś	š	ś’	ṡ’	ṡ’	ṡ’	sh'
t	t (t, ṫ)	t	t	t	t	t	t	t	t	t̄	t
tʰ	t	th	tʿ	tʽ	t	th	t	t	ṭ	t	th
tˣ~tˠ	t (t̔)	tȟ	tʿ	tʽ	t	th	t	t	ṭ	ṫ	tx
tʼ	t’	t’	ţ	t’	t	tʼ	ṭ	ṭ	t’	t’	t'
u	u	u	u	u	u	u	u	u	u	u	u
uː	u (ú)	ú	u	u	u	u	u	u	u	u	'u
õ~ũ	un, un' (uƞ)	uŋ	un̄	ų	un	ų	uŋ	uŋ	uŋ	uƞ	un
w	w	w	w	w	w	w	w	w	w	w	w
j	y	y	y	y	y	y	y	y	y	y	y
z	z	z	z	z	z	z	z	z	z	z	z
ʒ	j	ž	ž	z	j	ž	ź	ż	ż	j	zh

== Structure ==
=== Phonology ===
See Lakota language – Phonology and Dakota language – Phonology.

=== Morphology ===
Dakota is an agglutinating language. It features suffixes, prefixes, and infixes. Each affix has a specific rule in Dakota. For example, the suffix –pi is added to the verb to mark the plurality of an animate subject. "With respect to number agreement for objects, only animate objects are marked, and these by the verbal prefix wicha-." Also, there is no gender agreement in Dakota.

Example of the use of –pi:

ma-khata
I-hot
"I am hot"

khata-pi
0‍-hot-PL
"they are hot"

Example of the use of wicha-

wa-kte
0‍-I-kill
"I kill him"

wicha-wa-kte
them-I-kill
"I kill them"

Infixes are rare in Dakota, but do exist when a statement features predicates requiring two "patients".

Example of infixing:

iye-checa → iye-ni-ma-checa
{to resemble} {} {I resemble you}
"you resemble me"

iskola → i-ni-ma-skola
{be as small as} {} {I am as small as you}
"you are as small as I"

=== Syntax ===
Dakota has subject/object/ verb (SOV) word order. Along the same line, the language also has postpositions. Examples of word order:

wichasta-g {wax aksica-g} kte
man-DET bear-DET kill
"the man killed the bear"

{wax aksicas-g} wichasta-g kte
bear-DET man-DET kill
"the bear killed the man"

According to Shaw, word order exemplifies grammatical relations.

In Dakota, the verb is the most important part of the sentence. There are many verb forms in Dakota, although they are "dichotomized into a stative-active classification, with the active verbs being further subcategorized as transitive or intransitive." Some examples of this are:

1. stative:
  - ma-khata "I am hot" (I-hot)
  - ni-khata "you are hot" (you-hot)
  - khata "he/she/it is hot" (0-hot)
  - u-khata "we (you and I) are hot" (we-hot)
  - u-khata-pi "we (excl. or pl) are hot" (we-hot-pl.)
  - ni-khata-pi "you (pl.) are hot" (you-hot-pl.)
  - khata-pi "they are hot" (0-hot-pl.)
2. active intransitive
  - wa-hi "I arrive (coming)" (I-arrive)
  - ya-hi "you arrive" (you-arrive)
  - hi "he arrives"
  - u-hi "we (you and I) arrive"
  - u-hi-pi "we (excl. or pl.) arrive"
  - ya-hi-pi "you (pl.) arrive"
  - hi-pi they arrive"
3. active transitive
  - wa-kte "I kill him" (0-I-kill)
  - wicha-wa-kte "I kill them" (them-I-kill)
  - chi-kte "I kill you" (I-you (portmanteau)- kill)
  - ya-kte "you kill him" (0-you-kill)
  - wicha-ya-kte "you kill them" (them- you-kill)
  - wicha-ya-kte-pi "you (pl.) kill them"
  - ma-ya-kte "you kill me" (me-you-kill)
  - u-ya-kte-pi "you kill us" (we-you-kill-pl.)
  - ma-ktea "he kills me" (0-me-kill-pl.)
  - ni-kte-pi "they kill you" (0-you-kill-pl.)
  - u-ni-kte-pi "we kill you" (we-you-kill-pl.)
  - wicha-u-kte "we (you and I) kill them" (them-we-kill)

== Bibliography ==
- "Scrabble helps keep Dakota language alive". Bismarck Tribune. AP. 2006-03-26. Archived from the original on 2008-10-21.
- Catches, Violet (1999?). Txakini-iya Wowapi. Lakxota Kxoyag Language Preservation Project.
- DeMallie, Raymond J. (2001). "The Sioux until 1850". In DeMallie, R. J. (ed.). Handbook of North American Indians. Vol. 13: Plains. Washington, DC: Smithsonian Institution. pp. 718–760. ISBN 0-16-050400-7.
- de Reuse, Willem J. (1987). "One hundred years of Lakota linguistics (1887–1987)". Kansas Working Papers in Linguistics. 12: 13–42. doi:10.17161/KWPL.1808.509. hdl:1808/509.
- de Reuse, Willem J. (1990). "A supplementary bibliography of Lakota languages and linguistics (1887–1990)". Kansas Working Papers in Linguistics. 15 (2): 146–165. doi:10.17161/KWPL.1808.441. hdl:1808/441.
- Eastman, M. H. (1995). Dahcotah or, life and legends of the Sioux around Fort Snelling. Afton: Afton Historical Society Press.
- Howard, J. H. (1966). Anthropological papers number 2: the Dakota or Sioux Indians: a study in human ecology. Vermillion: Dakota Museum.
- Hunhoff, B. (2005-11-30). "It's safely recorded in a book at last". Editor's Notebook. South Dakota Magazine. Archived from the original on 2008-09-23.
- McCrady, D.G. (2006). Living with strangers: the nineteenth-century Sioux and the Canadian-American borderlands. Lincoln: University of Nebraska Press.
- Palmer, J.D. (2008). The Dakota peoples: a history of the Dakota, Lakota, and Nakota through 1863. Jefferson: McFarland & Company.
- Parks, D.R.; DeMallie, R.J. (1992). "Sioux, Assiniboine, and Stoney Dialects: A Classification". Anthropological Linguistics. 34 (1–4): 233–255. JSTOR 30028376.
- Parks, Douglas R.; Rankin, Robert L. (2001). "The Siouan languages". Handbook of North American Indians. Vol. 13: Plains. Washington, DC: Smithsonian Institution. pp. 94–114.
- Riggs, S.R. (1893). Dakota grammar, texts, and ethnography. Washington, D.C.: Government Printing Office.
- Riggs, S.R.; Dorsey, J.O., eds. (1973). Dakota grammar, texts, and ethnography. Minneapolis: Ross & Haines.
- Robinson, D. (1956). A history of the Dakota or Sioux Indians: from their earliest traditions and first contact with white men to the final settlement of the last of them upon reservations and the consequent abandonment of the old tribal life. Minneapolis: Ross & Haines.
- Rood, David S.; Taylor, Allan R. (1996). "Sketch of Lakhota, a Siouan language". Handbook of North American Indians. Vol. 17: Languages. Washington, DC: Smithsonian Institution. pp. 440–482.
- "Our languages: Dakota Lakota Nakota". Saskatchewan Indian Cultural Center. Archived from the original on 2005-12-18.
- Shaw, P.A. (1980). Theoretical issues in Dakota phonology and morphology. New York: Garland Publishing.
- Utley, R.M. (1963). The last days of the Sioux nation. New Haven: Yale University Press.
