= Big Horn 144A =

Coordinates: 52°22′45″N 116°15′08″W

- Indian reserve
- Big Horn Indian Reserve No. 144A
- Location in Alberta
- First Nations: Stoney Nakoda: Bearspaw; Chiniki; Wesley
- Treaty: 6
- Country: Canada
- Province: Alberta
- Municipal district: Clearwater

Area
  - Total: 2,127.4 ha (5,257 acres)

Population (2016)
  - Total: 237
  - Density: 11.1/km^{2} (28.9/sq mi)
- Time zone: UTC−06:00 (Alberta Time)

Big Horn 144A is an Indian reserve of the Stoney Nakoda First Nation, comprising Bearspaw, Chiniki, and Wesley First Nations in Alberta, located within Clearwater County. In the 2016 Canadian Census, it recorded a population of 237 living in 44 of its 59 total private dwellings.

Formed in 1948, Big Horn 144A is roughly 100 miles north of the main Stoney reserve at Morley.

According to the 2011 national Community Well Being Index, it is the poorest First Nations community in Canada.
