= Sharphead band =

Former band of Nakoda people

In the north, the three bands which came under Treaty Six all chose reserves in their traditional hunting areas. Alexis' band, with 42 families, took a reserve on the shores of Lac Ste. Anne, while Paul's band settled on Lake Wabamun. Initially, Sharphead's followers were at Pigeon Lake but when the fisheries failed in 1883, they were induced to take a reserve on Wolf Creek, just south of the present town of Ponoka.

Of all the Stoney bands in Alberta, the Sharpheads had the most tragic history. Although consisting of 36 families in 1883, they were struck down by a measles epidemic three years later and, in 1889 and 1890, epidemics of grippe and influenza reduced them to a mere handful. In the latter year, their reserve was closed, with most of the survivors going to Paul's band, and a few to Morley

— (Dempsey 1988: 45-46)

The Sharphead band was an Indigenous people of what is now central Alberta, which was a part of the Stoney (Nakoda) ethno-linguistic group and was party to Treaty 6 (1876) with the Canadian Crown. The Sharphead were devastated by hunger and disease and ceased to exist as a separate people after 1897 when their reserve lands were taken by the Canadian government and the few remaining survivors were dispersed to live with other neighbouring First Nations.

== Post-contact history ==
Following their entry into treaty, the Sharphead people continued to live a traditional nomadic lifestyle until 1885 when the Sharphead Indian Reserve No. 141 was created within the District of Alberta, North-West Territories (later the Province of Alberta) under the terms of the Indian Act. As surveyed in October 1885, the reserve had an area of 110 km^{2} (42.4 sq mi) along the Battle River and Wolf Creek, and included a Methodist mission. The reserve was west of Ponoka, and the Queen Elizabeth II Highway runs through its former lands.

According to Canadian records, between 1886 and 1893 the band was devastated by smallpox, crop failures, and declining hunting. During that time, more than half of the population is estimated to have died, while the survivors dispersed and moved to other reserves. The band was deemed to be extinct by the federal government and the reserve land was surrendered in 1897 and divided into homesteads for Euro-Canadian settlers. Historical records around the Sharphead are very sparse and it was not until the mid-1970s that researchers were able to trace Sharphead descendants to 15 neighbouring bands.

The movement towards securing a surrender of the land seems to have been initiated by Hayter Reed first as Indian Commissioner, then, after 1893, as Deputy Superintendent General of Indian Affairs. As well, outside pressure from Frank Oliver, a prominent Edmonton Liberal, publisher of the Edmonton Bulletin and future cabinet minister, seems to have played a part, according to a 1998 report by Peggy Martin-McGuire for the Indian Claims Commission.

== Cemetery and memorial ==
In 1965 workers installing an electrical power line discovered human remains from 26 individuals at a cemetery site on the former reserve. The remains were taken by the University of Alberta's anthropology department for study until 1970 when they were put in storage because the then-owner of the land containing the burial site did not want them reinterred. In 2007 electrical workers discovered more remains on the same site which prompted the provincial government and 14 nearby bands to begin to search for a new burial site for the remains. In the summer of 2013 land was purchased by the provincial government near the town of Ponoka close to the Battle River. Ponoka County objected to the plan, however, and issued a stop order to the province in October 2014. Nevertheless, a re-interment ceremony was held in October 2014.
