= Nakota =

Native name of indigenous North Americans

Nakota / Nakoda / Nakona // Îyârhe "ally / friend" // "mountain"
- Person: Assiniboine: Nakóda; Stoney: Îyethka
- People: Assiniboine: Nakón Oyáde; Stoney: Îyethkabi / Îyethka Oyade
- Language: Assiniboine: (oral): Nakón Iyábi (sign): Nakón Wíyutabi; Stoney: (oral): Îyethka Îabi / wîchoîe (sign): Îyethka Wowîhâ
- Country: Assiniboine: Nakón Mąkóce; Stoney: Îyethka Makóce

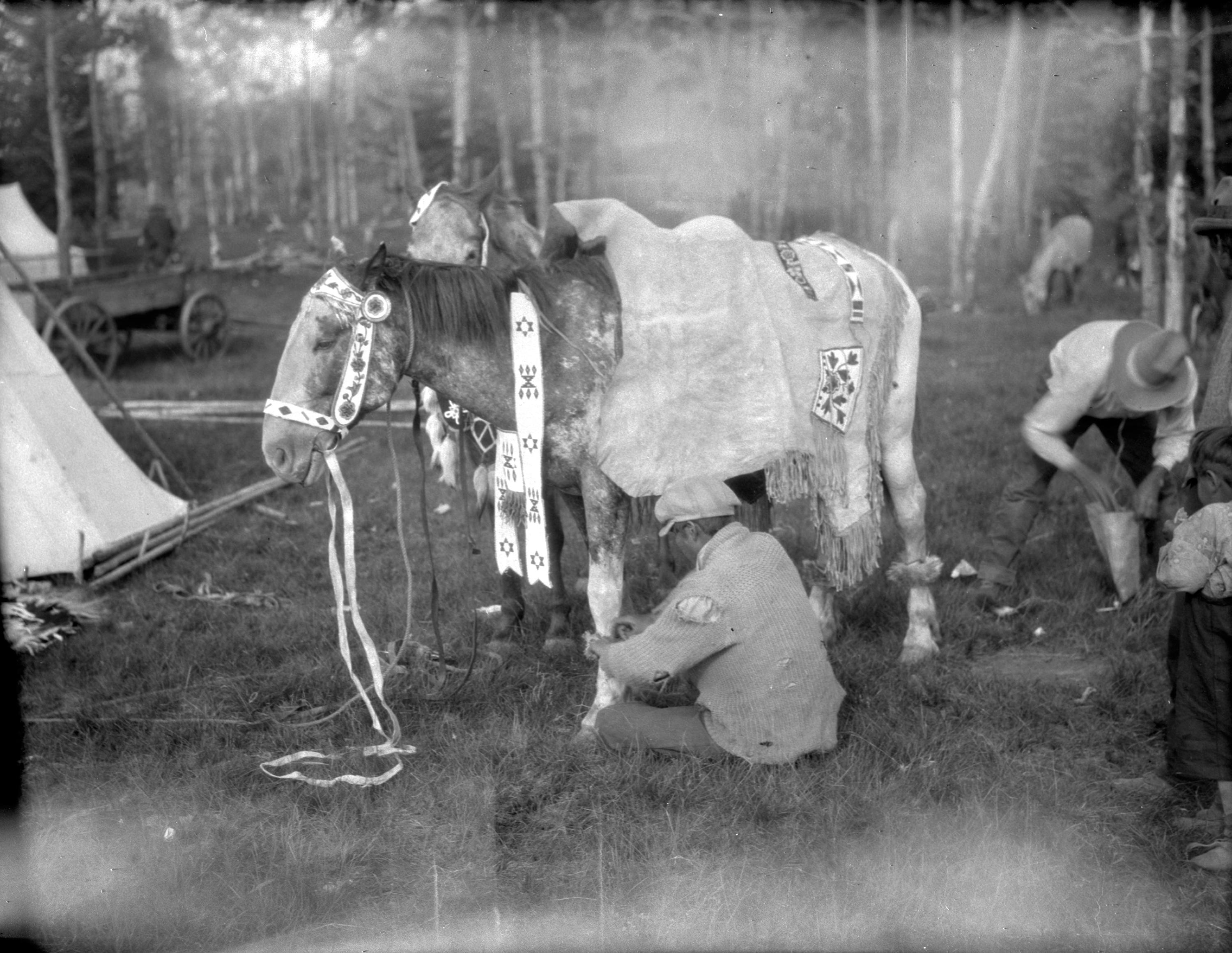
Dressing a horse for a ceremony, Nakoda summer camp near Banff, Alberta

Nakota (or Nakoda or Nakona) is the endonym used by those Native peoples of North America who usually go by the name of Assiniboine (or Hohe), in the United States, and of Stoney, in Canada.

The Assiniboine branched off from the Great Sioux Nation (aka the Oceti Sakowin) around 1640 and moved further west from the original territory in the woodlands of what is now Minnesota into the northern and northwestern regions of Montana and North Dakota in the United States, and Manitoba, Saskatchewan, and Alberta in Canada.

== Linguistic history ==
Historically, the tribes belonging to the Sioux nation known as the Oceti Sakowin (Seven Council Fires) have generally been classified into three large regional groups:

- Lakota (Thítȟuŋwaŋ; anglicized as Teton), who form the westernmost group;
- Eastern Dakota (Isáŋyathi; anglicized as Santee), consisting of the four eastern bands: Mdewakanton, Sisseton, Wahpeton, Wahpekute;
- Western Dakota (Wičhíyena), previously designated the Nakota, consisting of the two central bands: Yankton and Yanktonai.

The Assiniboine separated from the Yankton-Yanktonai grouping around 1640. All tribes of Sioux use the term Dakóta, or Lakóta, to designate those who speak one of the Dakota/Lakota dialects, except the Assiniboine. The latter include themselves under the term Nakóta.

For a long time, very few scholars criticized this classification. Among the first was the Yankton/Lakota scholar Ella Deloria.

In 1978, Douglas R. Parks, A. Wesley Jones, David S. Rood, and Raymond J. DeMallie engaged in systematic linguistic research at the Sioux and Assiniboine reservations to establish the precise dialectology of the Sioux language. They ascertained that both the Santee and the Yankton/Yanktonai referred (and refer) to themselves by the autonym Dakota. The name of Nakota (or Nakoda) was (and is) exclusive usage of the Assiniboine and of their Canadian relatives, the Stoney. The subsequent academic literature, however, especially if it is not produced by linguistic specialists, has seldom reflected Parks and DeMallie's work. The change cannot be regarded as a subsequent terminological regression caused by the fact that Yankton-Yanktonai people lived together with the Santee in the same reserves.

Currently, the groups refer to themselves as follows in their mother tongues:

- Dakota people – Dakota, Santee, Yankton and Yanktonai
- Lakota people – Lakota or Teton Sioux
- Nakota – the Assiniboine and the Stoney

== Present trends ==
Recently the Assiniboine and, especially, the Stoney have begun to minimize the historic separation from the Dakota, claiming a shared identity with the broader Sioux Nation. This can be seen on Alberta's Stoney official Internet sites, for example, in the self-designation of the Alexis Nakota Sioux First Nation, or in the claim of the Nakoda people to their Sioux ancestry and the value of their native language: "As descendants of the great Sioux nations, the Stoney tribal members of today prefer to conduct their conversation and tribal business in the Siouan mother tongue". Saskatchewan's Assiniboine and Stoney tribes also claim identification with the Sioux tradition.

The Assiniboine-Stoney tribes have supported recent "pan-Sioux" attempts to revive the native languages. Their representatives attend the annual "Lakota, Dakota, Nakota Language Summits." Since 2008, these have been sponsored by Tusweca Tiospaye (Dragonfly Community), the Lakota non-profit organization for the promotion and strengthening of the language. They promote a mission of "Uniting the Seven Council Fires to Save the Language".

== Sources ==
- Curtis, Edward Sheriff, The North American Indian : being a series of volumes picturing and describing the Indians of the United States, and Alaska (written, illustrated, and published by Edward S. Curtis; edited by Frederick Webb Hodge), Seattle, E. S. Curtis [Cambridge, Mass. : The University Press], 1907–1930, 20 v. (Northwestern University)
- DeMallie, Raymond J., "Sioux until 1850"; in Raymond J. DeMallie (ed.), Handbook of North American Indians: Plains (Vol. 13, Part 2, p. 718–760), William C. Sturtevant (Gen. Ed.), Smithsonian Institution, Washington, D.C., 2001 (ISBN 0-16-050400-7)
- Guy E. Gibbon, The Sioux: the Dakota and Lakota nations, Malden, Blackwell Publishers, 2003 (ISBN 1557865663)
- Howard, James H., The Canadian Sioux, Lincoln, University of Nebraska Press, 1984 (ISBN 0-8032-2327-7)
- Lewis, M. Paul (ed.), 2009. Ethnologue: Languages of the World, Sixteenth edition, Tex.: SIL International. Online version: http://www.ethnologue.com/
- Palmer, Jessica D., The Dakota peoples: a history of the Dakota, Lakota, and Nakota through 1863. Jefferson: McFarland & Company, Inc., Publishers, 2008 (ISBN 0786431776)
- Parks, Douglas R., DeMallie, Raymond J., "Sioux, Assiniboine and Stoney Dialects: A Classification", Anthropological Linguistics, Special Issue, Florence M. Voegelin Memorial Volume, Vol. 34:1-4 (Spring - Winter, 1992), pp. 233–255 (accessible online at JSTORE.
- Parks, Douglas R. & Rankin, Robert L., "The Siouan languages", in Raymond J. DeMallie (ed.), Handbook of North American Indians: Plains (Vol. 13, Part 1, p. 94–114), William C. Sturtevant (gen. ed.), Smithsonian Institution, Washington, 2001.
- Christopher Westhorp, Pocket guide to native Americans, Salamander Books, Londra, 1993 (ISBN 1856000230) – Italian edition consulted: Indiani. I Pellerossa Tribù per Tribù, Idealibri, Milan, 1993 (ISBN 88-7082-254-0).
