= Nakoda people =

First Nations people in Western Canada

Nakota / Nakoda // Îyârhe "ally / friend" // "mountain"
- Person: Îyethka
- People: Îyethkabi (Îyethka Oyade)
- Language: Îyethka Îabi / wîchoîe Îyethka Wowîhâ
- Country: Îyethka Makóce

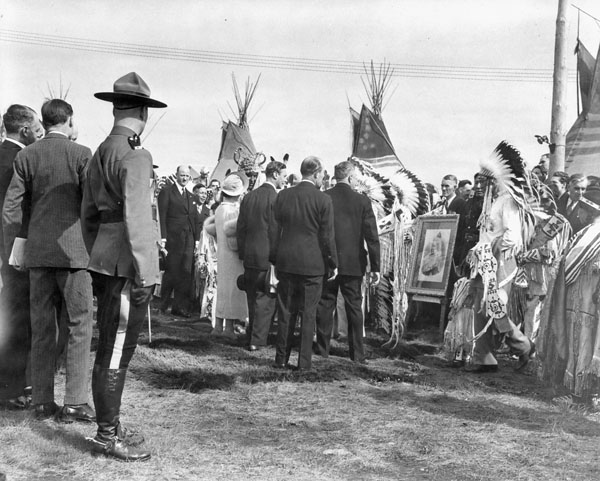
King George VI and Queen Elizabeth greet chieftains of the Nakoda, who have brought a photo of Queen Victoria, during the 1939 royal tour of Canada. The treaties were originally signed by representatives of the Crown acting in Queen Victoria's name.

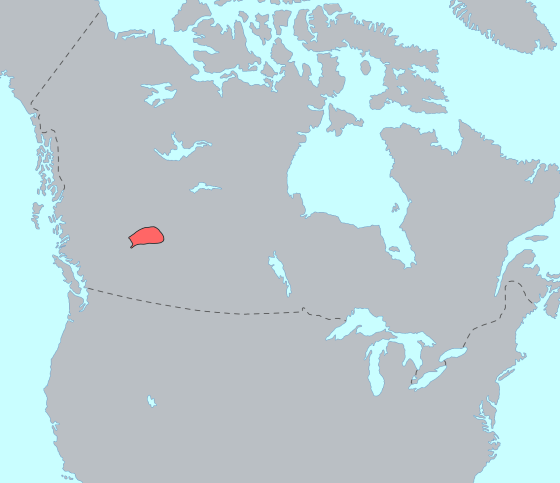
Stoney language area

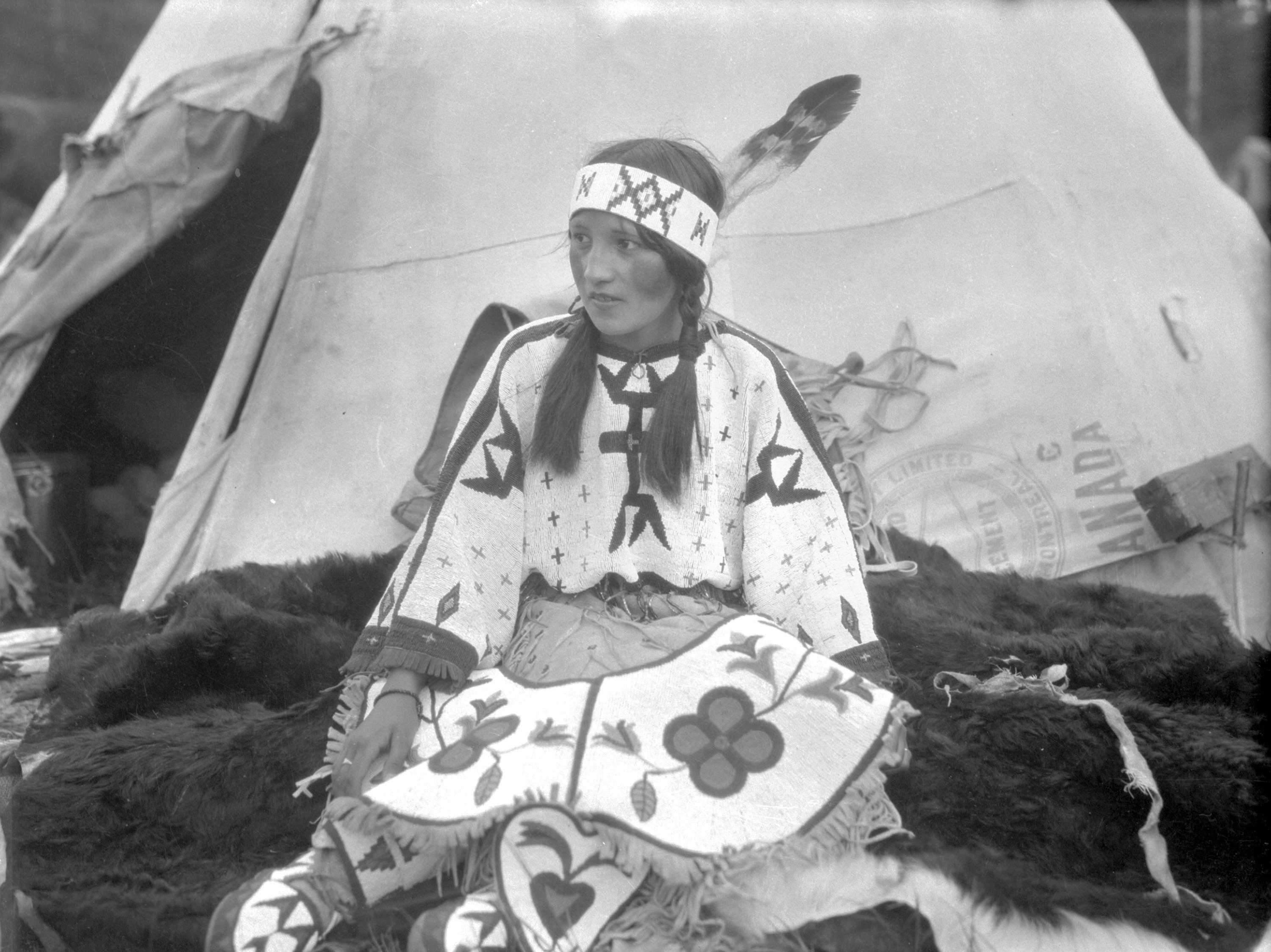
Blue Bird, Nakoda girl

The Nakoda (also known as Stoney, Îyârhe Nakoda, or Stoney Nakoda) are an Indigenous people in Western Canada and the United States.

Their territory used to be large parts of what is now Alberta, Saskatchewan, and Montana, but their reserves are now in Alberta and in Saskatchewan, where they are rarely differentiated from the Assiniboine.

They refer to themselves in their language as Nakoda, meaning 'friend, ally'. The name Stoney was given to them by Anglophone explorers, because of their technique of using fire-heated rocks to boil broth in rawhide bowls. They are very closely related to the Assiniboine, who are also known as Stone Sioux (from Ojibwe: asinii-bwaan).

The Nakoda First Nation in Alberta comprises three bands: Bearspaw, Chiniki, and Goodstoney.

The Stoney were "excluded" from Banff National Park between 1890 and 1920. In 2010 they were officially "welcomed back".

== Nakoda groups ==
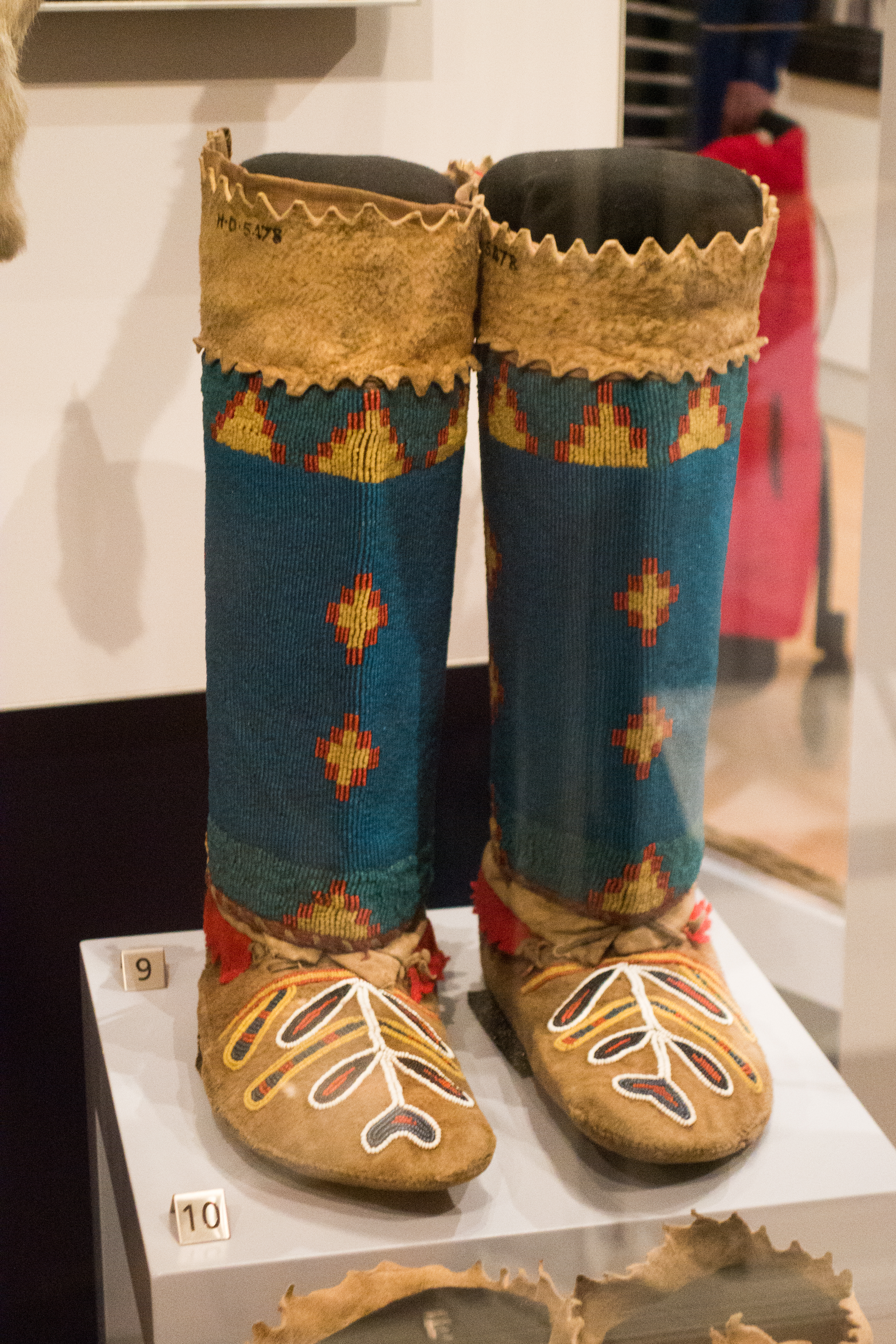
Moccasins from the Stoney Nakoda First Nation, circa 1905

The Nakoda are descendants of individual bands of the Assiniboine, from whom they spun out as an independent group in about 1744. The Nakoda was divided geographically and culturally into two tribal groups or divisions with different dialects, which in turn were further divided into several bands:

Wood Stoney (Chan Tonga Nakoda – 'Big Woods People', often called Swampy Ground Assiniboine, northern tribal group)

- Alexis' band (Stoney, Métis, Woodland Cree)
- Paul's band (Danezaa, Stoney, Woodland Cree, Iroquois)

Mountain Stoney (Ye Xa Yabine Nakoda or Hebina – 'Rock Mountain People', often called Strong Wood Assiniboine, Thickwood Assiniboine, southern tribal group)

- Sharphead's band (Chipos Ostikwan's Nakoda, Wolf Creek Stoney, or Pigeon Lake Stoney, often called Plains Assiniboine) (Stoney, Métis)
- Stoney Nakoda First Nation, Comprising the three following bands:
  1. Wesley's (Goodstoney's) band (Stoney, Plains Cree, Métis)
  2. Chiniki's band (Métis, Stoney, Plains Cree)
  3. Bearspaw's band (Stoney, Cree)

== Treaties ==
Members of the Nakoda nations of Paul and Alexis signed an adhesion to Treaty 6 in 1877.

In 1877, representatives of the Nakoda Nations of Bearspaw, Chiniki, and Goodstoney met with representatives of the British Crown to discuss the terms of Treaty 7. In exchange for the use of traditional lands, the Crown agreed to honour their right to self-government and an ancestral way of life. They were also promised reserve lands, 279 km^{2} situated along the Bow River between the Kananaskis River and the Ghost River, which became the Big Horn, Stoney, and Eden Valley reserves, shared between the Bearspaw, Chiniki, and Goodstoney tribes.

== See also ==
- Sioux language
- Nakota
- First Nations in Alberta
- List of Indian reserves in Alberta
