= Mînî Thnî =

Mînî Thnî Morley
- First Nations settlement
- Location of Mînî Thnî in Alberta
- Coordinates: 51.16153°N 114.85095°W
- Country: Canada
- Province: Alberta
- Census division: No. 15
- Municipal district: Municipal District of Bighorn No. 8

Government
  - Type: Unincorporated
- Elevation: 1,240 m (4,070 ft)
- Time zone: UTC−06:00 (Alberta Time)
- Postal code: T0L 1N0

Mînî Thnî (Stoney: [mĩ'nĩ θnĩ]; lit. 'Cold Water', formerly known as Morley) is a First Nations settlement within the Stoney 142/143/144 Indian reserve in southern Alberta, Canada. It is located along the Canadian Pacific Kansas City railway between the Trans-Canada Highway and the Bow River, upstream from Ghost Lake. It has an elevation of 1,240 metres (4,070 ft). The settlement is located in census division No. 15 and in the federal riding of Yellowhead. The settlement and the Indian reserve are part of the Stoney Nation.

The historic McDougall Memorial United Church is located a few miles from Mînî Thnî. Built in 1875, it was southern Alberta's oldest surviving Protestant church and the oldest remaining structure in the Bow Valley, it was damaged by fire on May 22, 2017. Restoration is almost complete as of 2021. It was once a part of Morleyville, the oldest pioneer settlement in southern Alberta and home to its first herd of breeding cattle. Founded by the Methodist missionary George McDougall and his sons as a missionary outpost, Morleyville existed until 1921 when a new church was built in the present settlement of Mînî Thnî, which had developed around the Morley Indian Agency building. The old church is now a provincial historic site. Other milestones in the settlement's history include the construction in 1920 of the first airport established by Canada's Air Board and the 1969 establishment of Canada's first magistrate's court to be held in a First Nations–owned building on First Nations land.

== History ==
Settlement in the Mînî Thnî area began with First Nations. The arrival of the Methodist missionary John McDougall and his wife in 1873 to establish a missionary outpost in the Bow Valley for outreach to the Nakoda (Stoney) and Siksika (Blackfoot) First Nations. They founded the mission at the request of John's father, George McDougall, the superintendent of Methodist missionary work in Western Canada. The site John chose was originally called Ghost River, but he renamed it Morleyville in honour of his friend Morley Punshon, an Ontario doctor.

John McDougall and his wife began their work by constructing a two-room log shack with a sod roof for themselves and a small church. Shortly thereafter, the McDougalls moved their fledgling outpost to a new site to the south, closer to the river. In 1875, they built a larger church with the help of George McDougall and Andrew Sibbald, a carpenter and teacher. Logs and boards laboriously fashioned from local timber with a whipsaw were used to build the one-room church. Aside from the framed gable ends, the exterior surface of the log walls remained unfinished, but the interior surfaces were daubed with mud and painted white, except for the panelled end walls. Around 1900, the log walls were covered with board-and-batten siding, and a steeple was built. It is southern Alberta's oldest remaining Protestant church, the oldest remaining structure in the Bow Valley, and is the province's earliest example of a building constructed in the carpenter gothic style still standing at the place of its original construction.

David McDougall later joined his brother John at Morleyville and helped to found the Indian Trading Post. In its early days, some seven hundred First Nations people visited the post to barter animal skins for food, blankets, stockings, and prints. The homes and the trading post were enclosed by a stockade of heavy logs erected to provide defence in case a party of First Nations warriors attempted a raid. The outpost became a hub for settlers coming into the Bow Valley and reached a population of over two hundred at its peak; Morleyville was southern Alberta's first pioneer settlement. A school and orphanage were built, along with missionary residences, barns and corrals. Southern Alberta's first herd of breeding cattle supplied Morleyville's residents with meat and milk. Sibbald, one of Alberta's first trained teachers, taught at the school.

An Indian residential school was operated by Methodists in Mînî Thnî from 1886 until 1949. School records indicate that student Evelyn Pocette died there on December 31, 1934, then Susan Two Young Men on June 7, 1935, Annie Hunter on June 16, 1935, Mary Dixon (Morley) on July 6, 1935, and White Bright Star on February 13, 1938. Amos Lefthand died October 17, 1942, Leta Powderface ca. May 14, 1943, then Charlie Amos ca. August 1, 1943, and Isaiah Powerface December 26, 1947. A school textbook was published for teaching English to the students residing there. This textbook makes reference to Morley and McDougall.

Morleyville's early prominence declined in the 1880s after the Canadian Pacific transcontinental railroad bypassed the settlement as it was routed through the valley on the opposite side of the Bow River. John McDougall and his wife remained there until their retirement to Calgary in 1898. The church remained in use until 1921, when it was replaced by a new church located a few miles away at a First Nations settlement that developed around an Indian Agency building. This newer settlement is the present-day Mînî Thnî. The old settlement and its church stood abandoned until volunteers affiliated with the United Church of Canada formed the Morley Church Restoration Society. Work was completed in 1952, and the restored church continues to be used for weddings and special occasions. The building has been declared a provincial historic site and is listed in the Canadian Register of Historic Places; a historical marker at the site describes its significance. The McDougall Stoney Mission Society maintains the church and the surrounding 50 acres (0.20 km^{2}) of ecologically significant native prairie that has never been disturbed by agriculture.

The first airport and test station to be established by Canada's Air Board began operation at Mînî Thnî in 1920. Known as the Morley Air Station, it was equipped with six Airco DH.9A aircraft used for aerial reconnaissance of Banff National Park, forestry ranging in the Rocky Mountain Foothills, and aerial firefighting.

In 1969, Mînî Thnî hosted the first magistrate's court in Canada to be held in a First Nations-owned building located on First Nations land.

In August 2024, Morley was renamed Mînî Thnî by the Stoney Nakoda First Nations.

== Notable people ==
- John W. Niddrie, early pioneer and religious leader

== See also ==
- George McDougall
- Nakoda people
- List of communities in Alberta
