= John W. Niddrie =

John W. Niddrie (September 24, 1863 – May 4, 1940) was a Canadian pioneer and missionary during the early years of the European colonization of Canada. He moved to Canada from Scotland. His memoirs were collected in a book titled Niddrie of the North-West. University of Alberta Press published the book.
