= Eden Valley 216 =

Coordinates: 50°26′10″N 114°25′34″W

- Indian reserve
- Eden Valley Indian Reserve No. 216
- Location in Alberta
- First Nations: Stoney Nakoda: Bearspaw; Chiniki; Wesley
- Country: Canada
- Province: Alberta
- Municipal district: Foothills

Area
  - Land: 17.65 km^{2} (6.81 sq mi)

Population (2016)
  - Total: 596
  - Density: 33.8/km^{2} (88/sq mi)
- Time zone: UTC−06:00 (Alberta Time)
- Website: edenvalleyreserve.ca

Eden Valley 216 is an Indian reserve of the Stoney Nakoda First Nation, comprising Bearspaw, Chiniki, and Wesley First Nations, located near Longview, Alberta.
