= Stoney language =

Siouan language spoken in Alberta, Canada

Stoney
- Nakoda
- Nakoda, Nakota, Isga, Îyethka Îabi, Îyethka wîchoîe, Isga Iʔabi
- Native to: Canada
- Region: Alberta
- Ethnicity: Nakota: Stoney
- Native speakers: 930 (2021)
- Language family: Siouan: Western Siouan; Mississippi Valley Siouan; Dakotan; Nakoda; Stoney

Language codes
- ISO 639-3: sto
- Glottolog: ston1242
- ELP: Stoney
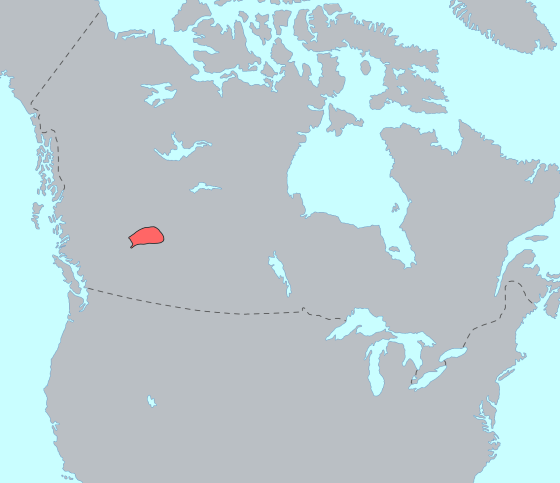
- The location of Stoney / Nakoda

- Stoney is classified as Vulnerable by the UNESCO Atlas of the World's Languages in Danger.

Nakota / Nakoda // Îyârhe "ally / friend" // "mountain"
- Person: Îyethka
- People: Îyethkabi (Îyethka Oyade)
- Language: Îyethka Îabi / wîchoîe Îyethka Wowîhâ
- Country: Îyethka Makóce

Stoney—also called Nakota or Nakoda, Isga [ˈiʃɡɑ] (in the Alexis dialect) or Îyethka [ĩˈjes̪kə] (in the Mînî Thnî dialect), and formerly Alberta Assiniboine—is a member of the Dakota subgroup of the Mississippi Valley grouping of the Siouan languages. The Dakotan languages constitute a dialect continuum consisting of Santee-Sisseton (Dakota), Yankton-Yanktonai (Dakota), Teton (Lakota), Assiniboine, and Stoney.

== Number of speakers ==
Stoney is the most linguistically divergent of the Dakotan dialects and has been described as "on the verge of becoming a separate language." The Stoneys are the only Siouan people that live entirely in Canada, and the Stoney language is spoken by five groups in Alberta.

No official language survey has been undertaken for every community where Stoney is spoken, but the language may be spoken by as many as a few thousand people, primarily at the Mînî Thnî community (renamed from Morley in 2024). The 1996 Canadian census recorded 2,800 people as having Stoney as their first language. At that time, it was spoken as a first language by people over the age of about twenty-five in the Alexis and St Paul bands, but younger people were growing up speaking English. In Morley, however, children were still speaking Stoney.

In 2016, the number of first-language Stoney-speakers was reported as 3,050, but the Stoney population had risen by 1,800 over the same period, indicating a relative decline in the number of Stoney-speakers. In 2026, Deanna Two Young Men, a teacher of the language at Nakoda Elementary School in Mînî Thnî, reported that "many students have minimal knowledge of the Stoney language. They can understand it, but they can’t speak it". She was actively engaged in revitalizing the language.

== Relationship to Assiniboine ==
Stoney's closest linguistic relative is Assiniboine. The two have often been confused with each other due to their close historical and linguistic relationship, but they are not mutually intelligible. Stoney either developed from Assiniboine, or both Stoney and Assiniboine developed from a common ancestor language.

Ullrich considers Stoney and Assiniboine distinct languages, saying "The Nakoda language spoken by the Assiniboine is not intelligible to Lakota and Dakota speakers, unless they have been exposed to it extensively. The Stoney form of the Nakoda language is completely unintelligible to Lakota and Dakota speakers. As such, the two Nakoda languages cannot be considered dialects of the Lakota and Dakota language."

== Phonology ==
Very little linguistic documentation and descriptive research has been done on Stoney. However, Stoney varieties demonstrate broad phonological similarity with some important divergences.

=== Mînî Thnî Dialect ===
For example, the following phonemes are reportedly found in Mînî Thnî Stoney, spoken primarily in Mînî Thnî.

==== Consonants ====
Mînî Thnî Stoney consonants
		Bilabial	Dental/ Alveolar	Palatal (-alveolar)	Velar	Pharyngeal	Glottal
Nasal		m ⟨m⟩	n ⟨n⟩				
Plosive/ Affricate	voiceless	p ⟨p⟩	t ⟨t⟩	t͡ʃ ⟨ch⟩	k ⟨k⟩		ʔ ⟨'⟩
Plosive/ Affricate	voiced	b ⟨b⟩	d ⟨d⟩	d͡ʒ ⟨j⟩	ɡ ⟨g⟩		ʔ ⟨'⟩
Fricative	voiceless		s̪ ~ θ ⟨th⟩	ʃ ⟨s⟩		ħ ⟨rh⟩	h ⟨h⟩
Fricative	voiced		z̪ ~ ð ⟨ṯẖ⟩	ʒ ⟨z⟩			
Approximant		w ⟨w⟩		j ⟨y⟩		ʕ̞ ⟨r⟩	

==== Vowels ====
		Front	Central	Back
Close/High	oral	i ⟨i⟩		u ⟨u⟩
Close/High	nasal	ĩ ⟨î⟩		ũ ⟨û⟩
Mid	oral	e (ɛ) ⟨e⟩	(ə)	o ⟨o⟩
Open/Low	oral			ɑ ⟨a⟩, ɑː ⟨aa⟩
Open/Low	nasal			ɑ̃ ⟨â⟩, ɑ̃ː ⟨ââ⟩

=== Alexis Dialect ===
For comparison, these phonemes reportedly characterize the Stoney spoken at Alexis Nakota Sioux Nation, which maintains the common Siouan three-way contrast between plain, aspirated, and ejective stops:

Alexis Stoney consonants
		Bilabial	Dental/ Alveolar	Palatal (-alveolar)	Velar	Glottal
Nasal		m ⟨m⟩	n ⟨n⟩			
Plosive/ Affricate	plain	p ⟨b⟩	t ⟨d⟩	t͡ʃ ⟨j⟩	k ⟨g⟩	ʔ ⟨ʔ⟩
Plosive/ Affricate	aspirated	pʰ ⟨p⟩	tʰ ⟨t⟩	t͡ʃʰ ⟨c⟩	kʰ ⟨k⟩	ʔ ⟨ʔ⟩
Plosive/ Affricate	ejective	pʼ ⟨p'⟩	tʼ ⟨t'⟩	t͡ʃʼ ⟨c'⟩	kʼ ⟨k'⟩	ʔ ⟨ʔ⟩
Fricative	voiceless		s ~ θ ⟨s⟩	ʃ ⟨sh⟩	x ⟨x⟩	h ⟨h⟩
Fricative	voiced		z ~ ð ⟨z⟩	ʒ ⟨zh⟩	ɣ ⟨r⟩	
Approximant		w ⟨w⟩		j ⟨y⟩		

Notice that Alexis Stoney, for example, has innovated contrastive vowel length, which is not found in other Dakotan dialects. Alexis Stoney also has long and nasal mid vowels:

Alexis Stoney vowels
	Front	Central	Back
High	i, iː, ĩ		u, uː, ũ
Mid	e, eː, ẽ		o, oː, õ
Low		a, aː, ã	

=== Stress ===
Stress placement in Stoney is not predictable, and is phonemic, but is not marked in regular spelling. Thus ⟨hâbi⟩, when stressed on the first syllable ('hɑ̃bĩ), means "standing, they stand", but when stressed on the second (hɑ̃'bĩ) means "juice". The addition of extra syllables through inflexion, prefixation and suffixation can also cause stress to move: thus ⟨wîyâ⟩ ("woman") is stressed on the first syllable, but ⟨wîyâbi⟩ ("women") is stressed on the second.

According to Corrie Erdman, "Dakota languages characteristically realize stress on the second syllable and do not generate secondary stress. In Stoney, however, primary stress is predominantly realized on the penultimate syllable and secondary stress exhibits an alternating pattern applying from right to left. Lexically marked morphemes obstruct the predictabIe pattern of Stoney stress by suspending the alternating patten and averting the realizaton of penultimate stress to the final syiiable. Additionally, Stoney has a number of affixes that do not bear stress. These affixes cause further variation in the realization of stress and make developing a unified acount of Stoney stress a complicated task". Moreover, the stress-placement rules of Alexis Stoney differ significantly from Mînî Thnî Stoney.

== Syntax ==
The usual word-order in Stoney sentences is subject-object-verb, but this order is not obligatory. As of 2023, "very little basic documentation and description has been carried out on the language beyond the lexical level", but a language corpus had been established as a step towards syntactic and morphological description.

== Writing system ==
Systematic work to establish a Stoney writing system began in 1965, when the Stoney Tribal Council collaborated with the Summer Institute of Linguistics (specifically Warren Harbeck) and the elder J. R. Twoyoungmen to establish a system. Stoney families and students of what was then Morley school, at all grade levels, were consulted, and both Latin letters and Cree syllabics were considered as a basis for the system. The book The Stoney Alphabet, with drawings by Jawn C. Poucette, was published in 1970. Stoney-language writing and learning materials were further developed during the 1970s by the Stoney Cultural Education Program and in the 1980s by the Stoney Indian Language Project.

Stoney alphabet (Stoney Nakoda First Nation)

- a
- (aa)
- â
- (ââ)
- b
- ch
- d
- e
- g
- h
- i
- î
- j
- k
- m
- n
- o
- (ô)
- p
- r
- rh
- s
- t
- th
- ṯẖ
- u
- û
- w
- y
- z
- (')

Note:

- Vowel lengthening is relatively rare in Mînî Thnî Stoney. When two vowels occur in sequence, they are normally broken up with a predictable glottal stop. To distinguish between /ɑː/ and /ɑʔɑ/, three new letters have been proposed: ⟨aa⟩, ⟨ââ⟩, and ⟨'⟩.

Stoney alphabet (Alexis Nakota Sioux First Nation)

- a
- â
- aa
- b
- c
- c'
- d
- e
- ê
- ee
- g
- h
- i
- î
- ii
- j
- k
- k'
- m
- n
- o
- ô
- oo
- p
- p'
- r
- s
- sh
- t
- t'
- u
- û
- uu
- w
- x
- y
- z
- zh
- ʔ

== Word set (includes numbers) ==
- One — Wazhi
- Two — Nûm
- Three — Yamnî
- Four — Ktusa
- Five — Zaptâ
- Man — Wîca
- Woman — Wîyâ
- Sun — Wa
- Moon — Hâwi
- Water — Mini

== Phonetic differences from other Dakotan languages ==
The following table shows some of the main phonetic differences between Stoney, Assiniboine, and the three dialects (Lakota, Yankton-Yanktonai and Santee-Sisseton) of Sioux.

Sioux					Nakota		
Lakota	Western Dakota		Eastern Dakota		Assiniboine	Stoney	gloss
	Yanktonai	Yankton	Sisseton	Santee			
Lakȟóta	Dakȟóta		Dakhóta		Nakhóta	Nakhóda	self-designation
lowáŋ	dowáŋ		dowáŋ		nowáŋ		'to sing'
ló	dó		dó		nó		'assertion'
čísčila	čísčina		čístina		čúsina	čúsin	'small'
hokšíla	hokšína		hokšína	hokšída	hokšína	hokšín	'boy'
gnayáŋ	gnayáŋ	knayáŋ	hnayáŋ		knayáŋ	hna	'to deceive'
glépa	gdépa	kdépa	hdépa		knépa	hnéba	'to vomit'
kigná	kigná	kikná	kihná		kikná	gihná	'to soothe'
slayá	sdayá		sdayá		snayá	snayá	'to grease'
wičháša	wičháša		wičhášta		wičhášta	wičhá	'man'
kibléza	kibdéza		kibdéza		kimnéza	gimnéza	'to sober up'
yatkáŋ	yatkáŋ		yatkáŋ		yatkáŋ	yatkáŋ	'to drink'
hé	hé		hé		žé	žé	'that'
