= Stoney 142, 143, 144 =

Indian reserve in Canada

Coordinates: 51°09′N 114°56′W

- Indian reserve
- Stoney Indian Reserve Nos. 142, 143, and 144
- Boundaries of Stoney 142, 143, 144

- Location in Alberta
- First Nations: Stoney Nakoda: Bearspaw; Chiniki; Wesley
- Treaty: 7
- Country: Canada
- Province: Alberta
- Municipal districts: Bighorn No. 8 Rocky View County

Area
  - Total: 39,264.5 ha (97,025 acres)

Population (2016)
  - Total: 3,713
  - Density: 9.456/km^{2} (24.49/sq mi)
- Time zone: UTC−06:00 (Alberta Time)

Stoney 142, 143, 144 is an Indian reserve of the Stoney Nakoda First Nation, comprising Bearspaw, Chiniki, and Wesley First Nations in Alberta, located between the Municipal District of Bighorn No. 8 and Rocky View County. The largest community of the Nakoda people, it is 56 kilometres west of Calgary.

The community is spread along both sides of the Trans-Canada Highway, east of Banff National Park and north of Kananaskis Improvement District. In addition to Kananaskis, it is also bordered by Bighorn No. 8, Rocky View County, and the town of Cochrane. By land area, it is the third-largest Indian reserve in Canada (after Blood 148 and Siksika 146, both also in Alberta).

According to the Canada 2011 Census:

- Population: 3,494
- % Change (1996–2001): 0.7
- % Change (2001–2011): 38.16
- Dwellings: 795
- Area (km^{2}): 444.94
- Density (persons per km^{2}): 7.85

== History ==
Most of the film Buffalo Bill and the Indians, or Sitting Bull's History Lesson was shot on location on the reserve. Frank "Sitting Wind" Kaquitts, who played Sitting Bull in the film, had been elected the first ever chief of Alberta's Nakoda (Stoney) First Nation, after three bands had amalgamated the year before. Kevin Costner's Open Range was also filmed on the reserve. The film Little Big Man starring Dustin Hoffman and Chief Dan George was shot here also, and the first screening was held in Calgary so the tribe could attend.

The Stoney Reserve was badly damaged by a massive flood in June 2013 and hundreds of residents were evacuated from their homes.

== See also ==
- Nakoda (Stoney)
