= National Register of Historic Places listings in Blaine County, Montana =

Location of Blaine County in Montana

This is a list of the National Register of Historic Places listings in Blaine County, Montana. It is intended to be a complete list of the properties and districts on the National Register of Historic Places in Blaine County, Montana, United States. The locations of National Register properties and districts for which the latitude and longitude coordinates are included below, may be seen in a map.

There are 10 properties and districts listed on the National Register in the county.

This National Park Service list is complete through NPS recent listings posted October 16, 2026.

== Listings county-wide ==
	Name on the Register	Image	Date listed	Location	City or town	Description
1	Chief Joseph Battleground of the Bear's Paw	Chief Joseph Battleground of the Bear's Paw	October 6, 1970 (#70000355)	About 15 miles south of Chinook, T30NR19E, Sections 1 and 12; 48°22′39″N 109°12′26″W	Chinook	
2	Cow Creek Skirmish Historic District	Cow Creek Skirmish Historic District	June 28, 2019 (#100004104)	Address restricted	Winifred vicinity	
3	Cow Island Landing Skirmish Site	Cow Island Landing Skirmish Site	June 27, 2019 (#100004103)	Approx. 28 mi. NE of Winifred; 47°46′25″N 108°56′57″W	Winifred vicinity	
4	Dave's Texaco	Dave's Texaco	August 16, 1994 (#94000862)	237 Pennsylvania St. 48°35′35″N 109°13′54″W	Chinook	
5	Ervin Homestead-Gist Bottom Historic District	Ervin Homestead-Gist Bottom Historic District	June 23, 2016 (#16000410)	River Mile 122.3 Left; 47°48′18″N 109°00′40″W	Hays vicinity	Ranch homesteaded beside Missouri River in Missouri Breaks
6	Lodgepole Community Hall		February 24, 2000 (#00000148)	Fort Belknap Indian Community; 48°02′04″N 108°31′57″W	Lodgepole	
7	Lohman Block	Lohman Block	March 19, 1980 (#80002399)	239-225 Indiana St. 48°35′35″N 109°13′49″W	Chinook	
8	St. Paul's Mission Church		July 31, 2020 (#100005403)	1 Mission Dr. 47°58′35″N 108°40′30″W	Hays	
9	Anna Scherlie Homestead Shack		November 5, 1998 (#98001338)	Montana Highway 241, south of the Canada–US border 48°51′01″N 108°23′26″W	Turner	
10	Young Brothers Chevrolet Garage	Young Brothers Chevrolet Garage	August 16, 1994 (#94000867)	201 Pennsylvania St. 48°35′38″N 109°13′54″W	Chinook	

== See also ==
- List of National Historic Landmarks in Montana
- National Register of Historic Places listings in Montana
