= Clarena Brockie =

American politician

Member of the Montana House of Representatives from the 32nd district
- In office January 7, 2013 – January 5, 2015
- Preceded by: Tony Belcourt
- Succeeded by: Bruce Meyers

Personal details
- Born: 1949 (age 76–77) Havre, Montana
- Party: Democratic
- Education: Montana State University–Northern; University of Arizona

Clarena Brockie (born 1949, in Havre, Montana) was a Democratic member of the Montana House of Representatives who represents the 32nd District. She defeated former Representative Tony Belcourt by three votes, 371 to 368, in the 2012 election. She was defeated in 2014 by Bruce Meyers.

== Political career ==
Brockie first entered politics in 2012 standing for the 32nd district of the Montana House of Representative. She stood against incumbent Representative Tony Belcourt. In the Democratic primary election, Brockie won with a majority of 3 votes with her getting 371 to Belcourt's 368. Belcourt demanded a recount in five counties. Due to the difference being more than the requirement for a free recount, Belcourt had to put up a $664.47 bond in each county. After the recount, the results were unchanged and Brockie was nominated as the Democratic nominee. Due to the Republican Party or any third party not putting up a candidate, Brockie was declared elected in an uncontested election.

During her term in the House, she oversaw the introduction of bison to the Native American reservations within her district. In the 2014 election, she faced off against Republican G. Bruce Meyers. Meyers unseated Brockie by 711 to 671 votes.

== Personal life ==
Brockie received a Bachelor's degree from Northern Montana College (now Montana State University–Northern) and a Master's degree from the University of Arizona. She resides in Hays, Montana, on the Fort Belknap Indian Reservation, and serves as Dean of Student Affairs at Aaniiih Nakoda College having previously served as a tribal college administrator at Fort Belknap Indian Community College. She is a Native American.

== See also ==
- List of Native American politicians
- Native American women in politics
