= Minerva Allen =

Assiniboine poet, educator and linguist (1934–2024)

- Sunk’ Pa (Muskrat)
- Born: Minerva Crantz; April 24, 1934; Big Warm, Montana
- Died: May 24, 2024, Age 90
- Citizenship: Assiniboine and Sioux Tribes of the Fort Peck Indian Reservation, United States
- Education: Central Michigan University, BS Education; MSU-Northern, MA Counseling
- Employer(s): Hays/Lodgepole Schools, Aaniiih Nakoda College
- Known for: Poetry and Educator of Indian America
- Notable work: Vanishing Braves (1987), Spirits Rest (1981), Inktomi and the Ducks (1986), Stories by Our Elders: The Fort Belknap People (1983), Nakoda Sky People (2012)
- Spouse: John “Boogie” Allen (married 1951)
- Children: 8, and 6 adopted
- Parents: Ernest Crantz Sr. (French – Chipewyan) (father); Felistis Chopwood (Assiniboine – Gros Ventre) (mother)

Minerva Crantz Allen (Assiniboine: Sunk' Pa, April 24, 1934 – May 24, 2024) was a poet, educator and elder and citizen of the Assiniboine tribe. She advocated for Native American education and was the author of Spirits Rest (1981) and five other works of poetry. She served as the director of the Lodge Pole Senior Center and was a Native American champion at Montana State University.

== Early life and education ==
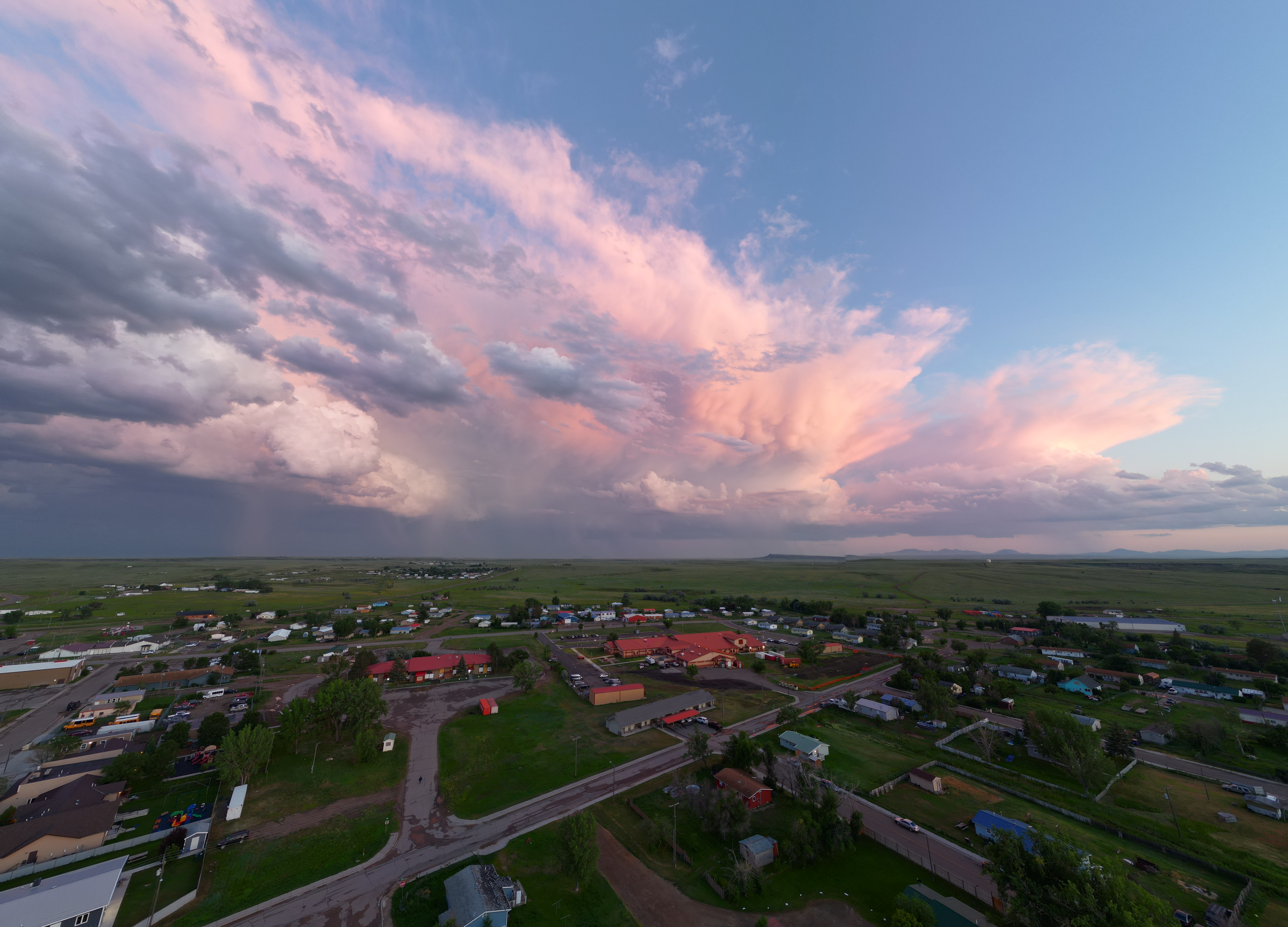
Overview of the Fort Belknap Indian Reservation where Allen resided for the majority of her life.

Allen was born on April 24, 1934 in Big Warm, located in north central Montana. Her father Ernest Crantz Sr. was of French Chipewyan descent and her mother Felistis Chopwood was born an Assiniboine – Gros Ventre. After her birth, Allen was taken outside and held up to the sun to be blessed with life and children in the future. Allen was sent to live with her grandparents due to Assiniboine customs where she lived traditionally to the culture, and Assiniboine and Gros Ventre were her first languages. Allen grew up in the traditional lodge culture of the Gros Ventre and Assinboine people on the Fort Belknap Reservation, spending the cold Montana winters in lodges insulated by pine branches and animal hides. A fire pit in the middle of the lodge kept the lodge warm, and the children would be entertained by the custom of storytelling, which would leave a considerable impact on her. She learned the custom of storytelling from her grandmother, mother and aunts, and would eventually pass her own stories down to her descendants and others through her poetry. Her grandfather encouraged her to pursue education and at six years old, Allen began school. She learned to speak English from missionaries. She began studies at Flandreau Indian School and then continued to Northern Montana College (MSU-Northern). She received a BS in Education at Central Michigan University and earned a Master's degree in counselling at MSU-Northern. Allen additionally received a MAT in early childhood education from Weber State College.

== Career ==
=== Educator ===
After her studies, Allen would spend many years as a teacher and educator, and taught for twenty years in different grades of the Hays Lodge Pole School District. She specialized in early childhood education, and trained other educators in addition to her teaching. In 1969, she brought the Head Start program to the Fort Belknap reservation. In 1975, she pioneered a program to bring elders into schools to share their history and culture with the community's youth.

Later, she began teaching at Aaniiih Nakoda College, where she would teach history and American Indian culture. Her courses covered a broad landscape of cultural knowledge, from traditional medicine to how stars were used to guide the way at night. In addition to teaching, Allen served on the board of directors at Aaniiih Nakoda College, Bilingual Director and Federal Programs Director at the Hays Lodge Pole School District, and President of the Montana Bilingual Education Association.

=== Poet and knowledge holder ===
Allen felt a strong responsibility to share and pass on her knowledge of Assiniboine customs and language to others. Following in the storytelling traditions of Allen's childhood, poetry came easy to her. She would begin to write poetry as a young child, on scraps of paper to conquer the loneliness she felt as a young child raised by her grandparents. Her poems reflected her experience and that of her people. One of Allen's favorite stories was that of Inkdomi, an Assiniboine trickster. The character appears in several of Allen's works. In 1974, she published her first book of poetry, Like spirits of the past trying to break out and walk to the west. She would write five more books of poetry, Vanishing Braves (1987), Spirits Rest (1981), Inktomi and the Ducks (1986), Stories by Our Elders: The Fort Belknap People (1983) and Nakoda Sky People (2012), as well as contribute poetry to other compilations. In 2013, Nakoda Sky People was recognized as a finalist in poetry at the High Plains Book Awards.

Allen would also share her knowledge of the Gros Ventre and Assiniboine languages and customs with scholars and academics to preserve them, as well as the stories of her people and the traditional medicines and plants they would use. As director of the Lodge Pole Senior Center, she would invite Montana State University Nursing students to the Fort Belknap reservation to spend the day with residents, learning traditional medicine and lifeways of the residents there. In 2016 she was recognized by the U.S. House of Representatives with an official "Tribute to Minerva Crantz Allen" after receiving an award for her work preserving the language of her elders. In 2020, she worked with ethnobotanists at the Bureau of Land Management to restore native seeds and grasslands across Montana. Using her knowledge of the landscape, and the uses of certain plants by the Assiniboine people, she was able to advise scientists on the types of seeds to use and locations to plant them in order to restore the landscape.

== Personal life and death ==
Allen married John Allen in 1951 and the couple shared eight children. They additionally adopted six more, and were involved in raising many others from their community. Allen's son, John Allen Jr., has followed in her footsteps as a Assiniboine spiritual leader and healer, using medicinal knowledge he learned from his mother.

Allen died at age 90 on 24 May 2024.

== Publications ==
- Like spirits of the past trying to break out and walk to the west (1974)
- Spirits Rest (1981)
- Stories by Our Elders: The Fort Belknap People (1983)
- Inktomi and the Ducks (1986) ISBN 978-0531070444
- Vanishing Braves (1987)
- Nakoda Sky People (2012) ISBN 9780979581854
