= Lodgepole =

Lodgepole can refer to:

Towns or cities

- Lodgepole, Alberta, a hamlet in Canada
- Lodge Pole, Montana, census-designated place in the United States
- Lodgepole, Nebraska, a village in the United States
- Lodgepole, South Dakota, an unincorporated community in the United States

Species

- Lodgepole chipmunk, a species of rodent
- Lodgepole pine a species of tree

Creeks or lakes

- Lodgepole Creek, a creek within Colorado, Nebraska and Wyoming in the United States
- Lodgepole Lake, a lake in Idaho, United States

Other

- Lodgepole (sculpture), a sculpture by Lyman Kipp
- Lodgepole Community Hall, a National Registered Historic Place
