= KGVA =

Coordinates: 48.188°N 108.711°W

- Fort Belknap Agency, Montana; United States
- Frequency: 88.1 MHz (HD Radio)

Programming
- Format: Public radio
- Affiliations: NPR; Native Voice One; National Federation of Community Broadcasters

Ownership
- Owner: Aaniiih Nakoda College

History
- First air date: 1952
- Call sign meaning: Gros-Ventre and Assinibione tribes

Technical information
- Licensing authority: FCC
- Facility ID: 22805
- Class: C1
- ERP: 95,000 watts
- HAAT: 243 meters

Links
- Public license information: Public file; LMS

KGVA (88.1 FM), is a public radio station in Fort Belknap Agency, Montana, serving residents of the Fort Belknap Indian Reservation. Programming on KGVA consists of local programming, including native, oldies, Top 40 and Adult Contemporary music, plus programs from NPR and Native Voice One.
