= Fort Belknap =

Fort Belknap may refer to:

- Fort Belknap Agency, Montana
- Fort Belknap Indian Reservation, Indian reservation shared by the A'aninin (Gros Ventre) and the Nakoda (Assiniboine) in north-central Montana
- Fort Belknap (Texas), a historic fort in Texas
