= Winter in the Blood =

Novel by James Welch

- First edition
- Author: James Welch
- Language: English
- Genre: Fiction
- Published: 1974 Harper & Row
- Publication place: United States
- Media type: Hardcover, paperback, ebook

Winter in the Blood is the debut novel of James Welch. It was published by Harper and Row's Native American Publishing Program in 1974. Set on the Fort Belknap Indian Reservation in north-central Montana during the late 1960s, Winter in the Blood follows a nameless Blackfeet and Gros Ventre (A'aninin) man's episodic journey to piece together his fragmented identity. Welch received praise from such luminaries as Pulitzer Prize-winning Ojibwe author Louise Erdrich, celebrated American novelist Reynolds Price, and Coeur d'Alene author Sherman Alexie. Alexie later produced the film adaptation of the novel, which was released in 2012.

== Plot summary ==
The novel features a self-destructive narrator undergoing an identity crisis. After getting into a bar fight with a white man, the narrator comes home drunk to discover that his girlfriend, Agnes, has disappeared with his electric razor and gun. The narrator travels to Malta, Montana, to track her down, where he meets a white nameless "Airplane Man" from New York heading out West. He meets the Airplane Man again when he travels to Havre, Montana, where the man tries to convince the narrator to take him across the border to Calgary in an attempt to escape from the FBI. While the man buys a hunting knife and an old Ford Falcon, the narrator sees Agnes and her brother Dougie in the street. Later that night, the narrator finds Agnes in a bar and tries to talk to her, but Dougie and his friends beat him up. As the narrator leaves the bar, he sees the Airplane Man being arrested.

The narrator hitchhikes home and discovers that his grandmother has passed away. The next day he, Teresa, and Lame Bull dig a grave for her. While digging, the narrative flashes back to a memory of the narrator and his brother (Mose) herding cattle, which results in Mose's death. Once the grave is finished, the narrator leaves to visit Yellow Calf, who talks about the narrator's grandmother. She was the youngest wife of Standing Bear, from the Blackfeet tribe. The tribe survives starvation and a military assault during which Standing Bear is killed. The Blackfeet turn on the grandmother, and Yellow Calf helps her survive. The narrator then realizes that Yellow Calf is his grandfather. The next day, with the help of Teresa and Lame Bull, the narrator buries his grandmother. He ponders the future and resolves to work things out with Agnes.

== Characters ==
- The Narrator: A self-destructive, unnamed protagonist living with his mother and grandmother. He believes himself to be Blackfeet and Gros Ventre. The narrator is disconnected from his ancestry and is a "servant to a memory of death" due to unresolved trauma from the death of his father and older brother.
- First Raise: The narrator's father, from whom the narrator gets his connection to Fort Belknap. He froze to death in a borrow pit.
- Teresa: The narrator's Blackfeet and Catholic mother. She is married to Lame Bull after being widowed by her first husband, John First Raise. She is described as never having been "beautiful, [but] a woman who had grown handsome" with a stout body. A proprietor of good land, Teresa is financially stable and was wealthier partner from both her marriages. Her first marriage was an unhappy one, and she describes her former husband as a "foolish man." Teresa owns the ranch they live on and has a large expanse of good land and cattle.
- Airplane Man: A flighty, white man the narrator meets after leaving Fort Belknap.Together they spend time together drinking and loitering around the airport. The Airplane Man is representative of the "American" or "white" world that the narrator is a part of, but also alienated from.
- Agnes: The narrator's girlfriend. She is a Cree woman from Havre who's "scorned by the reservation people," and is believed to be married to the narrator. The narrator's grandmother harbors negative feelings toward Agnes because she is Cree. She only makes brief appearances in the novel, but her theft of the narrator's gun and electric razor engenders his journey. She is later found accompanied by her brother, Dougie.
- Mose: The narrator's older brother. He died at the age of fourteen after being hit by a car while herding cattle.
- Yellow Calf: A member of the Blackfeet tribe whom the narrator meets first when his father takes him on horseback to visit Yellow Calf. The narrator visits Yellow Calf twice as an adult. He is a blind and old. In his youth he helped the narrator's grandmother survive when her tribe ostracized her. The narrator discovers that Yellow Calf is his grandfather.
- The Grandmother: An old Blackfeet woman and the narrator's grandmother. She is blind and does not speak throughout the novel. Welch writes of her dislike of Agnes because she is Cree. Given that Agnes is Cree, the grandmother believes that she is a kind of bad luck charm and internally shames the narrator for having married her. She dies before the narrator returns from Havre.

== Setting ==
The novel takes place on the Fort Belknap Indian Reservation and along the Hi-Line of Montana. The narrator visits multiple cities in Montana, beginning with Fort Belknap. He travels north to Malta, and then west to Havre as he follows Agnes and the Airplane Man. The narrator moves in and out of the boundaries separating one part of his identity from the other. Paula Gunn Allen identifies Welch's work as one of many Native American fictional works to utilize opposing settings in a way that which "indicate[s] the pervasiveness of alienation as a continuing theme in American Indian writing...".

== Themes ==
=== Alienation ===
Following an increase in the number of Indigenous authors and literature published in the 1970s and 1980s during the Native American Renaissance, Native American literature as a genre diverged from preceding Native American works with the thematic inclusion of alienation. Paula Gunn Allen details the prevalence of alienation in contemporaneous Native American poetry and prose as an "experience of the single individual; it is a primary experience of all bicultural American Indians in the United States-and, to one extent or another, this includes virtually every American Indian." According to Allen, the unnamed narrator endures a lifetime of alienation due to his lack of a "clear sense of belonging to a people, a tradition, or a culture, resulting in a deeply fractured sense of self, showing both the degree of his lack of power and the extent of his self-estrangement."

=== Fragmented identity ===
Random House notes how Welch obscures the narrator's identity to emphasize his disconnection to his family and the outside world. The narrator says, "I felt no hatred, no love, no guilt, no conscience, nothing but a distance that had grown through the years" and proceeds to exist in an inebriated state throughout most of the novel, constantly reliving old memories. Allen states that the narrator is so "out of touch with himself that his long past relationships with his dead brother and father have more meaning for him than any of his contemporary ones, and he is adrift in a life that lacks shape, goal, understanding, or significance."

Andrew Horton argues that the narrator is separated between two perspectives and two worlds, which explains why the narrator is never named and why the plot is told in non-linear or "episodic" fashion. Welch has explained that his intention with the "episodic" narration was to create a circle; "the plot of the book continued around until the story came back to the same area at the end of the book as the beginning." According to Professor William "Bill" Bevins, the narrator's relationships with various characters throughout the novel also embody opposing realities. Though Welch has gainsaid autobiographical connections in his works, Horton notes that Welch's existence between two tribes made him straddle the line between those two worlds, a circumstance which Welch experienced with a uniquely disillusioned perspective. Kathleen M. Sands describes the narrator as someone who is "ineffective in relationships with people and at odds with his environment, not because he is deliberately rebellious, or even immaturely selfish, but because he has lost the story of who he is, where he has come from."

=== Recovery ===
Allen observes that the nameless narrator carries physical injuries and emotional trauma engendered by the death of his brother and father. Louis Owens writes that, "without an identity, the narrator is frozen in time, caught up in a wintry dormancy as he moves tentatively and tortuously toward a glimmer of self-knowledge." As he travels to find Agnes, the narrator undergoes an abstract recovery. Owens states that, "following the momentary response to life, the narrator begins to recount the events leading to his brother's death" and relives memories of his deceased father, First Raise. The narrator statement, "[i]t was beginning to get light," signals a movement towards healing, according to Owens. The novel continues a pattern of having traumatic triggers engender moments of reflective recovery with the "wild-eyed cow," Agnes, Marlene, Malvina, and Bird all contribute to the narrator's repeated regressions and violent outbursts. Owens writes, "as he has moved toward full remembrance of Mose's death, which took place when the narrator was twelve, he has been regressing toward childhood, in order to come to terms with his brother's death and his own guilt he must go back and begin again from that moment." His final moment of recovery, as represented in his conversation with Yellow Calf, is precipitated by memories of previous confrontations and re-livings of past events. Owens states that "the narrator's rebirth and reawakening, such as it is, comes to fruition in this scene as he says, 'Some people, I thought, will never know how pleasant it is to be distant in a clean rain, the driving rain of a summer storm. It's not like you'd expect, nothing like you'd expect.'"

=== Assimilation ===
Jennifer Kay Davis analyzes the shifting settings of Winter in the Blood in relation to the novel's preoccupation with assimilation and identity. Winter in the Blood explores both themes through the narrator's journey towards the rediscovery of his Blackfeet heritage. Davis' dissertation analyzes the novel's deviation from, "other Native American literature in which the main character simply returns to his or her native culture and leaves the white world behind." Return or assimilation represents a way of "resolving a psychological crisis-- but they modify these traditional patterns for modern, and specific personal, needs." In Davis' understanding, the novel follows the narrator as he navigates between assimilation and alienation. She states: "it is even more important that they feel a part of the culture to which they choose to belong-- i.e., they are not alienated."

== Reception ==
Winter in the Blood received attention and critical acclaim from literary critics and scholars. Louise Erdrich's introduction to Winter in the Blood called the novel a "work of slim majesty, lean, rich, funny, and grim" and a "quiet American masterwork." In a New York Times book review, novelist Reynolds Price described the novel as a "nearly flawless novel about human life. To say less is to patronize its complex knowledge, the amplitude of its means, and its clear lean voice." In 1977, a panel at the Modern Language Association Convention discussed the novel, analyzing Welch's "episodic" narration in particular. Following the literary studies convention in 1978, a Special Symposium Issue on Welch's novel commenced, producing over twenty reviews and journals. In 2003, retired University of Montana literature professor William "Bill" Bevis described the book as an "unflinching look at life on a Montana reservation," written so brilliantly "in [terms of] technique that it really took Native American writing to a new level" with "poetic and the [that] images were so exact...a great combination of poetic technique and hard realism."

== Film adaptation ==
Winter in the Blood was adapted as a screenplay by Ken White. It was produced as a 2012 feature film by Native American author Sherman Alexie with brothers Alex and Andrew Smith. It was the Official Selection in 2013 of the Los Angeles, Austin, and American Indian film festivals.
