= DuBiel Arms Company =

- Company type: Private
- Industry: firearms
- Founded: 1975
- Founder: Joseph T. DuBiel and Dr. John Tyson
- Defunct: Late 1980s
- Fate: Dissolved
- Headquarters: Sherman, Texas, U.S.
- Area served: U.S.
- Key people: Joe DuBiel
- Products: Rifles

DuBiel rifles showing available stock designs.

The DuBiel Arms Company was established in 1975 by Joseph T. DuBiel and John Tyson in Sherman, Texas, United States. The company produced premium centerfire bolt-action rifles, manufactured in the US with emphasis on the use of high-quality materials and master-craftmanship. The company ceased operations in the late 1980s. The largest collection of DuBiel rifles today is in the collection of the Cody Firearms Museum of the Buffalo Bill Historical Center in Cody, Wyoming.

== Patented DuBiel actions ==
DuBiel rifles were constructed using patented DuBiel actions, which featured a five lug bolt locking mechanism resulting in a 36 degree bolt rotation. The short rotation produced the fastest bolt-action rifle available at the time. The actions were produced in three lengths, both right and left hand configurations.

DuBiel rifle action.

== Patents ==
- United States Patent No. 4152855, Dated May 1979, Inventors: DuBiel, Joseph T. (Sherman, TX, US) and Tyson, John P. (Denison, TX, US)
