= Fools Crow =

1986 novel written by James Welch

- Author: James Welch
- Language: English
- Genre: Contemporary American Fiction, Native American
- Publisher: Viking
- Publication date: 1986
- Publication place: United States
- Media type: Print (hardback & paperback)
- Pages: 391 pp (Paperback edition)
- ISBN: 0-14-008937-3 (Paperback edition)
- OCLC: 15366761
- Dewey Decimal: 813/.54 19
- LC Class: PS3573.E44 F66 1987

Fools Crow is a 1986 novel written by Native American author James Welch. Set in Montana shortly after the Civil War, this novel tells of White Man's Dog (later known as Fools Crow), a young Blackfeet Indian on the verge of manhood, and his band, known as the Lone Eaters. The invasion of white society threatens to change their traditional way of life, and they must choose to fight or assimilate. The story is a portrait of a culture under pressure from colonization. The story culminates with the historic Marias Massacre of 1870, in which the U.S. Cavalry killed a friendly band of Blackfeet, consisting mostly of non-combatants.

== Plot summary ==
Set in 1870, the novel is about the lives of the southern Blackfeet people. The main character, White Man's Dog, joins his friend Fast Horse in a night-time raid against the Crow. White Man's Dog is portrayed as weak and powerless. Because of that, he visits the medicine man. Yellow Kidney appoints White Man's Dog to lead the young warriors in stealing a herd of horses. White Man's Dog is first wary, but he sings his warrior songs to gain courage. As they drive the horses away from the village, a scout appears. White Man's Dog rushes in and kills the scout. Fast Horse shouts awakening the village, and the Crow respond. Yellow Kidney hides in a lodge where he sees people sleeping. He hides beneath the robes (sleeping bag) of a young girl. He becomes aroused and rapes her before realizing she is dying of a disease they call White Scabs (smallpox). Trying to escape, Yellow Kidney is shot and captured by the Crow. They cut off his fingers, tie him to a horse, and send him out into a driving snowstorm.

White Man's Dog returns to his tribe and gains respect for the raid. Feeling responsible for the loss of Yellow Kidney, he begins to provide the youth's family with food and supplies. Yellow Kidney finally returns to camp and tells the story of Fast Horse's error. Shamed, Fast Horse leaves the tribe, joining Owl Child and his renegade band in killing the encroaching Napikwans (white people).

At the Sun Dance, White Man's Dog released wolverine from a trap, gaining his first spirit animal. He took part in the Sun Dance, a ritual physical trial. He sought purification from feeling sexual desire for his father's third wife, Kills-Close-to-the-Lake. After a dream in which she left him a white stone the size of a finger, he awakens to find such a stone next to him. Toward the end of the Sun Dance, Kills-close-to-the-lake tells him she sacrificed her finger to purify herself from the same sexual desires.

When Red Paint becomes pregnant, she and White Man's Dog decide to name their child as "Sleep Bringer". This was inspired by a butterfly which Red Paint saw when she began to think she was pregnant.

After a raid on the Crow, White Man's Dog came home and was given a naming ceremony. He was in a drunken state however, and had told everyone that he had pretended to be dead and then killed and scalped Bull Shield. In reality however, he had passed out for only a few seconds which led Bull Shield to believe he was dead, but White Man's Dog reached for his gun and shot the Crow chief three times before he could be killed himself. His stories were greatly exaggerated and that led to people thinking that he had used his "good medicine" to confuse the Crow, hence the name that he was given, "Fools Crow."

After his return, Fools Crow has a second dream, in which the Raven, a powerful figure, orders him to kill a mountain man who had been hunting animals for fun and leaving their bodies to rot. The Pikunis consider this to be heinous, as their culture works to keep balance and take no more than they need. Fools Crow finds the Napikwan and attacks him; after a tough fight, Fools Crow kills his foe and suffers a spear wound. He takes a wolf's scalp from the Napikwan. He is recruited to take over the Dry Bones and learn the Beaver medicine.

Yellow Kidney decides to leave the tribe, feeling isolated by losing his fingers. While out alone, he decides to go back and name Red Paint's child as Yellow Calf. He accepts his mutilation and realizes that he can live well even without the use of his fingers. Before his return to the band, he is shot by a Napikwan. He was avenging terrorism by Owl Child's gang.

Red Paint's younger brother contracts rabies after being bitten by a rabid wolf. Fools Crow is called to cure him, as his teacher Mik-api is away, healing another tribe. Fools Crow has changed from a warrior to a healer.

Fast Horse comes upon Yellow Kidney's body and returns it to the tribe, but he goes north to live alone.

The book ends with Fools Crow visiting the mythic Feather Woman, the wife of Morning Star and mother of Star Boy. Fools Crow watches a "yellow hide" and notices that images are forming within the hide. The yellow hide reveals five different visions.

- The first is the spread of smallpox within his camp, with numerous dead bodies stacked on a platform.
- The second is the destruction of Heavy Runner's camp by the seizers (white soldiers).
- The third is lifeless land all around the region; not one animal can be seen.
- The fourth is Indian children attending a boarding school with their hair cut off.

Feather Woman tells Fools Crow to prepare the Pikuni for what is to come and to pass on their traditions. She tells him that he can do much good for the Pikuni and that he will pass on the stories. Fools Crow returns to his tribe, but he is unable to prevent the disasters he has foreseen.

He meets Native Americans being forced to migrate north and accepts that the Napikwan are swarming over the land. His people must change their way of life, shifting from bison and game to fish. At the conclusion, Welch tells about the Pikuni through the animals, showing that although their practices changed, their culture lives on indefinitely.

== Characters ==
- Pikuni – A clan of the Blackfeet tribe.
- Napikwan – refers to White people.
- Three Bears – Chief of Lone Eaters. Well-respected.
- Rides-at-the-Door – Fools Crow's father. Becomes chief after Three Bears dies.
- White Man's Dog/Fools Crow – Protagonist. Will eventually lead his tribe to victory.
- Double Strike Woman – Fools Crow's mother and Rides-at-the-Door's wife.
- Striped Face – Second wife of Rides-at-the-Door.
- Kills Close to the Lake- Third wife of Rides-at-the-Door. She is 17 years old.
- Running Fisher – Fools Crow's brother.
- Fast Horse – Fools Crow's friend, son of Boss Ribs. Turns away from tradition, but atones by returning Yellow Kidney's body.
- Yellow Kidney – Leader of the horse raid, where he rapes a dying young woman and is captured. Father of Red Paint and father-in-law of Fools Crow. Eventually killed by the Napikwan.
- Heavy Shield Woman – Wife of Yellow Kidney.
- Red Paint – Daughter of Yellow Kidney, marries Fools Crow.
- Mik-Api – Medicine man of the Blackfeet. Teaches Fools Crow the traditional songs and medicines.
- Owl Child – A Pikuni rebel who plans on waging war on Napikwan. Provokes retaliation.
- Chief Mountain – Pikuni chief who aligns with armed struggle rather than compromise. (Not historically accurate. Mountain Chief was the final leader of the Blackfeet tribe, not Rides-at-the-door, a fictional character.)
- Heavy Runner – Pikuni leader who, in contrast to Mountain Chief, cooperated with the US. (Heavy Runner's band was mistakenly killed by Army forces at the Marias Massacre.)
- Boss Ribs – Father of Fast Horse. Well respected in the tribe

== Reception ==
Fools Crow was well-received by critics. It was awarded the Los Angeles Times Book Prize, American Book Award, and the Pacific Northwest Booksellers Association Award.
