= Ervin Homestead-Gist Bottom Historic District =

Historic district in Montana, United States

- U.S. National Register of Historic Places
- U.S. Historic district
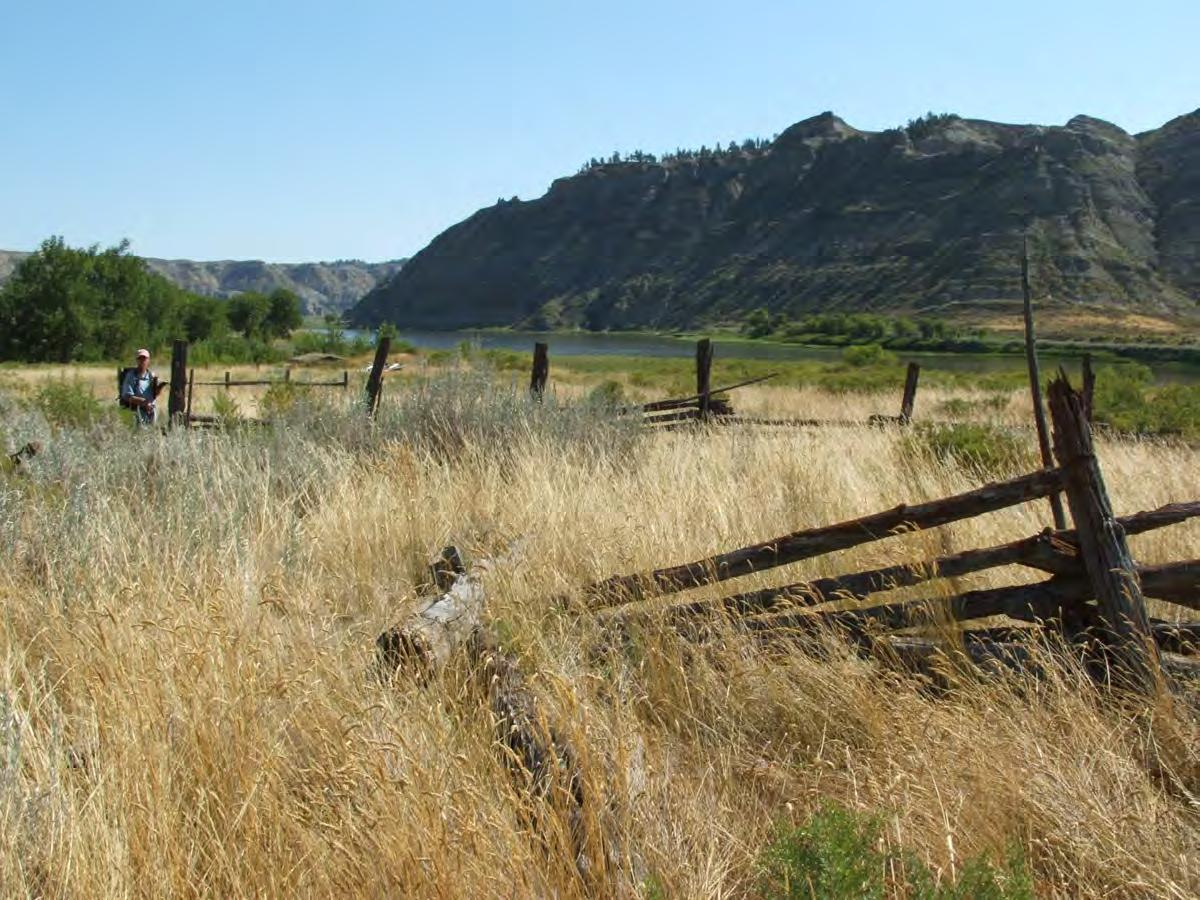
- The corral of the Ervin Homestead

- Location within Montana Location within the United States
- Location: River Mile 122.3 Left, vicinity of Hays in Blaine County, Montana
- Coordinates: 47.804865°N 109.011018°W
- Area: 189 acres (76 ha)
- Built: 1910
- NRHP reference No.: 16000410
- Added to NRHP: June 23, 2016

The Ervin Homestead-Gist Bottom Historic District is a historic district in the Missouri Breaks area of Blaine County, Montana which was listed on the National Register of Historic Places in 2016.

It was homesteaded by John Ervin around 1910 then developed by the Gist family.

The Gist family sold the land to the Bureau of Land Management in 1980. It is included in the Upper Missouri River Breaks National Monument.
