= Lodgepole Community Hall =

- U.S. National Register of Historic Places
- Location within Montana Location within the United States
- Location: Fort Belknap Indian Community, Lodgepole, Montana
- Coordinates: 48°02′04″N 108°31′57″W
- Area: 0.2 acres (0.081 ha)
- Built: 1936
- Built by: Works Progress Administration
- Architectural style: Neo-Native American
- NRHP reference No.: 00000148
- Added to NRHP: February 24, 2000

Lodgepole Community Hall is a site on the National Register of Historic Places located in Lodgepole, Montana on the Fort Belknap Indian Reservation. It was added to the Register on February 24, 2000.

== Background ==
A historic placard at the site reads:

The Lodgepole Community Hall was dedicated in November 1936 in a ceremony the Harlem News called an interesting mix of "Indian tribal tradition and modern governmental activity." In fact, that mix can be seen in the hall itself. Works Progress Administration (WPA) crews built the hall with timber likely logged in the Little Rockies by members of the Civilian Conservation Corps (CCC). Both the WPA and CCC were New Deal programs aimed at putting people to work in the midst of the Depression. The hall's log walls — now concealed by exterior siding — reflected the Rustic style often favored by the WPA. Inside the hall evenly spaced vertical logs line the walls to provide structural stability. An eighteen-foot-ceiling shelters the expansive dance floor, which is also marked out for a basketball court. Bleachers overlook the dance floor and a raised stage sits at one end. The hall's irregular shape echoes the shape of round halls built on Fort Belknap at the turn of the century. These, in turn, mirrored the temporary arenas Assiniboines created for dances by circling their wagons. In the 1930s, the hall was the site of children's programs, basketball games, "white dances," and such feature films as Call of the Rockies and Last of the Mohicans. Such programs nurtured the community by providing opportunities to gather. So, too, did the frequent traditional feasts and dances — including weeklong dances held at Christmastime — that played an essential role in sustaining Assiniboine cultural traditions.

The hall is one big 18 feet (5.5 m) tall room.
