= George Horse Capture =

A'aninin Native American anthropologist and writer

George P. Horse Capture
- Nay Gyagya Nee ("Spotted Otter")
- Born: George Paul Horse Capture; October 20, 1937; Fort Belknap Agency, Montana
- Died: April 16, 2013 (aged 75); Great Falls, Montana
- Resting place: Fort Belknap Agency Cemetery
- Other names: "Grandpa Braids", Butch, George Capture
- Education: Bachelor's degree, anthropology, Master's degree, history
- Alma mater: Butte High School, University of California, Berkeley, Montana State University
- Occupations: Anthropologist, activist, museum curator, professor of American Indian Studies, shipfitter, welder
- Employer(s): National Museum of the American Indian, Plains Indian Museum at the Buffalo Bill Historical Center, Montana State University
- Known for: Participation in the Native American occupation of Alcatraz Island; one of the first Native American museum curators
- Spouse(s): Vera Capture, KayKarol Horse Capture
- Children: George Jr., Joseph, Daylight and Peter
- Parent(s): Joseph Horse Capture and Carmen Falcon Deane; stepfather, Peter Deane
- Awards: Honorary Doctorate of Letters, Montana State University-Bozeman; Humanities Award, Montana Committee of the Humanities; Presidential Appointee to the National Museum Services Board; member of the Montana Committee for the Humanities; Award of Merit from the American Association for State and Local History, 1990

George Paul Horse Capture (October 20, 1937 – April 16, 2013) (A'aninin) was an anthropologist, activist, and writer.

Horse Capture was one of the earlier Native Americans to be a museum curator. He was the first curator of the Plains Indian Museum in Cody, Wyoming, and worked for a decade at the National Museum of the American Indian, during planning for its new building on the Mall in Washington, DC. He was an enrolled member of the Fort Belknap Indian Community of the Fort Belknap Reservation of Montana.

== Early life and education ==
George Horse Capture was born into the A'aninin (Gros Ventre) in a log cabin in Fort Belknap, which is located in north-central Montana, near Harlem. He was an enrolled member of the tribe. As a child, he lived with his maternal grandmother and cousins on the reservation. When it came time for high school, he moved to Butte, Montana, where he joined his mother. After graduating, he joined the U.S. Navy, serving as a shipfitter for four years.

After leaving the Navy, Horse Capture worked for five years as a welder's helper, becoming a steel inspector for the California Department of Water Resources; he was "the only minority person at that time for the State of California." He participated in the Native American occupation of Alcatraz Island beginning in 1969. It gathered national attention for American Indian activism and issues. His participation at Alcatraz spurred his decision to enroll at University of California, Berkeley, where he earned a bachelor's degree in anthropology.

== Academic career ==
Horse Capture returned to Montana, where he served as assistant professor of American Indian Studies at Montana State University in Bozeman. He also taught college in Great Falls and earned a master's in history at the university there.

In 1979, Horse Capture was hired as the first curator of the Plains Indian Museum at the Buffalo Bill Historical Center, Cody, Wyoming; he was one of the first Native Americans to serve as a museum curator in the US. He is credited with bringing the museum to "national prominence."

He would "give his people an unprecedented voice in how their heritage would be presented and their artifacts displayed." During his tenure, George organized important exhibitions, such as "Wounded Knee: Lest We Forget" and "PowWow." He also organized the Plains Indian Seminars that allowed Indian people and Anglos to exchange ideas and present new scholarly material. George worked closely with Indian tribes throughout the Northern Plains insuring that their voices were heard in a museum setting. He founded the first powwow grounds associated with a museum in the country. Annual celebrations continue to be held at the Joe Robbie Powwow Gardens.

He also started publishing some of the material he had collected on the Gros Ventre and their culture and language.

In 1994, Horse Capture was selected as the Deputy Assistant Director for Cultural Resources at the National Museum of the American Indian in New York City. He worked at NMAI for 10 years, helping to develop the new museum to be built on the Mall in Washington, DC. He served as senior counselor to the director. He retired in 2004. "He was determined to make it a museum for Native peoples, not just about them." In 2005, he organized a conference at the University of Great Falls, "American Indian Nations: Yesterday, Today and Tomorrow."

== Personal life ==
He married Kay-Karol, his third wife. He had children from his previous marriages: George Jr., Joseph, Daylight, and Peter.

Horse Capture died April 16, 2013, of kidney failure at their home in Great Falls, as complications from diabetes and congestive heart failure. He was buried at Fort Belknap Agency Cemetery. He was survived by his third wife, KayKarol Horse Capture, and his four children. His many grandchildren and great-grandchildren knew him as "Grandpa Braids".

== Works ==
His published works include The Seven Visions of Bull Lodge (1980/1996), which he edited and annotated An American Indian Perspective, I'd Rather Be Powwowing, and Indian Country. Horse Capture spent his entire professional life gathering materials about his tribe, the A'aninin. These works include photographs, objects, publications, and songs. With this material, he created the Tribal Archive Project, "a database that includes information from worldwide museum sources about the A'aninin." One month after he presented his final version of the archive to tribal members, he died. This may be the first tribal digital archive created.
