= G. Bruce Meyers =

American politician

Bruce Meyers

Member of the Montana House of Representatives from the 32nd district
- In office January 5, 2015 – January 2, 2017
- Preceded by: Clarena Brockie
- Succeeded by: Jonathan Windy Boy

Personal details
- Born: June 14, 1948 (age 78) Belknap, Montana, United States
- Party: Republican

Gilbert Bruce Meyers (born June 14, 1948) is an American politician. He served as a Republican member for the 32nd district in the Montana House of Representatives for the 2015 session. A Native American, he is a member of the Chippewa-Cree tribe.
