= Theresa Lamebull =

Last speaker of the Gros Ventre language

Theresa Walker Lamebull
- BeeKanHay
- Born: Theresa Elizabeth Chandler; April 19, 1896; Near Hays, Montana, US
- Died: August 10, 2007 (aged 111); Havre, Montana, US
- Known for: Living to be 111, last fluent speaker of the Gros Ventre language
- Spouse(s): John Walker (died 1962) Andrew Lamebull
- Children: 10

Theresa Elizabeth White Weasel Walker Lamebull (née Chandler; April 19, 1896 – August 10, 2007) was a supercentenarian who was the oldest living member of the Gros Ventre Tribe of Montana. Her name in Gros Ventre was BeeKanHay (lit. 'Kills At Night').

Lamebull's family had not known exactly how old she was until some time around 2005 when they found a baptismal certificate which may be hers. A priest translated the Latin on the certificate as saying she was a year old when she was baptised in 1897.

Lamebull was a fluent speaker of the Gros Ventre language, spoken by only a handful of other people. She helped teaching the language at Fort Belknap College, and contributed to a dictionary using the Phraselator when she was 109.

The Hays Education Resource Center on the Fort Belknap Reservation was named the 'Kills At Night Center' in her honor and at the naming ceremony Terry Brockie, an A'aninin (Gros Ventres) language teacher sang her a traditional song in the A'aninin language.

She died in August 2007 at the age of 111. A funeral Mass was held at St. Paul's Catholic Gymnasium in Hays, Montana, and she was buried at Mission Cemetery.
