= Buffalo Bill Center of the West =

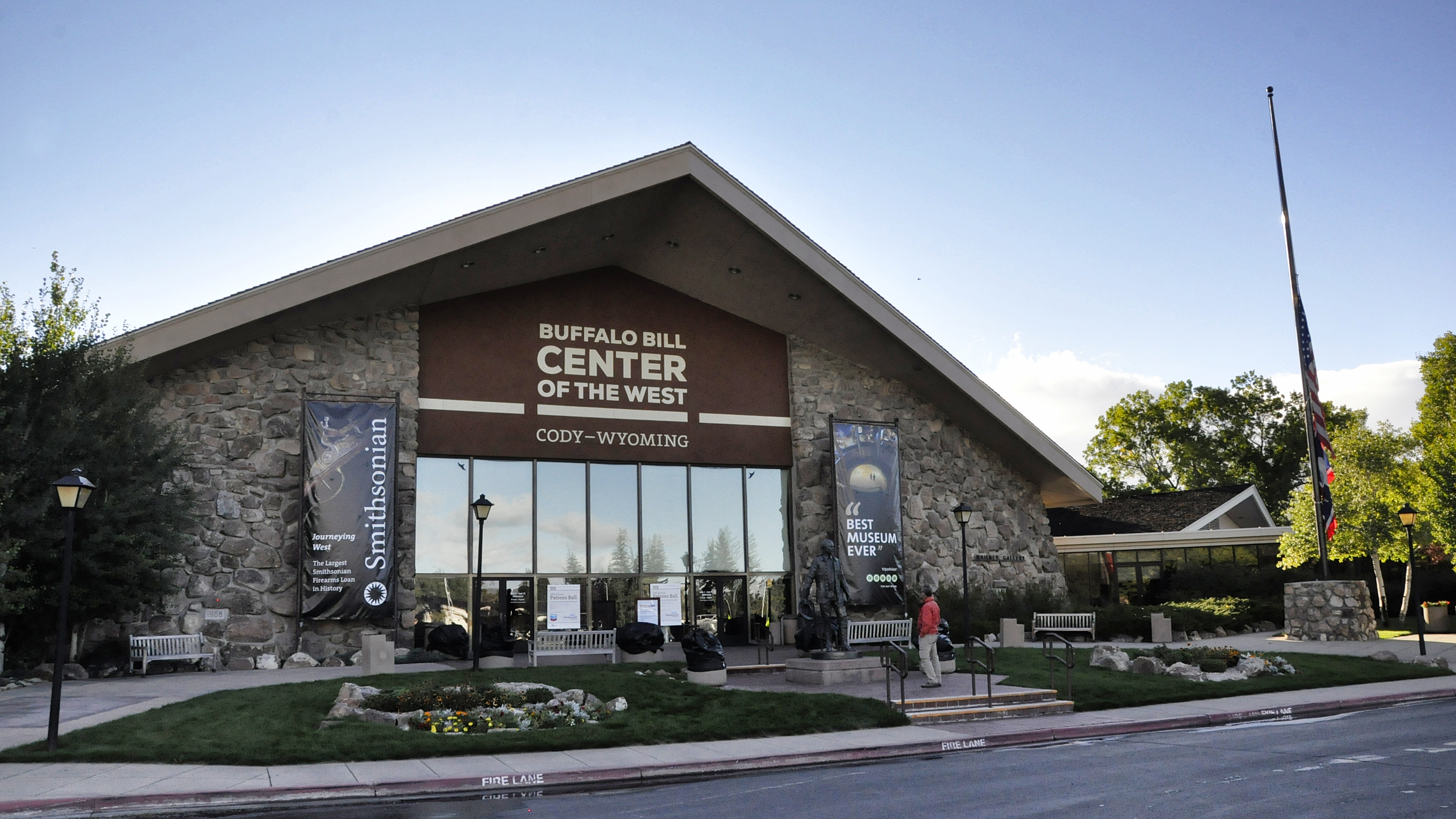
- Established: 1917
- Location: 720 Sheridan Avenue; Cody, Wyoming, United States
- Coordinates: 44.525055°N 109.073135°W
- Type: American West museums
- Website: http://centerofthewest.org

The Buffalo Bill Center of the West, formerly known as the Buffalo Bill Historical Center, is a complex of five museums and a research library featuring art and artifacts of the American West located in Cody, Wyoming. The five museums are the Buffalo Bill Museum, Plains Indians Museum, Whitney Western Art Museum, Draper Natural History Museum, and Cody Firearms Museum. Founded in 1917 to preserve the legacy and vision of Col. William F. "Buffalo Bill" Cody, the Buffalo Bill Center of the West is the oldest and most comprehensive museum complex of the West.

== Background ==
The complex can be traced to 1917, when the Buffalo Bill Memorial Association was established after the death of William F. Cody, the original Buffalo Bill. Gradually other elements were added to what started as a historical center. The current seven-acre building has more than 50,000 artifacts and holds five museums.

Since 2008, the center has been part of the Smithsonian Affiliates program, the first museum complex in Wyoming to have this status. As an Affiliate, the Center of the West has hosted Smithsonian artifacts. It has also loaned some of its own vast collections to a Smithsonian exhibition in Washington, D.C.

The museums are connected by the unifying theme of the history, culture, art, and natural science of the American West. The Center of the West's overall mission is to connect people to the American West. The institution includes the Buffalo Bill Museum, redesigned in 2012, which highlights Western ephemera and historic objects in telling the life story of W. F. "Buffalo Bill" Cody. Edward Rothstein of the New York Times wrote,

The exhibition [on Buffalo Bill] affirms what the center as a whole demonstrates: that behind the mythologizing is something worth cherishing, even if it is flawed, complex and still evolving. The old impulse to demolish the myth has been put aside.

== Buffalo Bill Museum ==
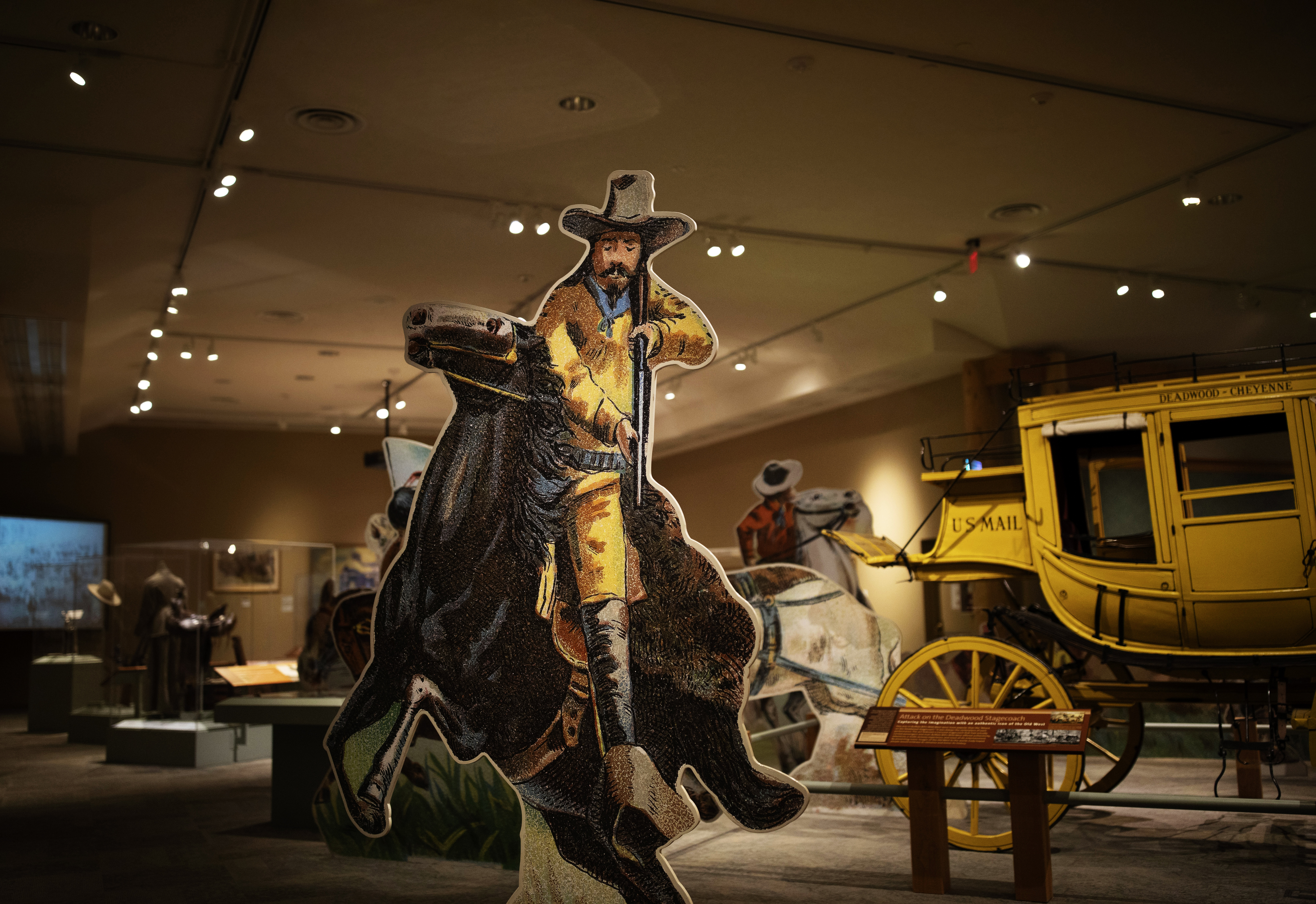
A section of the Buffalo Bill Museum

The inaugural museum opened in 1927 in a log cabin across from the current location. It was moved and reinstalled in 1968, and it is now part of a five-museum complex. The museum offers a wide-ranging view of the life and times of William F. Cody, as well as of the "Buffalo Bill" character he created, which made him the world's most celebrated person of his time.

The museum showcases the fame and success Cody attained through his "Buffalo Bill's Wild West show," and addresses his influence on the economic and cultural development of the American West.

== Plains Indians Museum ==
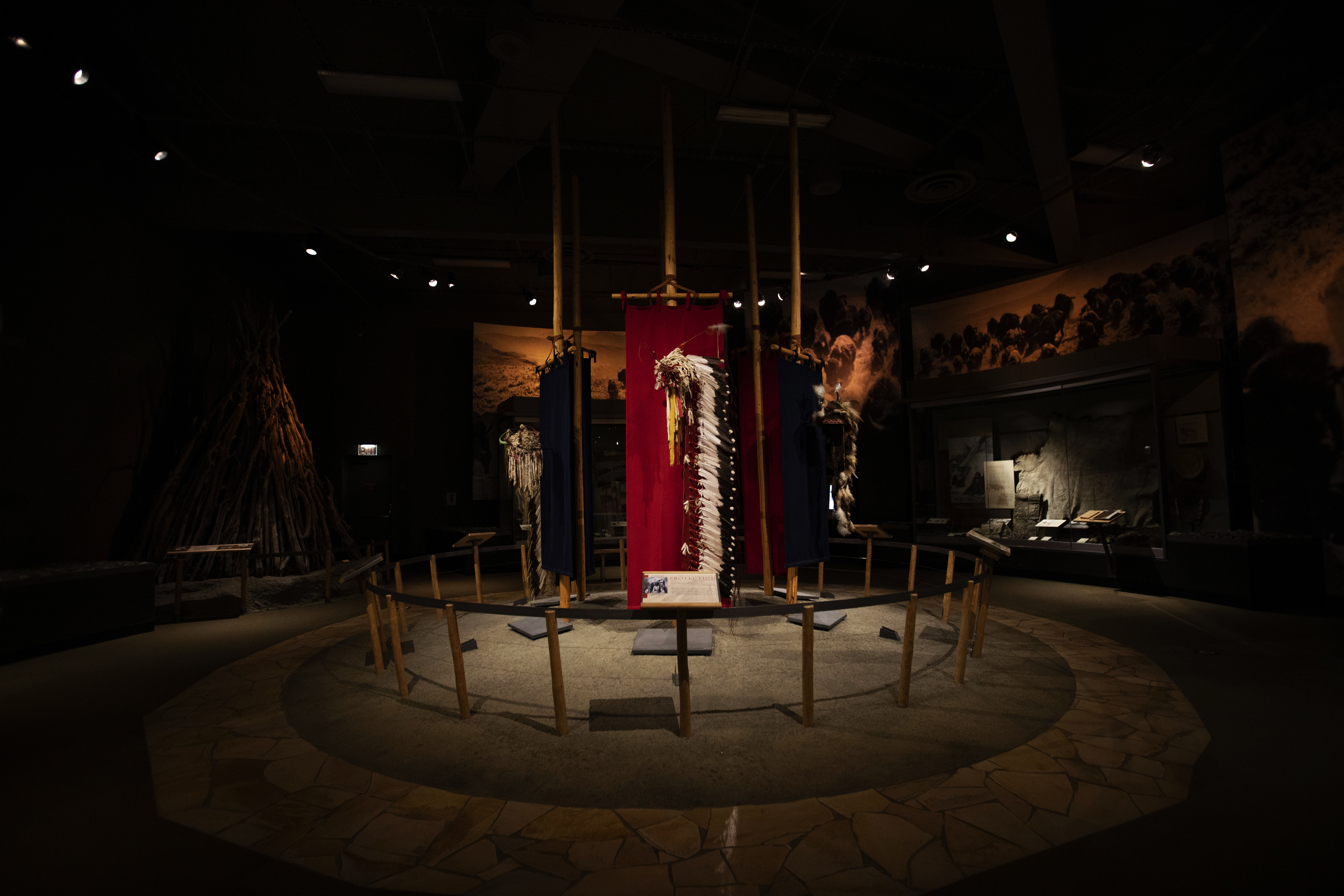
Headdresses from Plains Indians of the 1800s

The museum features the stories and objects of Plains Indian people, their cultures, traditions, values and histories, as well as the contexts of their lives today. The first curator was George Horse-Capture, an enrolled member of the A'aninin tribe. The majority of the collection is from the early reservation period, ca. 1880–1930. It contains artifacts primarily from Northern Plains tribes, such as the Arapaho, Lakota, Crow, Cheyenne, Blackfeet and Pawnee. The holdings also include important contemporary objects, ranging from abstract art to star quilts.

The museum sponsors an annual Powwow held on the third weekend in June at the Robbie Powwow Garden at the Center of the West. This event attracts dancers, artisans, and visitors from all over North America.

== Whitney Western Art Museum ==
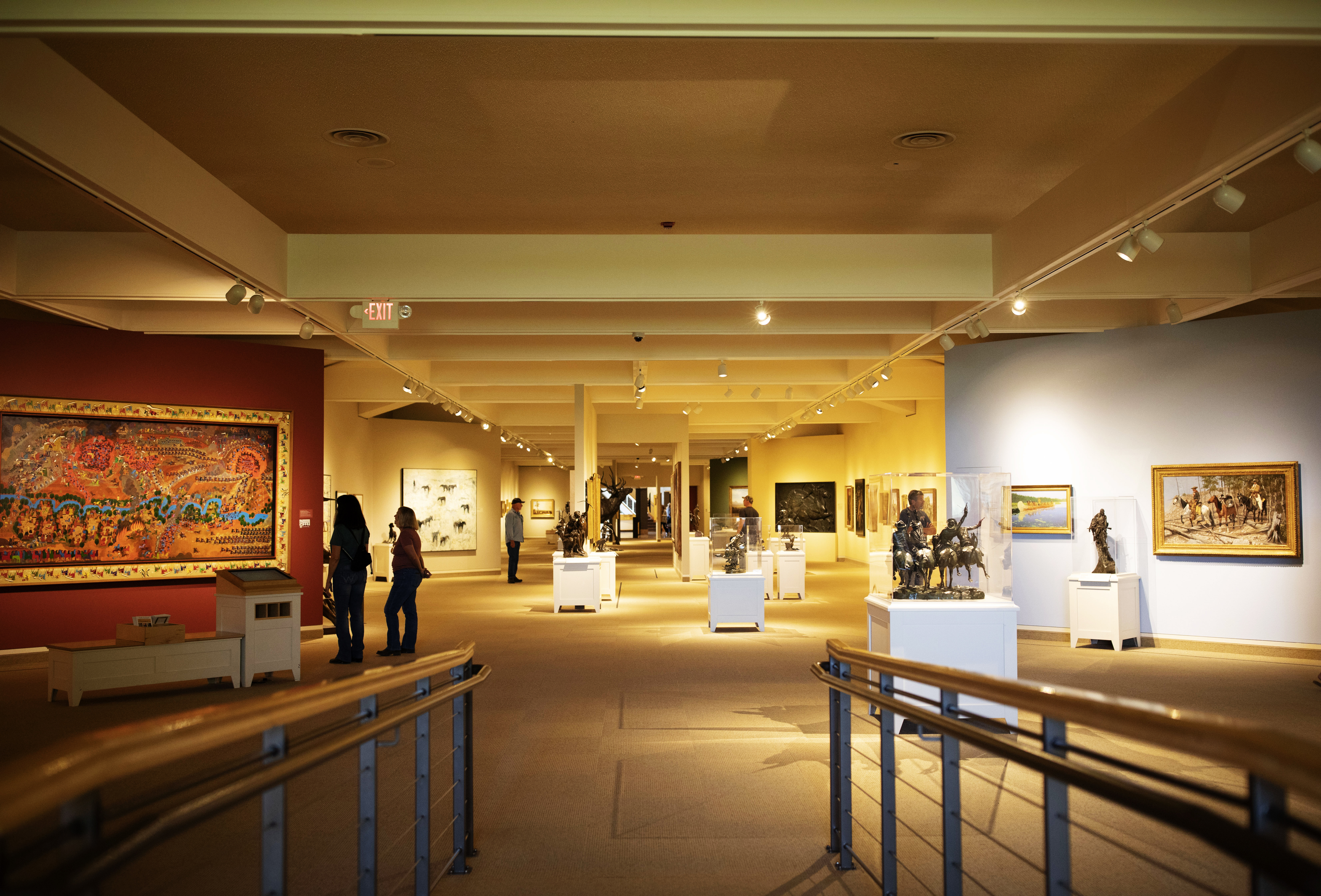
Works inside the Whitney Western Art Museum

The museum features paintings and sculptures of the American West. The gallery first opened in 1959 and was later united with the Buffalo Bill Museum.

In June 2009, it re-opened following a re-installation. Replicas of the studios of both Frederic Remington and Alexander Phimister Proctor help visitors learn about the artists and their techniques. Included are works by other classic Western artists: George Catlin, Edgar Samuel Paxson, Alfred Jacob Miller, Thomas Moran, Albert Bierstadt, Alexander Phimister Proctor, Joseph Henry Sharp, and N. C. Wyeth. Contemporary Western artists include Harry Jackson, James Bama, Deborah Butterfield, Fritz Scholder, and sculptor Grant Speed. Interactive stations allow visitors to create their own works of art.

== Draper Natural History Museum ==
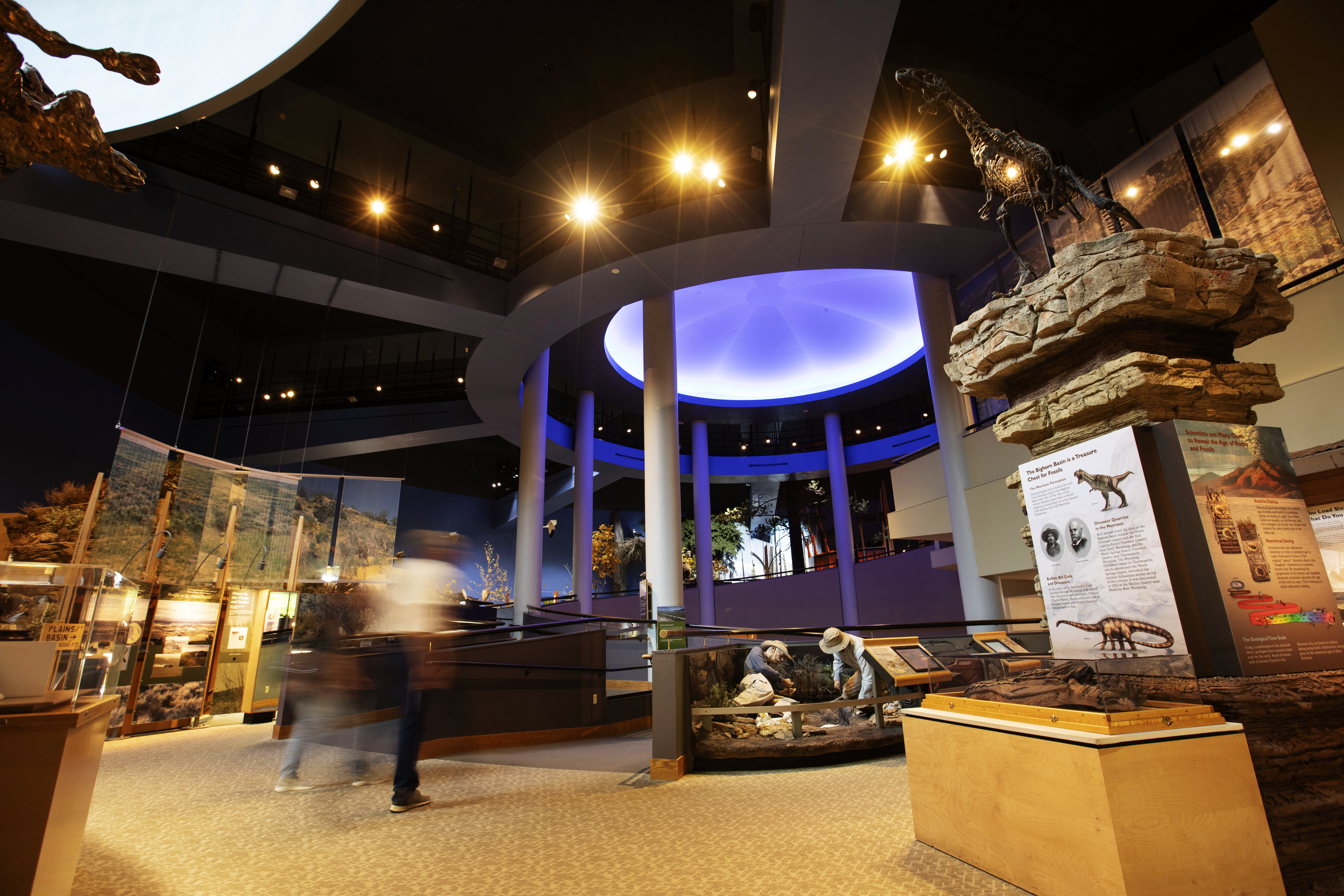
A view from the Plains Basin Environment inside the Draper Natural History Museum

The museum features approximately 20,000 square feet (1,900 m^{2}) of interactive exhibits highlighting geology, wildlife, and human presence in the Greater Yellowstone region. Videos, natural history dioramas, and photography replicate the sights, sounds, and smells of the area. Specimens of grizzlies, wolves, bighorn sheep, moose, elk and other wildlife are on display.

== Cody Firearms Museum ==
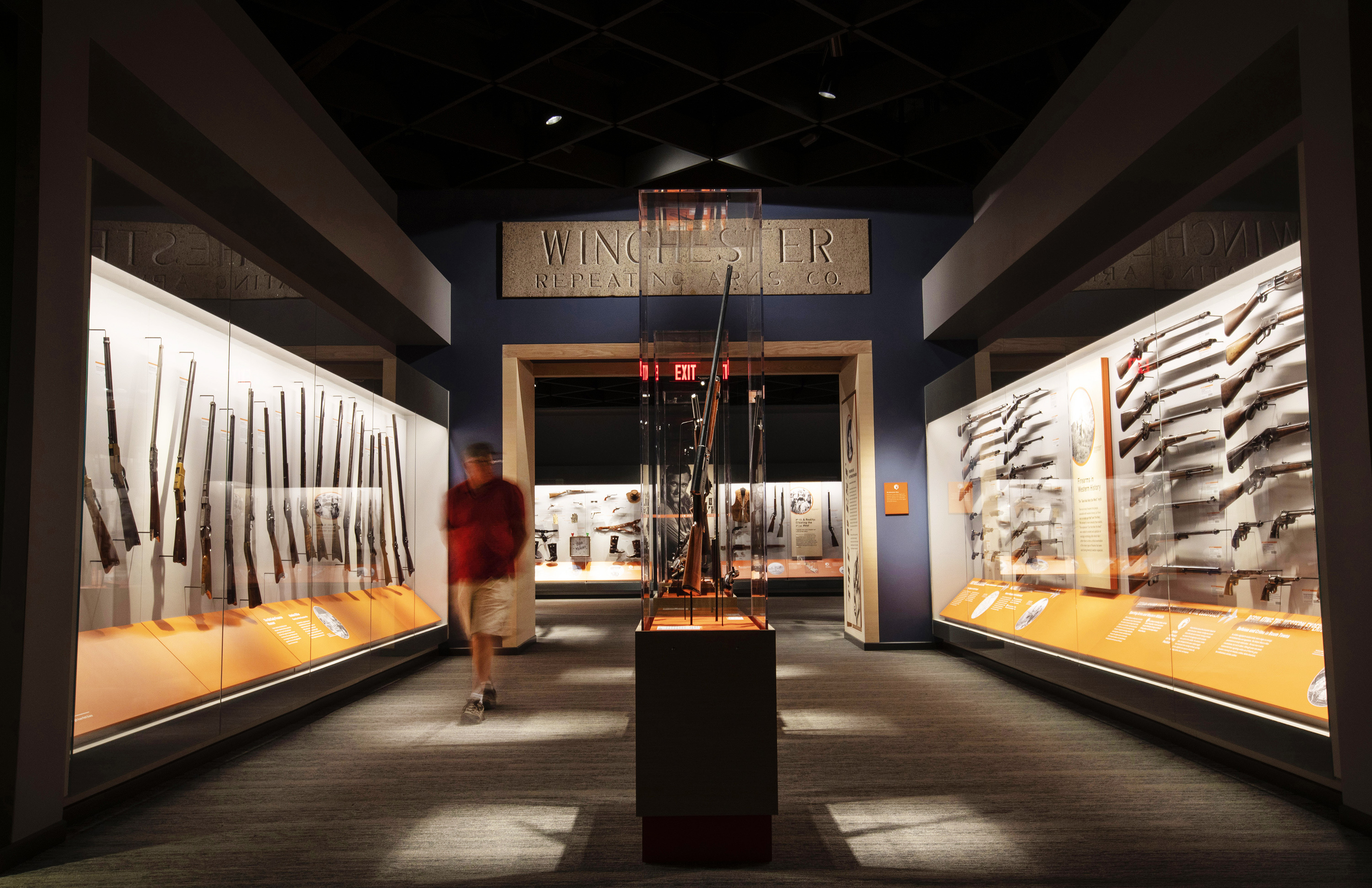
The Winchester collection at the Cody Firearms Museum

The Cody Firearms Museum was completely redesigned and reinstalled in 2019 and contains the most comprehensive firearms museum in the United States. The collection includes firearms ranging from 16th-century hand cannons to guns of modern manufacture. It explores firearms as "tools of human endeavors" and boasts a collection of 7,000 individual firearms—4,200 of which are on display—with approximately 20,000 additional related artifacts. The core of the museum is the Winchester Repeating Arms Company factory collection, which was transported from New Haven, Connecticut to Cody in 1976. The collection has grown to include firearms from many other manufacturers.

== Programming and activities ==
The Center of the West offers a variety of programs for visitors, including lectures, family activities, and chuckwagon dinners, based on availability.

== McCracken Research Library ==
The library houses a collection of 36,000 books, more than 600 numbered manuscript collections, and more than a million photographic images. Named in honor of Harold McCracken, writer, artist, and developer of the Buffalo Bill Center of the West, the library supports "inquiry across many disciplines related to the American West." The library has strong collections relating to Buffalo Bill, the Wild West show, Plains Indians, cattle and "dude" ranching, the fishing and hunting industries, the oil industry, Yellowstone National Park, and the Winchester Repeating Arms Company.
