= James Welch (writer) =

Native American writer and poet (1940-2003)

- Welch in 2000 after being knighted and awarded an honorary medal by France
- Born: November 18, 1940; Browning, Montana, U.S.
- Died: August 4, 2003 (aged 62); Missoula, Montana, U.S.
- Education: University of Montana (BA)
- Occupations: Author, educator
- Spouse: Lois Monk (m. 1968)
- Writing career
- Notable works: Winter in the Blood (1974); Fools Crow (1986)
- Movement: Native American Renaissance

James Phillip Welch Jr. (November 18, 1940 – August 4, 2003), who grew up within the Blackfeet and A'aninin cultures of his parents, was a Native American novelist and poet. He is considered a founding author of the Native American Renaissance. His novel Fools Crow (1986) received several national literary awards, and his debut novel Winter in the Blood (1974) was adapted as a film by the same name, released in 2013.

In 1997 Welch received a Lifetime Achievement Award from the Native Writers' Circle of the Americas.

== Early life ==
James Welch was born in Browning, Montana on November 18, 1940. His father, James Phillip Welch Sr. (June 3, 1914 – May 23, 2006), a welder and rancher, was a member of the Blackfeet tribe. His mother, Rosella Marie (née O'Bryan) Welch (December 14, 1914 – July 3, 2003), a stenographer for the Bureau of Indian Affairs, was a member of the Gros Ventre (A'aninin). Both also had Irish ancestry but had grown up within Native American cultures. As a child, Welch attended schools on the Blackfeet and Fort Belknap reservations. Because Welch was raised in an American Indian setting, the traditions and religion, specifically from the Blackfoot history, were the sources of his writing.

== Education ==
In 1958, James Welch graduated from Washburn High School in Minneapolis. Post high school he worked as a firefighter for the U.S. Forest Service, as a laborer and as an Upward Bound counselor. Eventually, Welch began a master of fine arts degree program at the University of Montana. It was there that he studied under the poet Richard Hugo, who told him that "his poetry needed roots, so he should write what he knew about. Write about Indians and Indian culture. Write about home" he said. He graduated in 1965 with a B.A. in liberal arts. Shortly after, Welch published his first poem in the "Montana poet" issue of Visions International in 1967. He also briefly attended Northern Montana College.

== Career ==
He began his writing career publishing poetry and fiction. His novels established his place in the Native American Renaissance literary movement. Welch also taught at the university. He also received Honorary Doctorates from Rocky Mountain College (1993) and the University of Montana (1997).

James Welch had a following in Europe. In 1995, Welch was given the Chevalier de l'ordre des Arts et des Lettres (Knight of the Order of the Arts and Letters) by the French Cultural Ministry. His novels were translated into nine foreign languages.

Welch's work was collected in Nothing but the Truth: an Anthology of Native American Literature. He is one of the early authors of what became called the Native American literary renaissance. He wanted to explore Native American life in his writing, both its good and bad aspects as people struggled with modern United States culture.

He based his rich landscape imagery on lands he knew in Montana. In his writing, the landscape was featured as a character. Welch had a unique style of writing from "'an outside observer with an insider's understanding' of Native American experience." Although he was raised on the reservation as a young boy, he lived most of his life off of it. He said that he felt a lack of close connection with the tribal community.

In 1968, James Welch married Lois Monk, a comparative literature professor at the University of Montana. She was head of the English Department there until her retirement. During her sabbaticals, they traveled internationally and lived in France, Greece, Italy, and Mexico. Welch often used these periods to help finish his novels, taking advantage of the relative isolation.

The couple donated regularly to the Piegan Institute's language immersion program, dedicated to restoring use of the Blackfeet language.

In her introduction to the 2007 reprint of Winter in the Blood, fellow writer Louise Erdrich said: "It is a central and inspiring text to a generation of western regional and Native American writers, including me."

In addition to his novels, Welch co-wrote with Paul Stekler the screenplay for Last Stand at Little Bighorn, the Emmy Award-winning documentary that was part of the American Experience, shown on PBS.

Welch served on the board of directors of the D'Arcy McNickle Center of the Newberry Library in Chicago.

== Death ==
James Welch died of lung cancer at the age of sixty-two in Missoula, Montana, on Monday, August 4, 2003.

== Poetry and novels ==
When he began his writing, Indian authors were unknown in mainstream literary culture. Of his inspiration and purpose, James Welch noted: "Kind of growing up around the reservations, I just kept my eyes open and my ears open, listened to a lot of stories. You might say my senses were really brought alive by that culture. I learned more about it than I knew I did. It was only after I began writing about it that I realize that I had learned. I knew quite a bit, in certain ways, about the Blackfeet and Gros Ventre ways of life."

Welch's poems are alert, sorrowful, and true. His only collection of poetry, Riding the Earthboy 40 (1971), is deeply ingrained in the steppe of Montana. Shortened but expressive, the poems arrive in an instant of thought or experience that handles seasons, animals, and the stories that reservation Native Americans tell.

After writing poetry "exclusively for seven or eight years," Welch turned his attention towards fiction and his first novel, Winter in the Blood, a severe narrative about a nameless youth living on a reservation in northern Montana. Winter in the Blood (1974) attracted immediate critical interest, and, in 1977, scholars discussed the novel at the annual Modern Language Association convention. The notes from the session were released a year after the seminar in a special symposium issue of American Indian Quarterly, edited by Peter G Beidler.

In Winter in the Blood (1974), Welch presents a nameless protagonist who feels displaced, caught between two worlds, helpless in a world of stalking white men, but unaccepted by Indians—a stranger to both. The unnamed narrator is, like Welch, a mix of Blackfoot and Gros Ventre Indian. He calls himself a "servant to a memory of death." (James Welch) Both his father and brother are dead; in the midst of the novel, his deeply loved grandmother also dies. Similarly, in The Death of Jim Loney (1979), Welch portrays a half-blood who is unable to find a place in either world

Unlike Welch's first two novels, Fools Crow (1986) is a historical novel set in the 1870s which depicts the character Fools Crow, striving to live a classic Blackfoot life in the background of the white settlement and the U.S. government's war against Plains Indians.

Welch writes part of his own family's history into his third novel, Fools Crow.

Critics frequently write about how to categorize James Welch, whether to see him as a Native American storyteller or as an American author. The truth is that Welch's work exceeds such categorization; he joins Native American traditions and concepts with Western literary conventions to form compelling narratives. Much of Welch's fiction pivots on the interaction between the American Indian and white America.

== Adaptations ==
- Winter in the Blood (1974) was adapted as a 2012 feature film by the same name by filmmakers Alex and Andrew Smith, who knew Welch growing up in Montana. Native American writer Sherman Alexie helped produce the film.

== Accolades ==
- American Book Award, Los Angeles Times Book Prize and the Pacific Northwest Book Award. Fools Crow (1986)
- Emmy Award. Last Stand at Little Bighorn. Documentary.
- 3rd Annual Native American Literature Prize (1991)
- Spur Award from Western Writers of America for Best Television Documentary Script (1992)
- John Dos Passos Prize for Literature (1994)
- Western Literature Association's Distinguished Achievement Award (1994)
- Chevalier de l'ordre des Arts et des Lettres (Knight of the Order of the Arts and Letters) by the French Cultural Ministry (1995)
- Native Writers' Circle of the Americas Lifetime Achievement Award (1997)
- Knight of the Order of Arts and Letters medal by the FBI
- Montana Governor's Humanities Award

== Tribute ==
On November 18, 2016, Google celebrated his 76th birthday with a Google Doodle. In 2021, his wife Lois Welch created a new funding programme for visiting writers in loving memory of her husband.

== Publications ==
=== Novels ===
- Winter in the Blood (1974)
- The Death of Jim Loney (1979)
- Fools Crow (1986)
- The Indian Lawyer (1990)
- The Heartsong of Charging Elk (2000)

=== Nonfiction ===
- Killing Custer: The Battle of Little Bighorn and the Fate of the Plains Indians (1994)

=== Poetry ===
- Riding the Earthboy 40 (1971 rpt. 1975)
- Last Stand at Little Bighorn
- Christmas Comes to Moccasin Flat
- Surviving
- Snow Country Weavers
- Thanksgiving at Snake Butte
- Dreaming Winter
- Harlem, Montana: Just off the Reservation

== See also ==
- List of writers from peoples Indigenous to the Americas
- Native American Studies
