= Fort Belknap Agency, Montana =

- Census-designated place
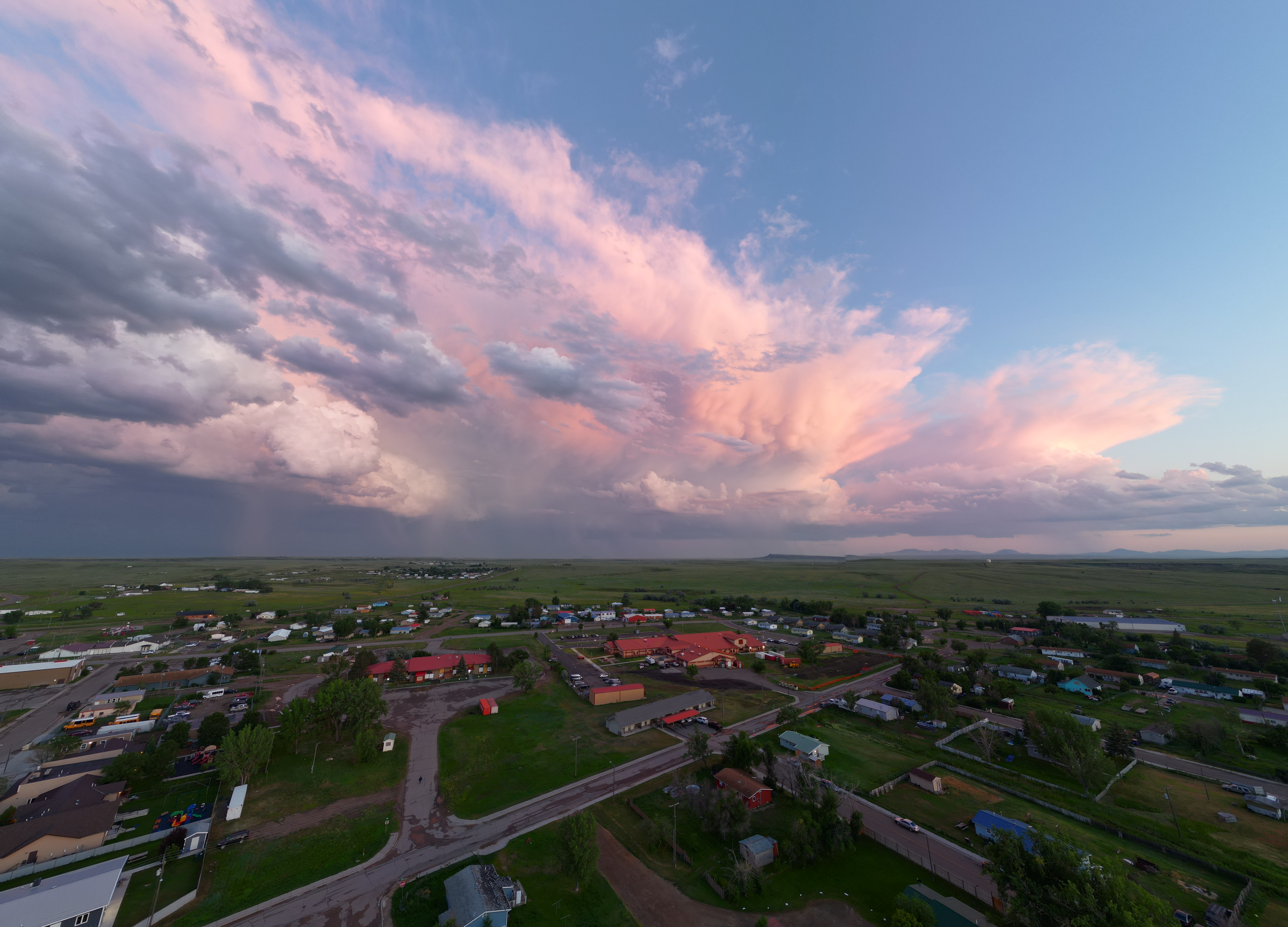

- Location of Fort Belknap Agency, Montana
- Coordinates: 48°25′50″N 108°41′20″W
- Country: United States
- State: Montana
- County: Blaine

Area
  - Total: 45.76 sq mi (118.52 km^{2})
  - Land: 45.50 sq mi (117.85 km^{2})
  - Water: 0.25 sq mi (0.66 km^{2})
- Elevation: 2,562 ft (781 m)

Population (2020)
  - Total: 1,567
  - Density: 34/sq mi (13.3/km^{2})
- Time zone: UTC-7 (Mountain (MST))
  - Summer (DST): UTC-6 (MDT)
- Area code: 406
- FIPS code: 30-27850
- GNIS feature ID: 2408231

Fort Belknap Agency is a census-designated place (CDP) in Blaine County, Montana, United States. As of the 2020 census, its population was 1,567. This is a significant increase from the 2010 census which reported 1,293 residents.

Fort Belknap Agency is the capital of the Fort Belknap Indian Reservation.

== Geography ==
The Milk River forms the CDP's northern border.

According to the United States Census Bureau, the CDP has a total area of 45.8 square miles (118.5 km^{2}), of which 45.5 square miles (117.8 km^{2}) are land and 0.27 square miles (0.7 km^{2}), or 0.56%, is covered by water.

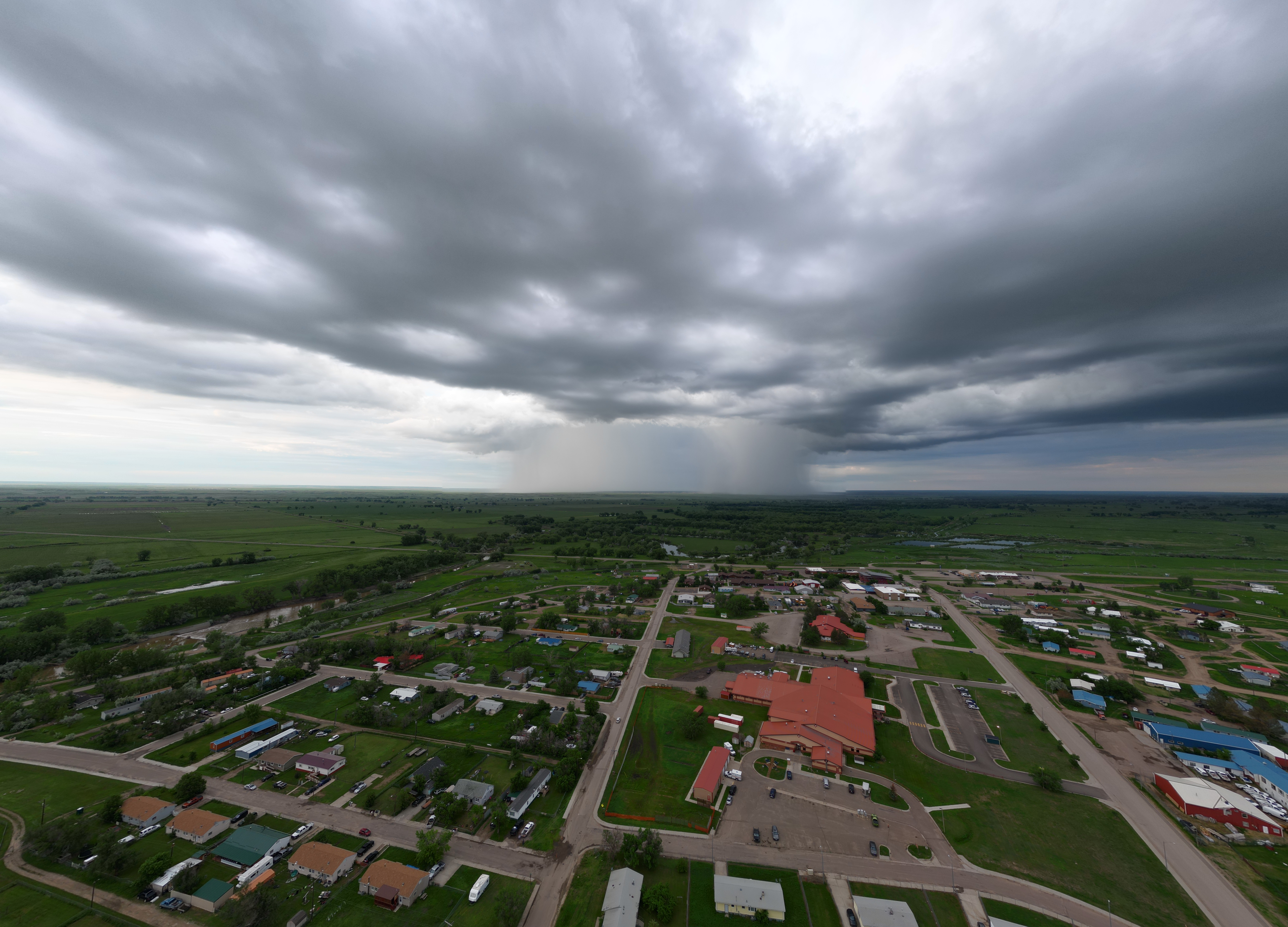
Thunderstorms are common in the spring and summer.

== Infrastructure ==
Fort Belknap Agency is located at the northern end of the reservation at the junction of U.S. Route 2 and Montana Highway 66.

It is the home of facilities such as the Fort Belknap Hospital, an office of the Bureau of Indian Affairs, the Fort Belknap Tribal Council and Tribal Police, and a highway rest area.

The nearest commercial airport is Havre City–County Airport, 50 miles (80 km) east. It offers regional flights only. For full flight service, residents must travel to either Great Falls International Airport or Billings Logan International Airport, both about 200 miles (322 km) away.

== Demographics ==
Historical population
Census	Pop.	Note	%±
2020	1,567		—
U.S. Decennial Census

=== 2020 census ===
As of the 2020 census, Fort Belknap Agency had a population of 1,567. The median age was 27.3 years. 36.3% of residents were under the age of 18 and 9.5% of residents were 65 years of age or older. For every 100 females there were 100.4 males, and for every 100 females age 18 and over there were 99.6 males age 18 and over.

0.0% of residents lived in urban areas, while 100.0% lived in rural areas.

There were 444 households in Fort Belknap Agency, of which 55.2% had children under the age of 18 living in them. Of all households, 24.5% were married-couple households, 25.7% were households with a male householder and no spouse or partner present, and 41.0% were households with a female householder and no spouse or partner present. About 17.2% of all households were made up of individuals and 4.3% had someone living alone who was 65 years of age or older.

There were 484 housing units, of which 8.3% were vacant. The homeowner vacancy rate was 0.0% and the rental vacancy rate was 3.7%.

Racial composition as of the 2020 census
Race	Number	Percent
White	40	2.6%
Black or African American	3	0.2%
American Indian and Alaska Native	1,497	95.5%
Asian	0	0.0%
Native Hawaiian and Other Pacific Islander	0	0.0%
Some other race	4	0.3%
Two or more races	23	1.5%
Hispanic or Latino (of any race)	39	2.5%

=== 2010 census ===
The population was 1,293 at the 2010 census.

=== 2000 census ===
As of the census of 2000, 1,262 people, 345 households, and 287 families were residing in the CDP. The population density was 116.4 people/sq mi (45.0/km^{2}). The 380 housing units averaged 35.1/sq mi (13.5/km^{2}). The racial makeup of the CDP was 2.61% White, 0.32% African American, 95.64% Native American, 0.08% Asian, 0.16% Pacific Islander, and 1.19% from two or more races. Hispanics or Latinos of any race were 1.51% of the population.

Of the 345 households, 50.7% had children under the age of 18 living with them, 40.9% were married couples living together, 32.8% had a female householder with no husband present, and 16.8% were not families. About 14.2% of all households were made up of individuals, and 3.2% had someone living alone who was 65 years of age or older. The average household size was 3.64, and the average family size was 4.00.

In the CDP, the age distribution was 41.8% under 18, 12.4% from 18 to 24, 25.2% from 25 to 44, 16.3% from 45 to 64, and 4.3% who were 65 or older. The median age was 22 years. For every 100 females, there were 90.6 males. For every 100 females age 18 and over, there were 88.9 males.

The median income for a household in the CDP was $22,000, and for a family was $23,583. Males had a median income of $26,364 versus $20,833 for females. The per capita income for the CDP was $9,053. About 37.9% of families and 38.3% of the population were below the poverty line, including 39.0% of those under age 18 and 56.1% of those age 65 or over.

== Education ==
It is in the Harlem Elementary School District and the Harlem High School District. Both are components of Harlem Public Schools.

Students from kindergarten to 12th grade attend public school in Harlem,

Aaniiih Nakoda College offers associate degrees in eleven disciplines and vocational training in five others.

== Media ==
The FM radio station KGVA is licensed in Fort Belknap Agency.

== Notable people ==
- George Horse Capture, Native American anthropologist and writer, place of birth
- James Welch, Native American author, attended school
