= Gros Ventre language =

Extinct Arapahoan language

Gros Ventre
- 'ɔ'ɔ́ɔ́ɔ́naakíit'ɔ
- Native to: United States
- Region: Montana
- Ethnicity: Gros Ventre
- Extinct: 2007, with the death of Theresa Lamebull
- Revival: 45 self-identified speakers (2009–2013)
- Language family: Algic: Algonquian; Arapahoan; Arapaho–Gros Ventre; Gros Ventre

Official status
- Official language in: United States (Fort Belknap Indian Community, Montana)

Language codes
- ISO 639-3: ats
- Glottolog: gros1243
- ELP: Gros Ventre
- Historical extent of the language

- Gros Ventre is classified as Critically Endangered by the UNESCO Atlas of the World's Languages in Danger.

Atsina, or Gros Ventre (/ˈɡroʊvɒnt/ GROH-vont; French: [ɡʁo vɑ̃tʁ]; also known as Aaniiih, Ananin, Ahahnelin, Ahe, A’ani, and ʔɔʔɔɔɔniiih), is the ancestral language of the Gros Ventre people of what is today Montana. The last fluent speaker, Theresa Lamebull, died in 2007, though revitalization efforts are underway.

== History ==
Atsina is the name applied by specialists in Algonquian linguistics. Arapaho and Atsina are dialects of a common language usually designated by scholars as "Arapaho-Atsina". Historically, this language had five dialects, and on occasion specialists add a third dialect name to the label, resulting in the designation, "Arapaho-Atsina-Nawathinehena". Compared with Arapaho proper, Gros Ventre had three additional phonemes /tʲ/, /ts/, /kʲ/, and /bʲ/, and lacked the velar fricative /x/.

Theresa Lamebull taught the language at Fort Belknap College (now Aaniiih Nakoda College), and helped develop a dictionary using the Phraselator when she was 109.

As of 2012, the White Clay Immersion School at Aaniiih Nakoda College was teaching the language to 26 students, up from 11 students in 2006.

== Phonology ==
=== Consonants ===
		Bilabial	Dental	Alveolar	Palatal	Velar	Glottal
Plosive	plain	b ⟨b⟩		t ⟨t⟩		k ⟨k⟩	ʔ ⟨’⟩
Plosive	palatalized	bʲ ⟨bʸ⟩		tʲ ⟨tʸ⟩		kʲ ⟨kʸ⟩	
Fricative			θ ⟨3⟩	s ⟨s⟩			h ⟨h⟩
Affricate				ts ⟨c⟩	tʃ ⟨č⟩		
Nasal				n ⟨n⟩			
Approximant		w ⟨w⟩			j ⟨y⟩		

=== Vowels ===
	Short	Long
Close	ɪ ⟨i⟩	iː ⟨ii⟩
Mid	ɛ ⟨e⟩	eː ⟨ee⟩
Back	ɔ ⟨o⟩	oː ⟨oo⟩
Back	ʊ ⟨u⟩	uː ⟨uu⟩
