= Hays, Montana =

Hays, Montana ’ɔ’ɔ́ɔ́ɔ́nííítaanɔ’ (Gros Ventre)
- Census-designated place
- Location of Hays, Montana
- Coordinates: 48°00′40″N 108°38′38″W
- Country: United States
- State: Montana
- County: Blaine

Area
  - Total: 27.10 sq mi (70.18 km^{2})
  - Land: 27.10 sq mi (70.18 km^{2})
  - Water: 0 sq mi (0.00 km^{2})
- Elevation: 3,934 ft (1,199 m)

Population (2020)
  - Total: 996
  - Density: 36.8/sq mi (14.19/km^{2})
- Time zone: UTC-7 (Mountain (MST))
  - Summer (DST): UTC-6 (MDT)
- ZIP code: 59527
- Area code: 406
- FIPS code: 30-35275
- GNIS feature ID: 2408362

Hays (Gros Ventre: ’ɔ’ɔ́ɔ́ɔ́nííítaanɔ’, Assiniboine: Aką́ta or Tʿoktʿí) is a census-designated place (CDP) in Blaine County, Montana, United States. The population was 843 at the 2010 census. The community lies within the Fort Belknap Indian Reservation, near the reservation's southern end. The nearby community of Lodge Pole lies to the east.

The town was named for Major Hays. The Bureau of Catholic Indian Missions built St. Paul's Mission Church at Hays in 1887.

== Geography ==
According to the United States Census Bureau, the CDP has a total area of 27.1 square miles (70.1 km^{2}), all land.

== Demographics ==
Historical population
Census	Pop.	Note	%±
2020	996		—
U.S. Decennial Census

As of the census of 2000, there were 702 people, 188 households, and 153 families residing in the CDP. This rose to 843 in the 2010 census and 996 in 2020. The 2000 population density was 53.9 inhabitants per square mile (20.8/km^{2}). There were 207 housing units at an average density of 15.9 per square mile (6.1/km^{2}). The racial makeup of the CDP was 5.27% White, 94.59% Native American, and 0.14% from two or more races. Hispanic or Latino of any race were 0.28% of the population.

While Hays is located on a reservation belonging to both Assiniboine people and Gros Ventre people, the community itself is primarily inhabited by Gros Ventre, while nearby Lodge Pole is home to Assiniboine people.

There were 188 households, out of which 51.1% had children under the age of 18 living with them, 42.6% were married couples living together, 30.9% had a female householder with no husband present, and 18.6% were non-families. 16.5% of all households were made up of individuals, and 6.4% had someone living alone who was 65 years of age or older. The average household size was 3.71 and the average family size was 4.16.

In the CDP, the population was spread out, with 44.0% under the age of 18, 9.8% from 18 to 24, 28.3% from 25 to 44, 12.3% from 45 to 64, and 5.6% who were 65 years of age or older. The median age was 22 years. For every 100 females, there were 104.7 males. For every 100 females age 18 and over, there were 94.6 males.

The median income for a household in the CDP was $17,000, and the median income for a family was $20,000. Males had a median income of $25,250 versus $21,500 for females. The per capita income for the CDP was $6,489. About 44.1% of families and 50.4% of the population were below the poverty line, including 60.0% of those under age 18 and 48.8% of those age 65 or over.

== Education ==
It is in the Hays-Lodge Pole K-12 Schools school district.

The district, with facilities in Hays, educates students from kindergarten through 12th grade. The high school is Hays-Lodgepole High School. They are known as the Thunderbirds.

== Notable person ==
- Theresa Lamebull, one of the last native speakers of the Gros Ventre language, was born in Hays in 1896.
