= Fort Belknap Indian Reservation =

Fort Belknap Indian Reservation ’akθɔ́ɔyɔ́ɔ (Gros Ventre)
- Indian reservation
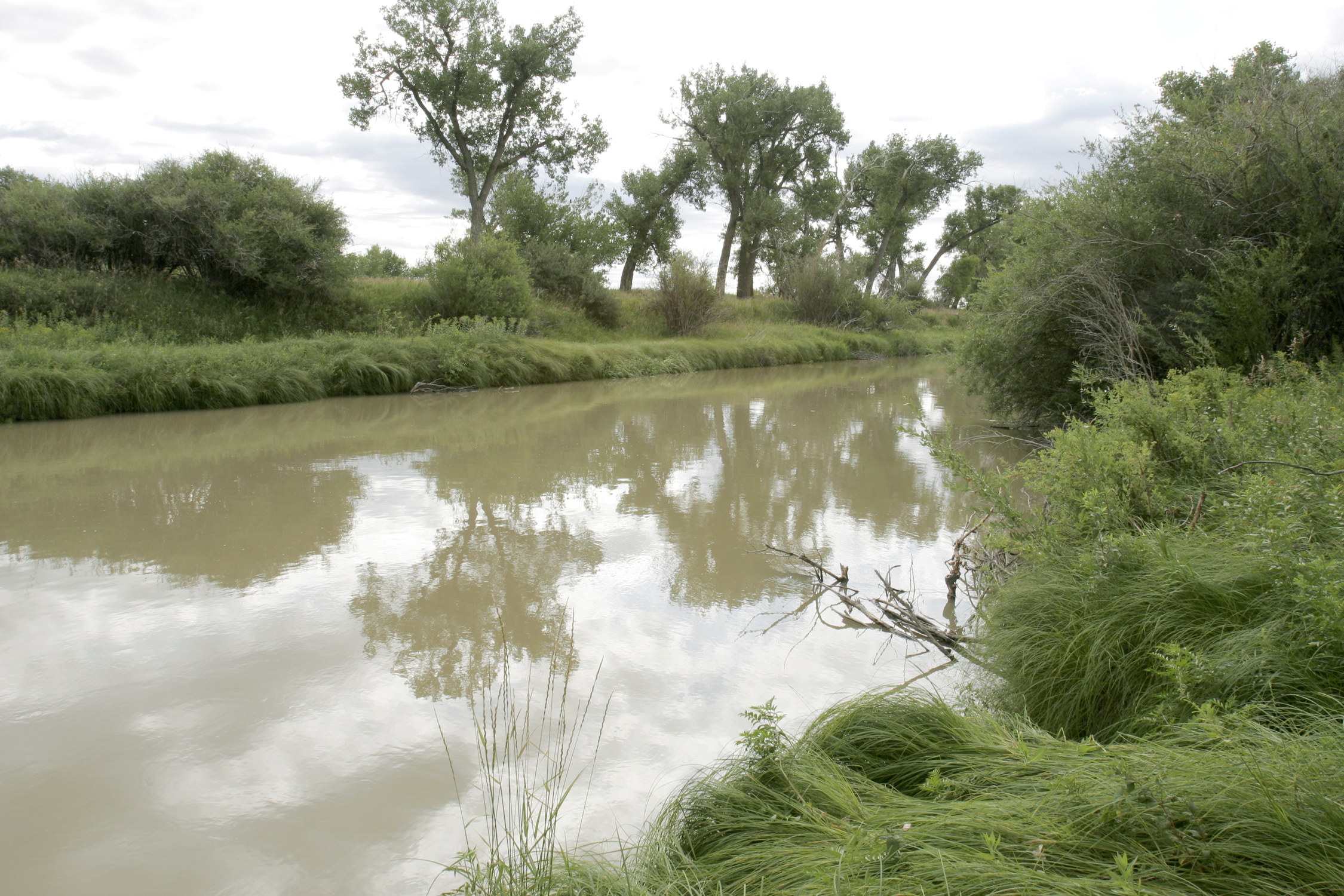
- River in Fort Belknap Indian Reservation

- Location in Montana
- Coordinates: 48.2°N 108.6°W
- Tribes: Fort Belknap Indian Community: Assiniboine (Nakoda); Gros Ventre (Aaniiih)
- Country: United States
- State: Montana
- Counties: Blaine; Phillips
- Established: June 1, 1888
- Tribal Council: 1904
- Headquarters: Fort Belknap Agency

Government
  - President: Jeffrey Stiffarm Sr.

Area
  - Total: 1,014.064 sq mi (2,626.41 km^{2})

Population (2017)
  - Total: 3,182
  - Density: 3.138/sq mi (1.212/km^{2})
- Website: ftbelknap.org

Montana Indian Reservations

The Fort Belknap Indian Reservation (Gros Ventre: ’akθɔ́ɔyɔ́ɔ, lit. 'the fence' or ’ɔ’ɔ́ɔ́ɔ́nííítaan’ɔ, 'Gros Ventre tribe') is shared by two Native American tribes, the A'aninin (Gros Ventre) and the Nakoda (Assiniboine). The reservation covers 1,014 sq mi (2,630 km^{2}), and is located in north-central Montana. The total area includes the main portion of their homeland and off-reservation trust land. Combined enrollment was about 4,000 members in 2026. The headquarters and largest community is Fort Belknap Agency, at the reservation's north end. It is just south of the city of Harlem, Montana, across the Milk River.

In 2013, the tribes received some bison and have reintroduced them to the local range. In June 2015, the U.S. Department of the Interior sent some 3500 offers to buy back fractionated land worth more than $54 million, affecting the future control of 26,000 tracts of land within the boundaries of the Fort Belknap Indian Reservation. This was under the Land Buy-Back Program for Tribal Nations, established as part of the federal government's 2009 settlement of the landmark Cobell v. Salazar suit over federal mismanagement of revenues due Indian landowners under the trust program.

== History ==
In October 1855, near the confluence of the Judith and Missouri Rivers, the Blackfoot Confederacy signed an agreement to remain at peace with other Native American tribes and with citizens of the United States. The Nakoda Nation, along with the Lakota, Dakota, Mandan, Arikara, Hidatsa, Cheyenne, and Arapaho, had signed the Treaty of Fort Laramie in 1851 with the United States government in what is now North Dakota. These treaties established the tribes' sacred territories within the continental United States.

The Fort Belknap Reservation was established in 1888 in north-central Montana. It comprises a small portion of their vast ancestral territory. Their former territory extended across all of north-central and eastern Montana and portions of western North Dakota. Fort Belknap Reservation was named after William W. Belknap, the secretary of war in President Ulysses S. Grant's administration. Belknap was later impeached for corruption.

The origins of the name Aaniiih, (meaning the White Clay People) is unclear. Many believe that they painted themselves with white clay found along the Saskatchewan River for ceremony, like the northern Arapaho. Early French fur trappers and traders named this tribe Gros Ventre. Other tribes in the area referred to them as the " Water Falls People". Lacking a common language, they used physical signs to indicate some terms. The sign for waterfall was the passing of the hands over the stomach. The French traders interpreted this as meaning "big belly" and called the Aaniiih the Gros Ventre, meaning "big belly" in the French language.

The Nakoda (meaning the Generous Ones) split with the Yanktonai Sioux in the 17th century. They migrated from the Minnesota woodlands westward onto the northern plains with their allies, the Plains Cree. The Chippewa called the Nakoda as the Assiniboine people in their language, an Ojibwe word meaning "one who cooks with stones". The Nakoda would heat rocks and put them in rawhide pots to heat water and cook food. The Nakoda peoples live on both the Fort Belknap and Fort Peck Indian Reservations in Montana and on several reserves in Saskatchewan and Alberta, Canada, where they are generally known as Stoney.

The Aaniiih and Nakoda were nomadic hunters and warriors. They followed the bison, commonly called buffalo, for seasonal hunting; they made use of all parts of the massive animals, for food, clothing, cord, tools, etc. Their food, clothing, and teepees were all derived from the buffalo. The buffalo was the Indian "staff of life", supporting the nomadic cultures of the Nakoda, Aaniih, and other Plains tribes. The last wild herd of buffalo in the continental United States in the 19th century roamed between the Bear Paw Mountains and the Little Rocky Mountains in the lush Milk River valley of Montana.

Map of the Fort Belknap Indian Reservation and nearby reservations (In dark blue).

== Economy and landholdings ==
The two tribes are united as one federally recognized government called the Fort Belknap Indian Community. Together, the tribes have formed and maintained a community that has deep respect for its land, its culture, and its heritage. Fort Belknap derives its name from the original military and trading post established on the Milk River. The town of Harlem, Montana, developed about 1 mi (2 km) northeast of the fort.

The Bureau of Indian Affairs and the tribe are the major employers. The Little Rockies Meat Packing Company is the first tribally owned, USDA-inspected meat packing facility in the US. The main industry is agriculture, consisting of cattle ranches, raising alfalfa hay for feed and larger dry land farms.

=== Land Buy-Back Program ===
Generations after allotment was made of communal lands 94 years ago to individual tribal households under the Dawes Act, control has become split up among thousands of descendants of original allottees in many federally recognized tribes. The Fort Belknap Reservation has been described as one of the most fractionated in the country in terms of its landholdings, with an estimated 75% of land on the reservation being fractionated under individual owners.

As part of the 2009 settlement of the Cobell v. Salazar class-action suit, the Department of Interior has set up the Land Buy-Back Program for Tribal Nations to buy back such fractionated land from descendants, on a purely voluntary basis, with market value being offered. The land portions of those who accept the offers will be put in federal trust under control of the tribe, so it can increase the communal land base and improve its ability to manage resources for its members. In 2015, "[m]ore than 3,500 buy-back offers were mailed to tribal landowners at the beginning of June. Some amounted to less than $100, others total tens or even hundreds of thousands [of dollars]." In June 2015, Interior employees came to the reservation to discuss the program in more detail. They reviewed up to $54 million in offers with landowners who may be interested in selling their portions. These offers apply to 26,000 tracts of land, most very small, within the boundaries of the Fort Belknap reservation.

Margey Azure, tribal coordinator of the program, believes it can help both individuals and the tribe. She said, "We're in a position where we can consolidate these lands, and maybe even help some young Indian operators get started in the cattle ranching business or something like that."

=== Bison and grasslands restoration ===
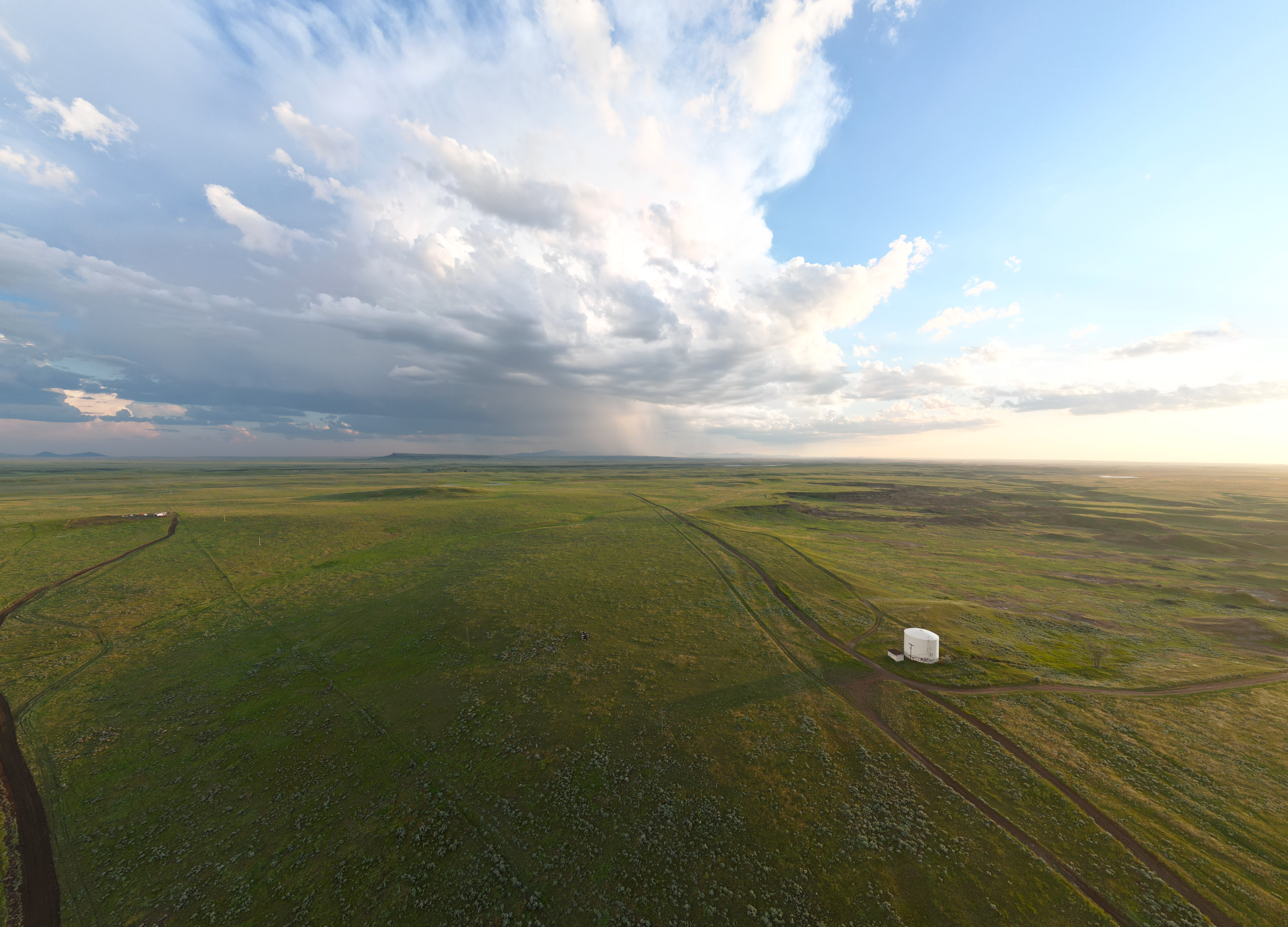
The Fort Belknap Indian Reservation is largely vast grasslands. Photo by Lukas Eddy

In March 2012, the Fort Belknap community received a herd of pure-bred plains bison (Bison bison bison) from Yellowstone National Park that had been quarantined at the Fort Peck Indian Reservation. The tribes on these reservations introduced the bison to their local ranges, a century after they were exterminated in the area. The Fort Belknap Indian Community Grassland Restoration Project is a partnership between the reservation and the Bureau of Land Management. In September 2014, the tribes of the reservation became one of the original eight signatories to the Buffalo Treaty. In December 2021, 30 swift fox (Vulpes velox) individuals from Colorado were transported to the reserve and reintroduced, after swift foxes were extirpated from the area 50 years before. Black-footed ferrets have also been reintroduced.

== Government ==
The Fort Belknap Indian Community Council consists of the President and the Vice President, who are elected to serve a four year term. Eight Council Members, consisting of four Gros Ventres and four Assiniboine members are elected every two years. The President and Vice President appoint a Secretary Treasurer, who serves four years.

Randall Werk Sr. was President in 2025.

== Education ==
The Aaniiih Nakoda College community college is located at Fort Belknap Agency.

== Communities ==
- Fort Belknap Agency
- Hays
- Lodge Pole

=== Events ===
Annual celebrations include Lodgepole Pow Wow in June. Milk River Indian Days in July and Hays Pow Wow in August.

== Notable Aaniiih ==
- Minerva Allen (1934 – 2024), poet and educator
- George Horse-Capture (1937 – 2013), an anthropologist and author, became a curator at the Plains Indian Museum and the National Museum of the American Indian.
- Theresa Lamebull (1896 – August 2007), a supercentenarian, was believed to have been be the oldest living member of the A'aninin Tribe of Montana and possibly the oldest Native American ever recorded.
- James Welch (1940 – August 4, 2003) was an award-winning author and poet. He wrote the novel Winter in the Blood
