= Lodge Pole, Montana =

Lodge Pole, Montana Wasé Wakpá Oyą́ke (Assiniboine)
- Census-designated place
- Location of Lodge Pole, Montana
- Coordinates: 48°00′45″N 108°33′27″W
- Country: United States
- State: Montana
- County: Blaine

Area
  - Total: 13.39 sq mi (34.68 km^{2})
  - Land: 13.39 sq mi (34.68 km^{2})
  - Water: 0 sq mi (0.00 km^{2})
- Elevation: 3,498 ft (1,066 m)

Population (2020)
  - Total: 294
  - Density: 22.0/sq mi (8.48/km^{2})
- Time zone: UTC-7 (Mountain (MST))
  - Summer (DST): UTC-6 (MDT)
- Area code: 406
- FIPS code: 30-44350
- GNIS feature ID: 2408627

Lodge Pole (Assiniboine: Wasé Wakpá Oyą́ke, Gros Ventre: nɔ́ɔ́kinéíhííítaan’ɔ) is a census-designated place (CDP) in Blaine County, Montana, United States. The population was 294 at 2020 census, up from 265 at the 2010 census. It lies within the Fort Belknap Indian Reservation, near the reservation's southern end.

While Lodge Pole is located on a reservation belonging to both Assiniboine people and Gros Ventre people, the community itself is primarily inhabited by Assiniboine people, while nearby Hays is home to Gros Ventre.

There was a post office as early as 1899.

== Geography ==
According to the United States Census Bureau, the CDP has a total area of 13.4 square miles (34.7 km^{2}), all land.

== Demographics ==
Historical population
Census	Pop.	Note	%±
2020	294		—
U.S. Decennial Census

As of the census of 2000, there were 214 people, 59 households, and 48 families residing in the CDP. The population density was 16.0 inhabitants per square mile (6.2/km^{2}). There were 69 housing units at an average density of 5.2 per square mile (2.0/km^{2}). The racial makeup of the CDP was 2.34% White, 96.73% Native American, and 0.93% from two or more races.

There were 59 households, out of which 50.8% had children under the age of 18 living with them, 42.4% were married couples living together, 25.4% had a female householder with no husband present, and 18.6% were non-families. 16.9% of all households were made up of individuals, and 1.7% had someone living alone who was 65 years of age or older. The average household size was 3.63 and the average family size was 3.90.

In the CDP, the population was spread out, with 45.3% under the age of 18, 5.1% from 18 to 24, 27.1% from 25 to 44, 16.4% from 45 to 64, and 6.1% who were 65 years of age or older. The median age was 24 years. For every 100 females, there were 94.5 males. For every 100 females age 18 and over, there were 91.8 males.

The median income for a household in the CDP was $21,607, and the median income for a family was $22,500. Males had a median income of $21,250 versus $19,375 for females. The per capita income for the CDP was $6,276. About 44.0% of families and 40.9% of the population were below the poverty line, including 42.7% of those under the age of eighteen and 77.8% of those 65 or over.

== Education ==
Lodge Pole is part of the Hays Lodgepole School District. Both the elementary and Jr./Sr. high school are located in Hays.
