= Aaniiih Nakoda College =

Tribal community college in Harlem, Montana, US

Aaniiih Nakoda College (formerly Fort Belknap College)
- Type: Public tribal land-grant community college
- Established: 1984
- Affiliations: Atsina (Gros Ventre) and the Assiniboine
- Academic affiliations: American Indian Higher Education Consortium; American Association of Community Colleges; Space-grant
- President: Sean Chandler
- Location: Harlem, Montana, United States; 48°29′04″N 108°45′32″W
- Campus: Rural
- Website: www.ancollege.edu

Aaniiih Nakoda College (ANC, formerly Fort Belknap College) is a public tribal land-grant community college on the Fort Belknap Indian Reservation in Harlem, Montana. The institution incorporates native culture into the curriculum to promote cultural identity while being open to both tribal and non-tribal members. Aaniiih Nakoda College is a member of the American Indian Higher Education Consortium (AIHEC), which is a community of tribally and federally chartered institutions working to strengthen tribal nations and make a lasting difference in the lives of American Indians and Alaska Natives. ANC was created in response to the higher education needs of American Indians. ANC generally serves geographically isolated populations that have no other means accessing education beyond the high school level.

== History ==
Aaniiih Nakoda College was founded in 1984 by men and women from the Fort Belknap Indian Community Council, Fort Belknap Education Department, and Fort Belknap campus of Dull Knife Memorial College (now Chief Dull Knife College). The leaders wanted to start their own college since off-reservation programs were not adequately meeting the post-secondary educational needs of the community. Today, the college provides academic and vocational training programs and services. The college was charged with preserving and promoting the A'anin and Nakoda languages, cultures and histories. The college has hired many talented young people from within the community since the college is dedicated to a "grow your own" philosophy of developing the community's future leaders.

== Academics ==
ANC offers associate degrees in eleven disciplines and vocational training in five others through the Native American Career and Technical Education Program.

== Sponsored programs ==
- Fort Belknap Extension Program: Part of the college demonstration farm established in 1998 currently focused on alternative crop research and is one of many Federally Recognized Tribes Extension Programs funded by the USDA
- Fort Belknap Tech Department
- Global Information Systems (GIS)/ Global Positioning Systems (GPS) Program: (est. 1996)
- Natural Resources
- KGVA 88.1 FM: Public radio station serving the Fort Belknap Indian Reservation
- Tribal Colleges & Universities Program (T-CUP): "provides awards to enhance the quality of science, technology, engineering and mathematics (STEM) instructional and outreach programs at Tribal Colleges and Universities, Alaskan Native-serving Institutions and Native Hawaiian-serving institutions."
- Basketball: In August 2010 Fort Belknap College, along with the other tribal colleges around Montana, formed the Montana Tribal Colleges Basketball League Presently, the college only has a men's team.
- Administration for Native Americans (ANA): Program ran through the department of Health and Human Services with the goal of promoting self-sufficiency and cultural preservation for Native Americans through economic development and technology.
- Head Start Program, initiated by Minerva Allen in 1969
- Teacher Training
