= Gros Ventre =

Native American group of north-central Montana

Aaniiih ʔɔʔɔɔ̋ɔ́niinénnɔh
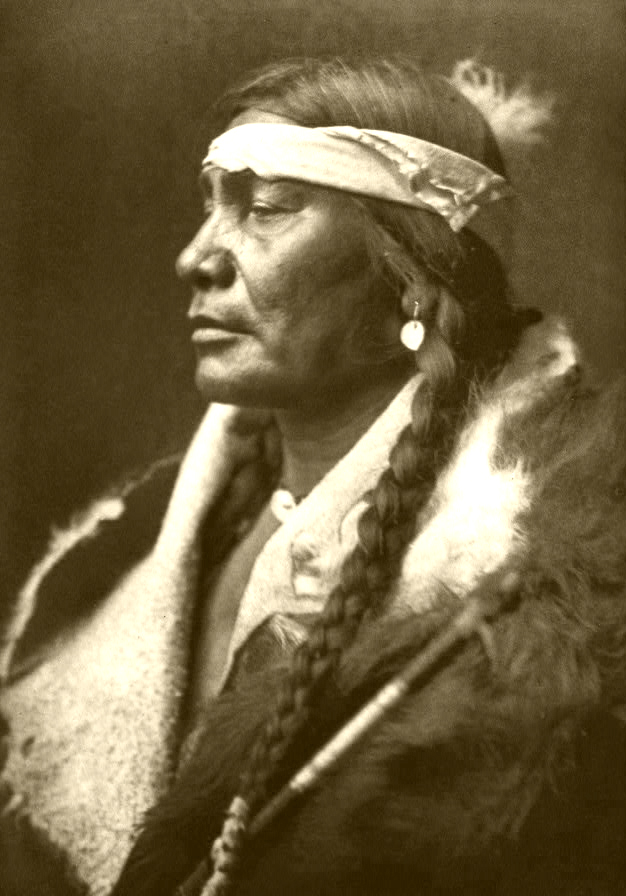
- Assiniboin Boy, a Gros Ventre man, photo by Edward S. Curtis

Total population
- 3,682 (2000 census)

Regions with significant populations
- United States (Montana)

Languages
- English, Gros Ventre

Religion
- Roman Catholicism, Sun Dance, traditional religion

Related ethnic groups
- Arapaho, Cheyenne

The Gros Ventre (US: /ˈɡroʊvɒnt/ GROH-vont; French: [ɡʁo vɑ̃tʁ], meaning 'big belly'), also known as the A'aninin, Atsina, (Note: Or Achena.) or White Clay, are a historically Algonquian-speaking Native American tribe located in northcentral Montana. Today, the Gros Ventre people are enrolled in the Fort Belknap Indian Community of the Fort Belknap Reservation of Montana, a federally recognized tribe with 7,000 members, also including the Assiniboine people.

== Names ==
The name used by the Gros Ventre, ʔɔʔɔɔ̋ɔ́niinénnɔh means "White Clay People". It has a variety of transliterations, including A'aninin, Aaniiih, Haaninin, Aainen, Aa'ninena, and Aaninena.

The French used the term Gros Ventre, which was mistakenly interpreted from sign language. They were once known as the "Gros Ventres of the Prairies", as the Hidatsa people were similarly called the "Gros Ventres of the Missouri".

After their split from the Gros Ventres, the Arapaho called them Hitúnĕna. Possible meanings range from "beggars," "hunger," "waterfall," and "big bellies."

== History ==
The Gros Ventres are believed to have lived in the western Great Lakes region 3,000 years ago, where they lived an agrarian lifestyle, cultivating maize. With the ancestors of the Arapaho, they formed a single Algonquian-speaking people who lived along the Red River Valley in present-day Minnesota and North Dakota. In Ojibwa oral history they are known as the "men of the olden time" that occupied the lands surrounding the head waters of the Mississippi River. They were closely associated with the ancestors of the Cheyenne. They spoke the now nearly extinct Gros Ventre language (Atsina), a closely related Plains Algonquian language, much like the Arapaho, and is grouped as an Arapahoan language (Arapaho-Atsina). There is evidence that, together with bands of Northern Arapaho, a southern tribal group, the Staetan, spoke the Besawunena dialect, which had speakers among the Northern Arapaho as recently as the late 1920s.

=== 18th century ===
In the early 18th century, the combined tribe came under pressure from the Ojibwe, and started a migration to the upper Missouri River Valley. During the migration, the large tribe split into the Arapaho and the Gros Ventre, possibly near Devil's Lake. These groups, along with the Cheyenne, were among the last to migrate into Montana, due to pressure from the Ojibwe.

After they migrated to Montana, the Arapaho moved southwards to the Wyoming and Colorado area. The Cheyenne who migrated with the Gros Ventre and Arapaho also migrated onwards. The Gros Ventre were reported living in two north–south tribal groups – the so-called Fall Indians (Canadian or northern group, Hahá-tonwan) of 260 tipis (2,500 population) traded with the North West Company on the Upper Saskatchewan River and roamed between the Missouri and Bow River, and the so-called Staetan tribe (American or southern group) of 40 tipis (400 population) living in close contact with bands (which would become the later Northern Arapaho) and roamed the headwaters of the Loup River, a branch of the North Platte River (Lewis and Clark 1806).

The Gros Ventre acquired horses in the mid-18th century. The earliest known contact of Gros Ventre with whites was around 1754, between the north and south forks of the Saskatchewan River. Exposure to smallpox severely reduced their numbers. Around 1793, in response to attacks by well-armed Cree and Assiniboines, large groups of Gros Ventre burned two Hudson's Bay Company trading posts that were providing guns to the Cree and Assiniboine in what is now Saskatchewan.

=== 19th century ===
In 1832, the Gros Ventre made contact with the German explorer and naturalist, Prince Maximilian. Along with the naturalist painter Karl Bodmer, the Europeans painted portraits and recorded their meeting with the Gros Ventre, near the Missouri River in Montana.

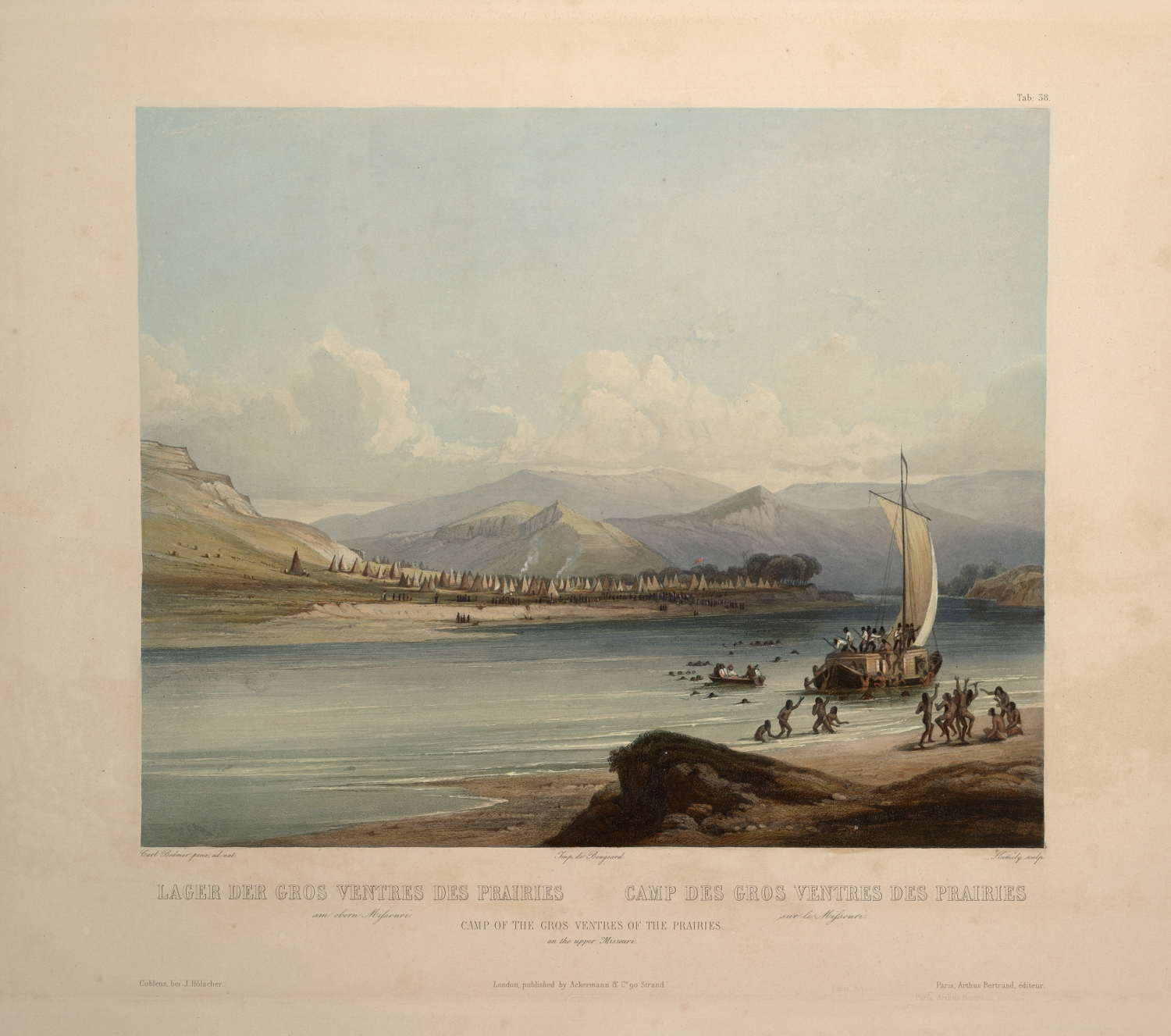
Camp of the Gros Ventres of the Prairies on the upper Missouri. (circa 1832): aquatint by Karl Bodmer from the book "Maximilian, Prince of Wied’s Travels in the Interior of North America, during the years 1832–1834"

The Gros Ventres joined the Blackfoot Confederacy, after which they moved to north-central Montana and southern Canada. In 1855, Isaac Stevens, Territorial Governor of the Washington Territory, signed a treaty (11 Stat. 657) to make peace between the United States and the Blackfoot, Flathead and Nez Perce tribes. The Gros Ventres signed the treaty as part of the Blackfoot Confederacy, whose territory near the Three Fork area became a common hunting ground for the combined peoples. A common hunting ground north of the Missouri River on the Fort Peck Indian Reservation included the Assiniboine and Sioux. In 1861, the Gros Ventres left the Blackfoot Confederacy.

Allying with the Crow, the Gros Ventres fought the Blackfoot but in 1867, they were defeated.

In 1868, the United States government established a trading post called Fort Browning near the mouth of Peoples Creek on the Milk River. This trading post was built for the Gros Ventres and Assiniboines, but because it was on a favorite hunting ground of the Sioux, it was abandoned in 1871. The government then built Fort Belknap, which was established on the south side of the Milk River, about one mile southwest of the present town site of Harlem, Montana. Fort Belknap was a substation post, with half of the structure being a trading post. A block house stood to the left of the stockade gate. At the right was a warehouse and an issue building, where the tribe received their rations and annuity goods.

In 1876, the fort was discontinued and the Gros Ventre and Assiniboine people receiving annuities at the post were instructed to go to the agency at Fort Peck and Wolf Point. The Assiniboines readily did so, but the Gros Ventres refused, fearing coming into conflict with the nearby Sioux. They chose to forfeit their annuities rather than move to Fort Peck. In 1878, the Fort Belknap Agency was re-established, and the Gros Ventres, and remaining Assiniboines were again allowed to receive supplies at Fort Belknap.

White Eagle, "the last major Chief of the Gros Ventre people", died "at the mouth of the Judith River" on February 9, 1881.

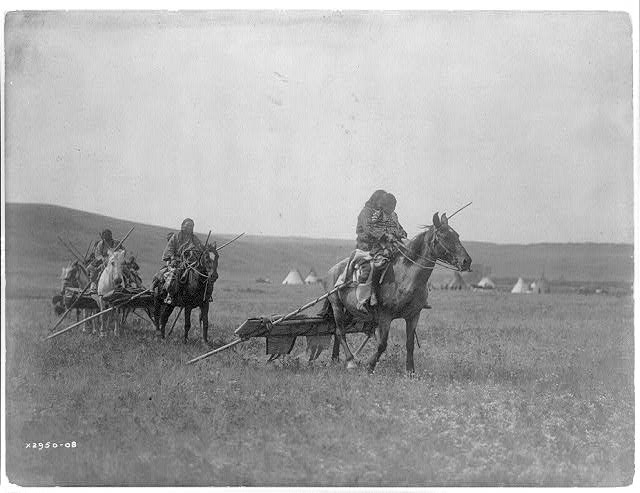
Gros Ventre moving camp on horses rigged with travois.

In 1884, gold was discovered in the Little Rocky Mountains. Pressure from miners and mining companies forced the tribes to cede sections of the mountains in 1885. Jesuits came to Fort Belknap in 1862 to convert the Gros Ventre people to Roman Catholicism. In 1887, St. Paul's Mission was established at the foot of the Little Rocky Mountains, near Hays. The mission repressed traditional ceremonies and culture Two sacred pipes, The Feathered Pipe and The Flat Pipe, still remain central to the traditional spiritual beliefs of the Gros Ventres.

In 1888, the Fort Belknap Indian Reservation was established by an act of Congress on May 1, 1888 (Stat., L., XXV, 113). The Blackfoot, Gros Ventre, and Assiniboine tribes under coercion ceded a combined 17,500,000 acres of their joint reservation and were allowed to live on three smaller reservations. These are now known as the Blackfoot Confederacy, the Fort Peck Indian Reservation and the Fort Belknap Indian Reservation.

=== 20th century ===
By 1904, there were only 535 Gros Ventre tribe members remaining. The tribe has since revived, with a substantial increase in population.

=== 21st century ===
In March 2012, 63 American bison from Yellowstone National Park were transferred to prairie on the Fort Peck Indian Reservation, to be released to a 2,100-acre game preserve 25 miles north of Poplar. There are numerous other bison herds outside Yellowstone, but the herd transferred is one of the very few not cross-bred with cattle. Many celebrated the move, over a century after bison were nearly made extinct by White settlers and the government. The Assiniboine and Gros Ventre tribes at the Fort Belknap Indian Reservation also received a portion of the herd.

Map of the Fort Belknap Reservation and nearby reservations (In blue).

== Government ==
The reservation government of Fort Belknap has an elected community council with 4 Gros Ventre members and 4 Assiniboine, for a total of 8 elected members of the council. The officers of the council are the President, Vice President, and Secretary-Treasurer, with the Secretary-Treasurer being appointed by the president and confirmed by the council. The secretary-treasurer, as the only appointed officer, may not vote on council matters.

The constitution and bylaws of the Fort Belknap Indian Reservation were ratified on September 25, 1935, and adopted on October 19, 1935.

== Notable Gros Ventre ==
- Theresa Lamebull (c. 1896–2007), fluent speaker of the Gros Ventre language
- George Horse Capture (1937–2013), anthropologist and author
- James Welch (1940–2003), Blackfoot-Gros Ventre author
- Jamie Fox, Métis fiddler
- Joseph P. Gone (b. 1967), clinical and cultural psychologist

== See also ==
- List of federally recognized tribes in the contiguous United States
