= Assiniboine =

Indigenous people of the Northern Plains of the U.S. and Canada

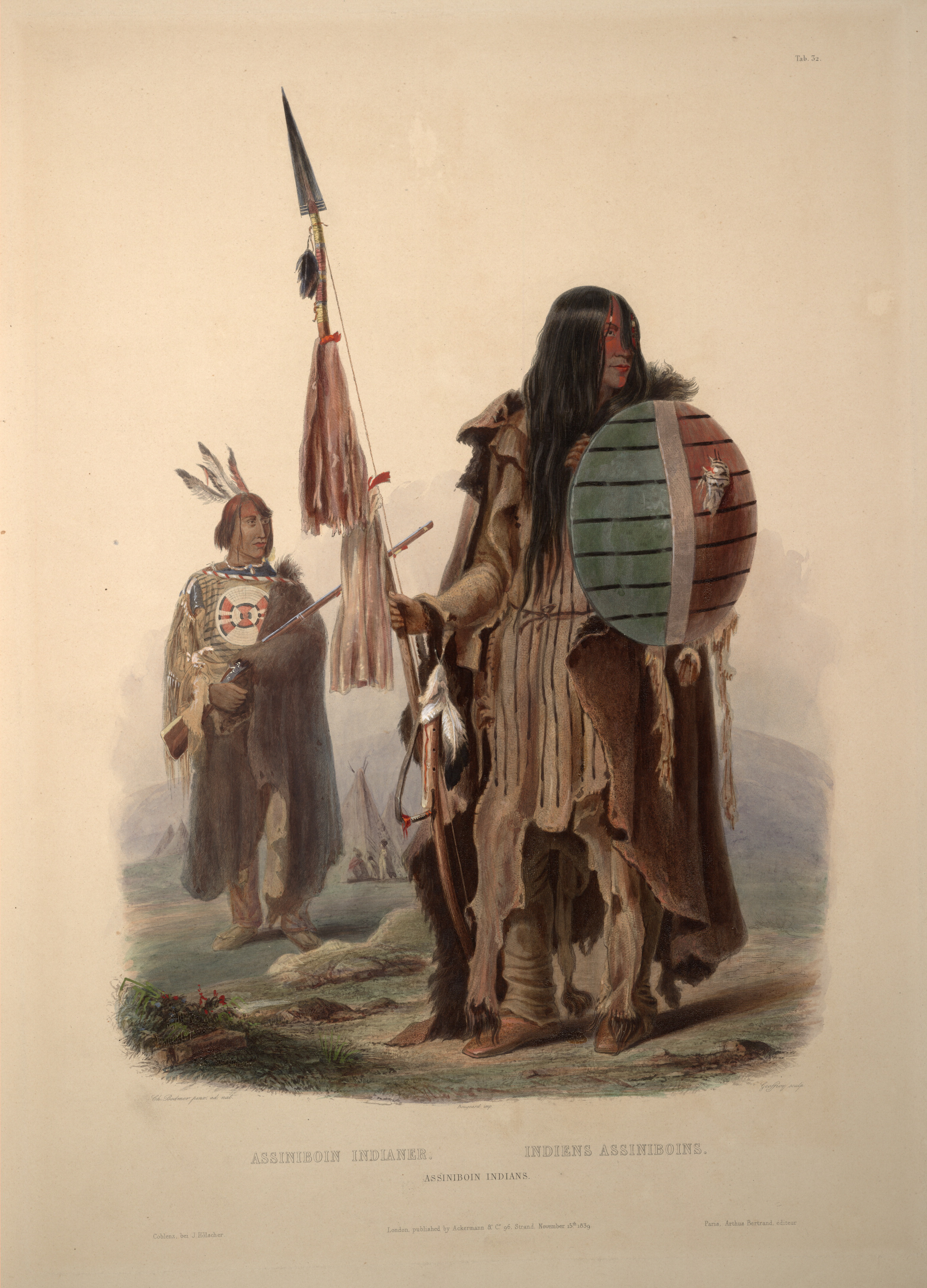
- Two Assiniboine warriors, painted by Karl Bodmer in the 1840s

Total population
- 3,500

Regions with significant populations
- Canada (Manitoba, Saskatchewan and Alberta); United States (North Dakota and Montana)

Languages
- Assiniboine, English

Religion
- Indigenous religion, Sun Dance, Native American Church, Christianity

Related ethnic groups
- Dakota, Nakota (Stoney)

Nakota / Nakoda / Nakona "ally / friend"
- Person: Nakóda
- People: Nakón Oyáde
- Language: Nakón Iyábi; Nakón Wíyutabi
- Country: Nakón Mąkóce

The Assiniboine (/əˈsɪnɪbɔɪn/ ə-SIN-ih-boyn) are an Indigenous people of the Northern Plains. They are one of the First Nations in Canada, where they primarily live in Saskatchewan, with some living in Alberta and southwestern Manitoba, and they are a Native American people in the United States, where they primarily live in northern Montana, with some living in western North Dakota.

In the 18th century, the Assiniboine were part of the Iron Confederacy with the Cree.

== Names ==
The name Assiniboine is also spelled Assiniboin and is pluralized as Assiniboines and Assiniboins /əˈsɪnɪbɔɪnz/. In Ojibwe, their name is Asiniibwaan which translates to "Stone Sioux". They are also known as the Hohe and the endonym Nakoda, also spelled Nakota or Nakona.

The Europeans and Americans adopted names that other tribes used for the Assiniboine; they did not until later learn the tribe's autonym, their name for themselves. In Siouan languages, they are Nakoda. With the widespread adoption of North American English, however, many now use the name that became common in English. The English adopted Assiniboine, used by the Canadian French colonists. It was a transliteration into French phonetics of what they heard the Ojibwe use as a term for these western people. The Ojibwe name is asinii-bwaan (stone Sioux). In Cree they are called asinîpwâta (asinîpwâta ᐊᓯᓃᐹᐧᑕ noun animate singular, asinîpwâtak ᐊᓯᓃᐹᐧᑕᐠ noun animate plural).

In the same way, Assnipwan comes from the word asinîpwâta in the western Cree dialects, from asiniy ᐊᓯᓂᐩ noun animate 'rock, stone' and pwâta ᐹᐧᑕ noun animate 'enemy, Sioux'. Early French-speaking traders in the west were often familiar with Algonquian languages. They wrote (with the French spelling system) many Cree or Ojibwe exonyms for other western Canada indigenous peoples during the early colonial era. English speakers referred to the Assiniboine by adopting terms from French, but pronouncing them according to the English spelling system.

The word Assiniboine has its origin as follows: They split from the Sioux in the 1500s. Their ancient rivals the Ojibwe, knew of these as a new people and they start calling them Asiniy-Pwât meaning "Stone Dakota."

Other tribes associated "stone" with the Assiniboine because they primarily cooked with heated stones. They dropped hot stones into water to heat it to boiling for cooking meat. Some writers believed that the name was derived from the Ojibway term asin, stone, and the French bouillir, to boil, but such an etymology is very unlikely.

== Language ==
Assiniboine is a Mississippi Valley Siouan language, in the Western Siouan language family. As of the early 21st century, about 150 people speak the language and most are more than 40 years old. The majority of the Assiniboine today speak only American English. The 2000 census showed 3,946 tribal citizens who lived in the United States.

Assiniboine are closely linked by language to the Stoney First Nations people of Alberta. The latter two tribes speak varieties of Nakota (Stoney), a distant, and not mutually intelligible, variant of the Sioux language.

== History ==
=== Early history ===
The Assiniboine, along with the Stoney of Alberta, share a common ancestry with the Sioux nation. While it was formerly believed that the Yankon-Yanktonai division of the Dakota Sioux descend from the Assiniboine, linguistic analysis indicates that the Assiniboine and Stoney together form a group coordinate with that of the Santee, Lakota, and Yankton-Yanktonai, and that they are no more related to one of these subdivisions than another. The separation of the Assiniboine from the Sioux must have occurred at some time prior to 1620, as Paul Le Jeune names them along with the "Naduessi" (Sioux) in his Jesuit Relations of that year.

The Assiniboine and Sioux were both gradually pushed westward onto the plains from the woodlands of Minnesota by the Ojibwe, who had acquired firearms from their French allies. Later, the Assiniboine acquired horses via raiding and trading with neighboring tribes of Plains Indians such as the Crow and the Sioux on their south.

The Assiniboine eventually developed into a large and powerful people with a horse and warrior culture; they used the horse to hunt the vast numbers of bison that lived within and outside their territory. At the height of their power, the Assiniboine dominated territory ranging from the North Saskatchewan River in the north to the Missouri River in the south, and including portions of modern-day Saskatchewan, Alberta, and Manitoba, Canada; and North Dakota and Montana, United States.

=== Contact with Europeans and fur trade ===
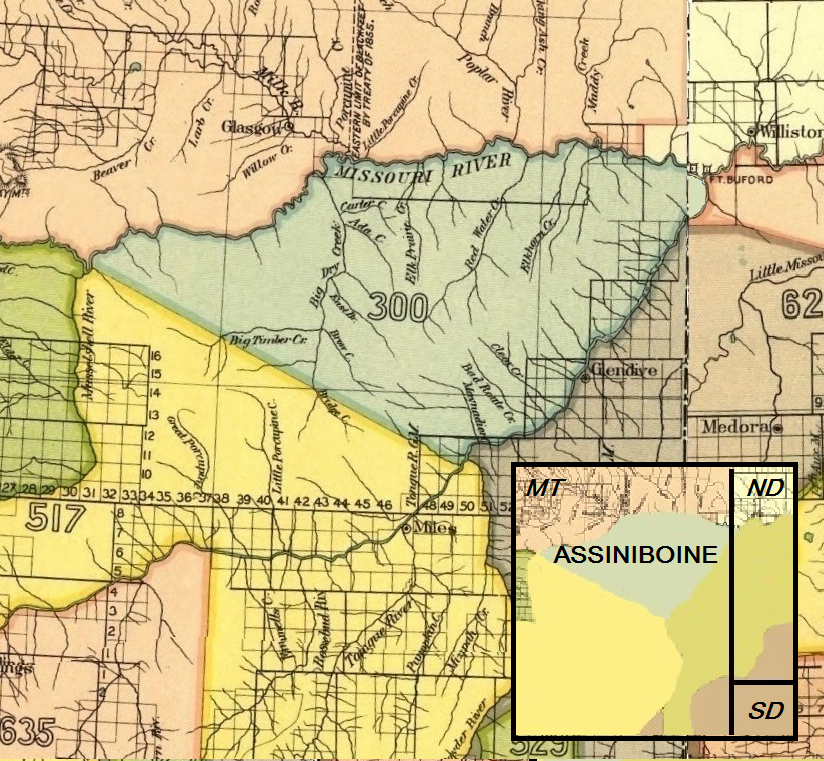
Map showing the Assiniboine Indian territory as described in the Treaty of Fort Laramie (1851), Montana, Areaa 300

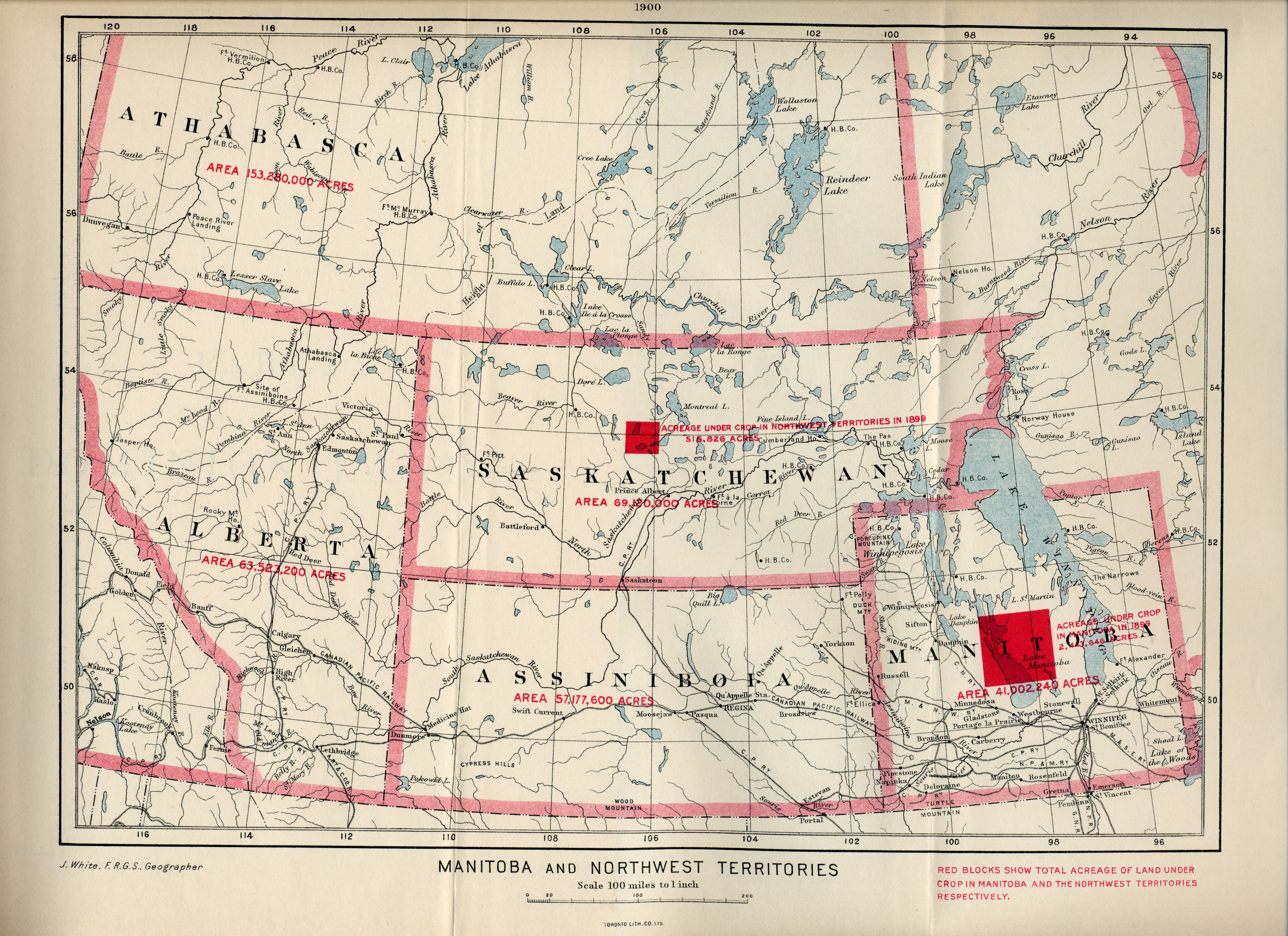
A 1900 map showing the boundaries of the District of Assiniboia in what was then the Northwest Territories

The first person of European descent to describe the Assiniboine was an employee of the Hudson's Bay Company named Henry Kelsey in the 1690s. Later explorers and traders Jean Baptiste de La Vérendrye and his sons (1730s), Anthony Henday (1754–55), and Alexander Henry the younger (1800s) confirmed that the Assiniboine held a vast territory across the northern plains, including into the United States (which achieved independence in 1776 but did not acquire the plains until 1803 in the Louisiana Purchase from France.)

The Assiniboine became crucial to the North American fur trade. They were reliable and important trading partners and middlemen for fur traders and other Indigenous peoples of Northern America, particularly the British Hudson's Bay Company and North West Company, operating in western Canada in a vast area known then as Rupert's Land and the North-Western Territory. During the later 18th century and early 19th century, south of the border in what became the Montana and Dakota territories, the Assiniboine traded with the American Fur Company and the competing Rocky Mountain Fur Company. The Assiniboine obtained guns, ammunition, metal tomahawks, metal pots, wool blankets (Hudson's Bay point blanket), wool coats, wool leggings, and glass beads, as well as other goods from the fur traders in exchange for furs. Beaver furs and bison hides were the most commonly traded furs.

Increased contact with Europeans resulted in Native Americans contracting Eurasian infectious diseases that were endemic among the Europeans. They suffered epidemics with high mortality, most notably smallpox among the Assiniboine. The Assiniboine population crashed from around 10,000 people in the late 18th century to around 2600 by 1890.

The Lewis and Clark Expedition was mounted by the United States in 1804–1806 to explore the Louisiana Territory, newly acquired from France. The expedition's journals mention the Assiniboine, whom the party heard about while returning from Fort Clatsop down the Missouri River. These explorers did not encounter or come in direct contact with the tribe.

Noted European and American painters traveled with traders, explorers, and expeditions for the opportunity to paint the West and its Native American peoples. Among those who encountered and painted the Assiniboine from life were painters Karl Bodmer, Paul Kane, and George Catlin.

The Assiniboine signed the Treaty of Fort Laramie (1851).

In 1885, some Assiniboine scouts aided the Canadian North-West Mounted Police (see North-West Mounted Police during the North-West Rebellion) track down Cree who were participating in the Second Riel Rebellion of Métis, Cree, and Assiniboine.

== Interactions with other tribes ==
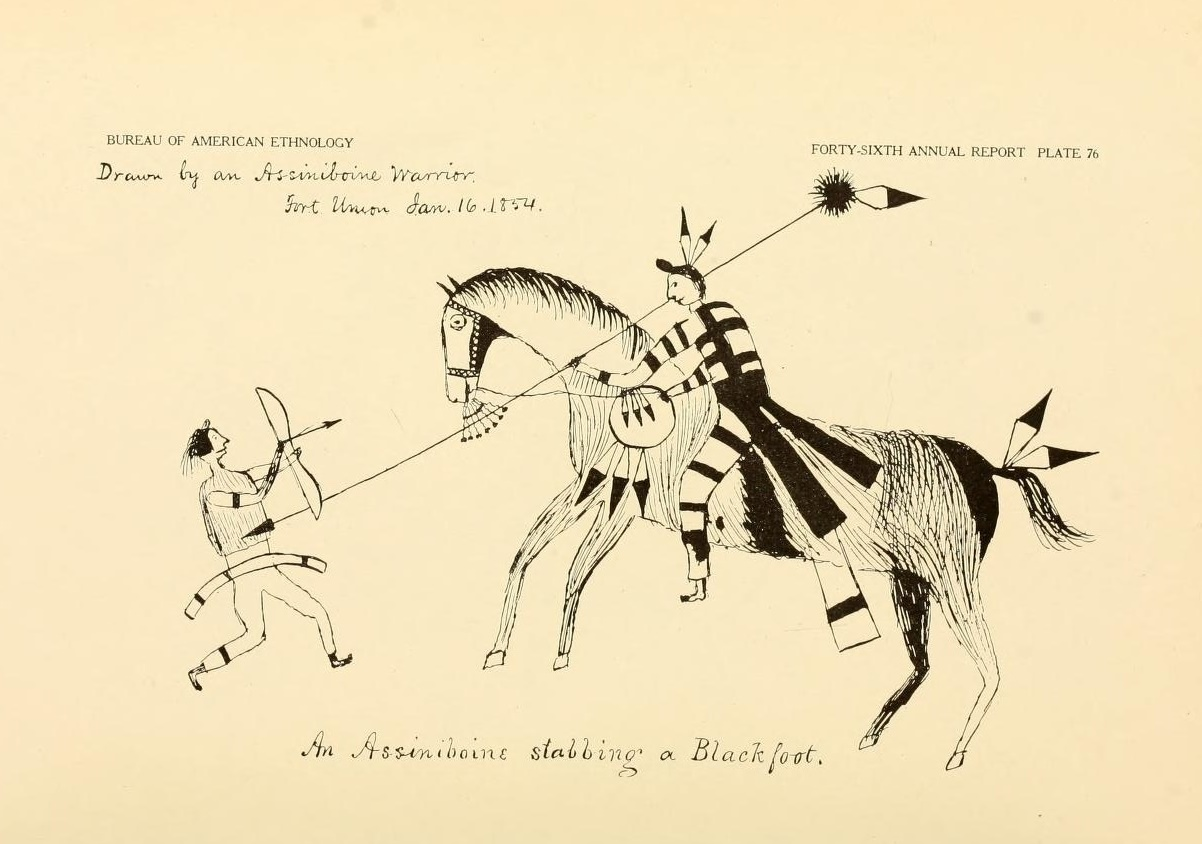
Mounted Assiniboine warrior attacking a Blackfoot. Drawn by an Assiniboine warrior at Fort Union

In Assiniboine (Nakoda) history, "Left Hand" (also "Has the knife") refers to chief Tchatka/Chatga, known to the Euro/Americans as Gauche, after whom Gauches band (a major division called the Watopahnatowan/Canoe paddlers who live on the prairie) was named. At the height of Tchatka's band power and size in the early 19th-century, Tchatkas fine encampment was recorded of comprising 1200-2000 warriors capable of bearing arms, with 7000 souls total. His band alone roamed the open northern plains and prairie regions of the Upper Missouri River watershed, across present day Montana, the Dakota's, and southern Canadian provinces. Due to their aggressive independence, military prowess, and skill as great horse raiders and warriors, Gauches band broke away from their parent band the Wadópabina (Canoe paddlers). Neighboring tribes, rival warriors, and even members of his own band deeply feared Tchatka, rival nations including the Blackfoot Confederacy and Gros-Ventre to the West, along with the Shoshone and Crow to the South, actively feared his war parties. In one notable 1833 attack outside the walls of Fort McKenzie, Tchatka lead a force of roughly 600 warriors against a Blackfoot trading party, wiping out a majority of them and capturing over 300 horses. After Tchatka disarmed, killed, scalped and severed the hands of a Blackfoot chief in a skirmish, he took the name Mina-yougha ("Has the knife").

=== Iron Confederacy ===
The Assiniboine were a major part of an alliance of northern Plains Indian nations known as the Iron Confederacy, or Nēhiyaw-Pwat, as it is known in Plains Cree, beginning prior to 1692 until the late 19th century. The Iron Confederacy were allies in the fur trade, particularly with the Hudson's Bay Company. The Assiniboine and the Cree (šahíya) being important intermediaries in the Great Plains First Nations trading networks. Members included the Assiniboine, Stoney (téhą nakóda or į́yąȟe wįcášta), the Cree and Woodland Cree, Saulteaux (called iʾášijabina), as well as Métis (sakná), and individual Iroquois people who traveled west as employees for the fur traders. Loosely associated for military shelter against the Blackfoot and to ensure safe access to the prairies for the bison hunt were Plateau tribes such as Bitterroot Salish (Flathead) (pámnaska), Kutenai, Sekani, Secwépemc, and Nez Perce (pasú oȟnóga). Other Indian peoples on the northern plains, such as the Gros Ventre (ȟaȟátųwą), were occasionally part of the confederacy.

The confederacy became the dominant force on the northern plains. It posed a major threat to Indian nations not associated with it, such as the Shoshone (snohéna wįcášta) and Crow (kąǧí tóga or tógabi = "enemies") further south. Their most mighty and most dangerous enemy, however, were their former trading partner the Blackfoot Confederacy (sihásaba = Blackfeet or tógabi = "enemies"). The kindred Sioux (įhą́ktuwą) and their allies, the Arapaho (maȟpíyato) and Cheyenne (šahíyena), were also enemies. The Iron Confederacy also attacked European-American settlements on the Plains. The eventual decline of the fur trade and overhunting of the bison herds by Canadian and American hunters, which destroyed the Confederacy nations' most important food source, led to the defeat and breaking up of the confederacy. It engaged in military action with Canada during the North-West Rebellion.

== Traditional lifestyle ==
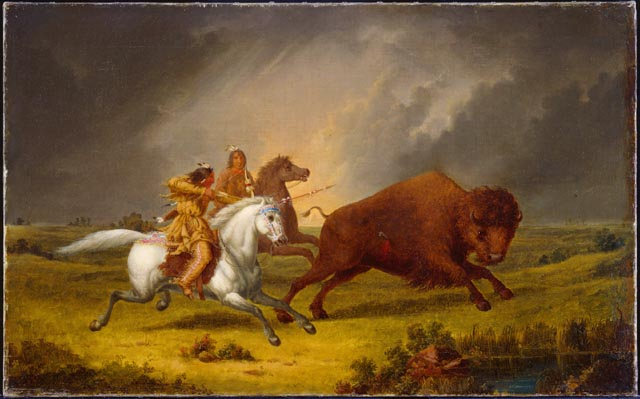
Assiniboine Hunting Buffalo, 1851

Traditionally the Assiniboine were semi-nomadic people. During the warmer months, they followed and hunted the herds of plains bison. Women, as life-givers, have had primary responsibility for the survival and welfare of the families (and future of the tribe). Women usually gathered and cultivated plants, used plants and herbs to treat illnesses, cared for the young and the elderly, made all the clothing and instruments, and processed and cured meat and skins from the game. The women processed and preserved the meat for winter, and used hides, tendons, and horns for clothing, bedding, tools, cord and other items. Every part of the animal was used by the people.

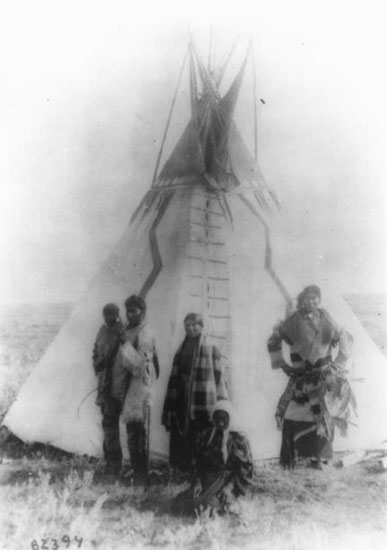
Assiniboine family, Montana, 1890–1891

The men hunted, traded and made war on horseback using bow and arrows. The tribe is known for its excellent horsemanship. They first obtained horses by trading with the Blackfeet and the Gros Ventre tribes. Assiniboine, Stoney (as well as Lakota and Dakota) girls were encouraged to learn to ride, hunt and fight. Though fighting in war has mostly been left to the boys and men, occasionally women have fought as well – both in battles and in defense of the home – especially if the tribe was severely threatened.

They worked with the Mandan, Hidatsa, and Arikara tribes.

The Sun god and Thunder god were considered the most important manifestations of the Great Spirit. The Assiniboine people participated in the Sun Dance like other Plains Native peoples. They also took guidance from personal visions in vision quests.

The Nakoda Oyadebi ("Assiniboine Nation"), was historically divided into up to 40 separate Dagugichiyabi (bands), each of which was led by its own Hųgá / Hunga (tribal chief) and an advisory band council - the so-called Hungabi ("little chiefs"). Other important personalities were the įtą́cą (war chief), who led the warriors in war, and the Wócegiye įtącą (medicine man), who acted both as a religious leader and traditional healer. War deeds, important news, and decisions by the band council were announced by the Hogíyesʼa (camp crier), the Agícida (soldier; camp watcher) acted as "police" and were responsible for maintaining order in the camp, on the hunt, and at wartime.

The individual bands were again divided into several Tiʼóšpaye (local groups), which consisted of one or more extended families. The smallest social unit was the Tiwáhe (nuclear family), which usually lived in one Wiʼį́kceya tíbi / įkcéwąga (tipi) or two neighboring tipis.

As a patrilineal tribe, hereditary leadership passes through the male line, and children are considered to belong to the father and his clan.

== Mythology ==
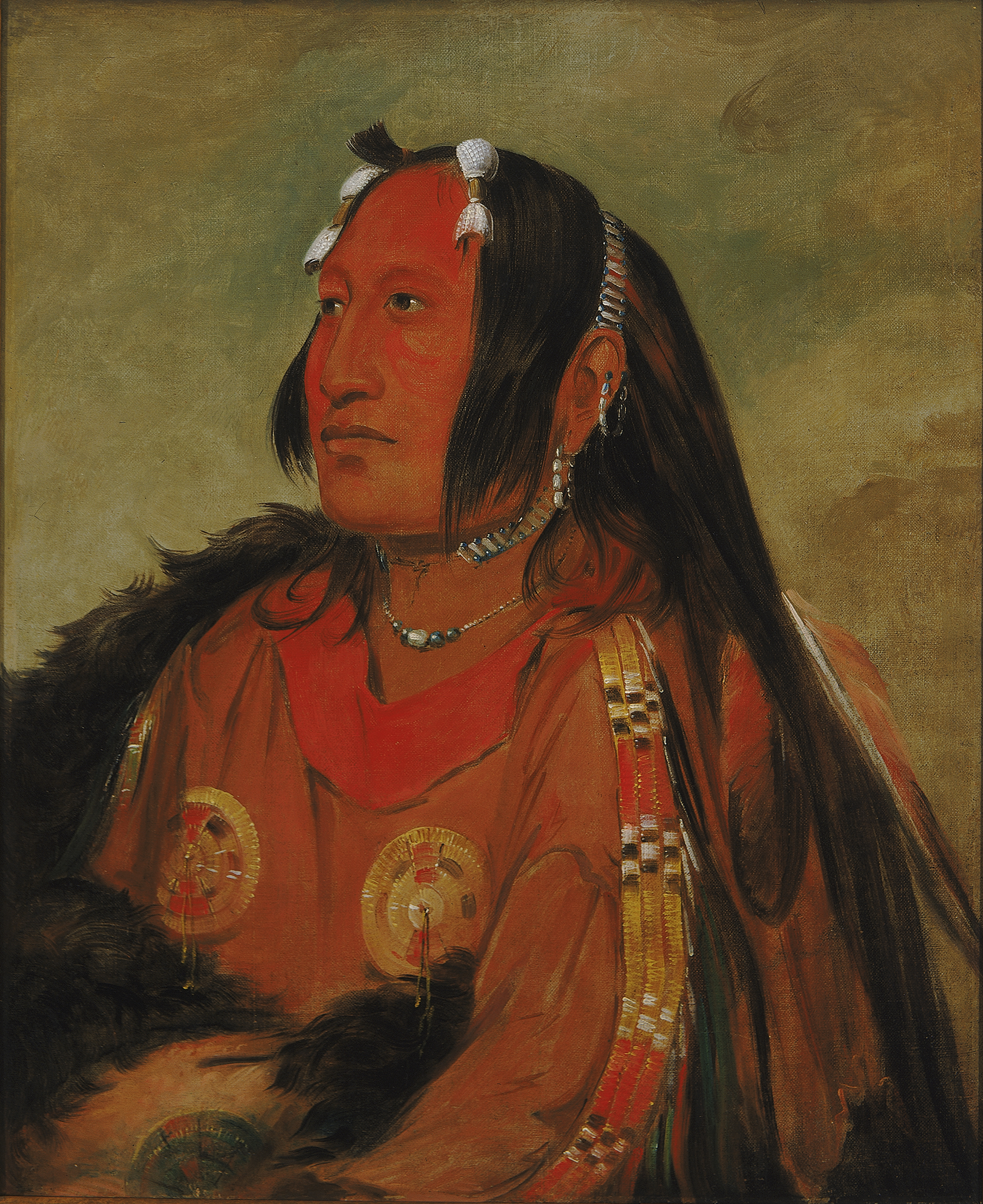
Wi-jún-jon (Pigeon's Egg Head), painted by George Catlin

The figure of Iktome from the Assiniboine creation myth is one of the most famous creator-trickster characters of Native American mythology. In the myth Ikotme sends some animals searching to find land beneath the depths of the primeval sea. This is an "earth-diver" style of creation myth resembling similar stories of the Anishinaabe and Ojibwe peoples. The only animal who succeeds is the muskrat who floats to the surface dead. Ikotme uses the earth the muskrat was clutching in his dead hands to create land. Unlike other creators, Ikotme is amoral. Ikotme kills a frog who challenges his plans to create an endless winter but eventually yields and shortens the length to seven months. He creates horses and humans out of dirt and teaches the Assinibone how to steal horses. Some of the elements in modern versions of the myth include elements that are later additions such as the presence of horses which were introduced to North America by the Spanish.

== Subgroups and bands ==
Red Dog, Assiniboine

Assiniboine woman.

- Aegitina ('Camp Moves to the Kill')
- Bizebina, Bízebina ('Gophers' or 'Gopher People')
- Cepahubi ('Large Organs')
- Canhdada, Cantidada, Cąȟtáda ('Moldy People', lived along the North Saskatchewan River around Battleford (Ogíciza Wakpá) and North Battleford – known as "The Battlefords" – as neighbors of the Waziyamwincasta Band, this territory was contested ground and the area between the North Saskatchewan River and Battle River (the name derives from the war fought between the Iron Confederacy and the Blackfoot Confederacy) was the limit of the warring tribal alliances; political once part of the Upstream People of Plains Cree – today known as Battleford Stoneys part of the Mosquito, Grizzly Bear's Head, Lean Man First Nations)
- Canhewincasta, Cą́ȟe wįcášta, Chan He Winchasta ('Wooded-Mountain People' or 'Wood Mountain People' – 'People Who live around Wood Mountain', lived around today's Wood Mountain and in the adjoining Big Muddy Badlands to the southeast in southern Saskatchewan and northern Montana; close allies to the Insaombi (Cypress Hills Assiniboine) band, in which territory they had their winter camps. They were once politically part of the "Downstream People" of Plains Cree and close allies of the Cree-Assiniboine / Young Dogs; today they are part of the Carry the Kettle Nakoda Nation.

The bands of chief Manitupotis (also known as Wankanto – Little Soldier) and Hunkajuka (Hum-ja-jin-sin, Inihan Kinyen – Little Chief), together about 300 people with about 50 warriors, on June 1, 1873, were victims of the Cypress Hills Massacre. At least 20 Assiniboine were killed by American wolfers to take revenge for horse-stealing Cree in Montana. This massacre led to the development of the North-West Mounted Police (NWMP), later known as the Royal Canadian Mounted Police (RCMP).

- Canknuhabi ('Ones That Carry Their Wood'), Cątų́wąbi ('Forest Villagers, Wood Villagers')
- Cantonga, Chan Tonga Nakoda, also Swampy Ground Assiniboine, Grand River Assiniboine (called by their Cree allies Saka Pwat-sak (Assiniboines of the woods), traded together with the allied and kin Beaver Hills Cree at a trading post operated by the Hudson's Bay Company called Fort Edmonton (former: Edmonton House or Fort-des-Prairies) at the North Saskatchewan River in central Alberta, and after displacing the rival and enemy Tsuutʼina Nation (Sarcee) they took over, together with their Cree allies, the buffalo hunting grounds around Beaverhill Lake (Cree: amisk-wa-chi-sakhahigan; Assiniboine: Chaba Imne, both: "Beaver Lake") and in the Beaver Hills (Cree: Amiskwaciy, Assiniboine: Chaba He(i), both: "Beaver Hills"), they developed since mid 18th century a separate identity as Wood Stoney-Nakoda; They were once politically as Nakoda part of the Beaver Hills Cree of the "Upstream People" of Plains Cree and close allies of the Cree-Assiniboine / Young Dogs; today part of the Alexis Nakota Sioux First Nation and Paul Band.
- Hudesabina, Húdešana, Hudesanak ('Red Bottom' or 'Red Root', split off from the Wadopabina Band in 1844, lived between the Porcupine Creek and Milk River (Asą́bi wakpá, Wakpá jukʾána) area in northern Montana and southern Alberta, Canada. Today they are an Assiniboine / Nakoda band of the federally recognized Fort Peck Assiniboine & Sioux Tribes.
- Hebina, Ye Xa Yabine ('Rock Mountain People', often called Strong Wood Assiniboine or Thickwood Assiniboine, separated from the main body of the Assiniboine in the mid-18th century and moved further west and northwest deep into the forests and Rocky Mountains (In-yan-he-Tonga, į́yąȟetąga – ′great mountains′) to escape smallpox. Because they stayed isolated, they developed a separate identity as Mountain Stoney-Nakoda. Today they are part of the Stoney Nakoda First Nation (Wesley First Nation, Chiniki First Nation, Bearspaw First Nation); some also reside together with other Assiniboine / Nakoda bands in the federally recognized Fort Belknap Indian Community. Some are part of the Aseniwuche Winewak Nation from Canada, which is not recognized by the government as a band.
- Hen atonwaabina ('Little Rock Mountain People', lived in the Little Rocky Mountains (or Little Rockies, į́yąȟe widána, į́yąȟewida; today: į́yąȟejusina) and the adjoining Plains in the northeast of Montana; once political part of the Downstream People of Plains Cree and close allies of the Cree-Assiniboine / Young Dogs – today part of the Fort Belknap Indian Community)
- Huhumasmibi, Huhumasmlbi ('Bone Cleaners')
- Huhuganebabi ('Bone Chippers')
- Indogahwincasta ('East People')
- Inninaonbi, Ini'na u'mbi ('Quiet People')
- Insaombi, įšná ųbísʾa, Icna'umbisa ('The Ones Who Stay Alone', lived in Cypress Hills and adjoining Plains in southern Saskatchewan, Canada; they were also known as the Cypress Hills Assiniboine. They were close allies of the Canhewincasta band, which often wintered in the Cypress Hills. Today they are part of Carry the Kettle Nakoda Nation.
- Inyantonwanbina, Iyethkabi, Îyârhe Nakodabi, such as Mountain Village Band ('Stone / Rock People', 'Mountain People.' At the end of the 18th century, they had retreated deep into the Rocky Mountains (In-yan-he-Tonga, į́yąȟetąga – ′great mountains′) and developed a separate identity as Nakoda (į́yąȟe wįcášta). Today they are one Assiniboine / Nakoda band of the federally recognized Fort Peck Assiniboine & Sioux Tribes.
- Minisose Swnkeebi, Miníšoše Sunkcebi ('Missouri River Dog Band', lived between the Milk River and the Poplar River toward the Missouri River (Miníšoše) in the border region of Montana, Alberta and Saskatchewan. Today they are one Assiniboine / Nakoda band of the federally recognized Fort Peck Assiniboine & Sioux Tribes.
- Minisatonwanbi, Miníšatonwanbi ('Red Water People'), lived along the Red River of the North in the vicinity of today's Winnipeg toward the south banks of Lake Winnipeg and Lake Manitoba in southern Manitoba
- Osnibi, Osníbina ('People of the Cold', one band of Woodland Assiniboine from the north, where the weather is cold.
- Ptegabina, Psamnéwi, PwSymAWock ('Swamp People')
- Sahiyaiyeskabi, šahíya iyéskabina ('Plains Cree-speakers', also known as Cree-Assiniboine / Young Dogs, built up from a number of bands of Plains Cree and Assiniboine. They were later joined by Plains Ojibwe (Saulteaux). They had in common living and traveling in ethnically mixed bands and camps; they had switched to speaking Plains Cree instead of their former mother tongue. They were politically part of the Cree-Assiniboine / Young Dogs, part of the Downstream Peopl' of Plains Cree. Today they are part of Little Black Bear First Nation, Piapot First Nation in Canada, and of the federally recognized Landless Cree of the Fort Peck Assiniboine & Sioux Tribes and Landless Cree and Rocky Boy Cree of the Fort Belknap Indian Community in the United States. They identify today as Cree.
- Sihabi, Sihábi ("Foot People", also known as Foot Assiniboine, developed a separate identity as Wood Stoney-Nakoda, some as Mountain Stoney-Nakoda; as Wood Stoney-Nakoda, they were once politically part of the Beaver Hills Cree of the Upstream People of Plains Cree. Today, they are the Alexis Nakota Sioux First Nation and Paul First Nation. As Mountain Stoney-Nakoda, they were part of the Rocky Mountain Cree. Today, this is Wesley First Nation under Stoney Nakoda First Nation.
- Snugabi ('Contrary People')
- Sunkcebi, šųkcébina ('Dog Band', 'Dog Penis Band'; Cree-name: Atimotakayuk - 'Dog Penis Assiniboine', so called because of their ardor for women; once political part of the Calling River / Qu'Appelle Cree of Plains Cree. Today they are part of White Bear First Nations; some are part of Carry the Kettle Nakoda Nation)
- Tanidabi, Tanį́debina, Tanin'tabin ('Buffalo Hip')
- Tokanbi, Toką́kna, Tokaribi ('Strangers')
- Tanzinapebina, Taminapebina ('Owners of Sharp Knives')
- Unskaha ('Roamers')
- Wadopabina, Wadópana (Canoe Paddlers'), the Cree called them Pimiskau Wi Iniwak – 'paddling Assiniboines', therefore in English often called Canoe Assiniboine, Paddling Assiniboine. Today one Assiniboine / Nakoda band of the Fort Peck Assiniboine & Sioux Tribes)
- Wadopahnatonwan, Wadópaȟna Tųwą, Wado Pahanda Tonwan (Canoe Paddlers Who Live on the Prairie', split from the Wadopabina band to roam the plains, the European traders called them Watopachnato – Big Devils, because they were known as cunning traders and great warriors and horse thieves; later also known as Gauche's Band after an important and great chief Tchatka/Caht ka ("Left Hand", "He who holds the knife") who went by the whites by the same name Gauche; today one Assiniboine / Nakoda band of the Fort Peck Assiniboine & Sioux Tribes and Fort Belknap Indian Community)
- Waką́hežabina, in English often called Little Girls Band and by the French as Gens des Feuilles; today one Assiniboine / Nakoda band of the Fort Peck Assiniboine & Sioux Tribes)
- Wasinazinyabi, Waci'azi hyabin ('Fat Smokers')
- Waziyamwincasta, Wazíyam Wįcášta, Waziya Winchasta, Wiyóhąbąm Nakóda ('People of the North'; once politically part of the Parklands Cree of the Upstream People of Plains Cree – today living on Indian reserve Mosquito 109, and known as Battleford Stoneys, they are part of the Mosquito, Grizzly Bear's Head, Lean Man First Nations, some of them moved about 1839 into the United States and are today part of Nakoda / Assiniboine bands of the Fort Belknap Indian Community)
- Wiciyabina, Wichiyabina ('Ones That Go to the Dance', therefore often called for short Wįcį́jana – Girl Band; political once part of the Calling River / Qu'Appelle Cree of the Downstream People of Plains Cree – today one Assiniboine / Nakoda band of the Fort Peck Assiniboine & Sioux Tribes)
- Wokpanbi, Wókpąnbi ('Meat Bag')

== Current Assiniboine nations ==
Today, a substantial number of Assiniboine people live jointly with other tribes, such as the Plains Cree, Saulteaux, Lakota, Dakota, and A'aninin, living in several reserves and reservations in Canada and the United States. In Manitoba, the Assiniboine survive as individuals and hold no separate communal reserves.

=== Montana ===
- Assiniboine and Sioux Tribes of the Fort Peck Indian Reservation (about 11,786 Hudesabina, Wadopabina, Wadopahnatonwan, Sahiyaiyeskabi, Inyantonwanbina and Fat Horse Band of the Assiniboine, Sisseton, Wahpeton, Yanktonai and Hunkpapa of the Sioux live together on the Fort Peck Indian Reservation near Fort Peck in northeastern Montana north of the Missouri River, ca. 8,518 km^{2} (3,289 sq mi), Tribal headquarters are in Poplar, largest community on the reservation is the city of Wolf Point)
- Fort Belknap Indian Community of the Fort Belknap Reservation of Montana (of about 5,426 enrolled Assiniboine and Gros Ventre). The majority of the people live on the Fort Belknap Indian Reservation; some 505 live elsewhere. It is in north central Montana, and largest city is Fort Belknap Agency, ca. 2,626 km^{2} (1,014 sq mi))

In March 2012, these two reservations has received 63 American bison from Yellowstone National Park, to be released to a 850 ha (2,100 acres) game preserve 40 km (25 mi) north of Poplar. There are many other bison herds outside Yellowstone; this is one of the few genetically pure ones in which the animals were not cross-bred with cattle. Native Americans celebrated this action for restoration of the bison. It came more than a century after the bison were nearly destroyed by overhunting by European Americans and government action to destroy the food source of the powerful Plains Indians. The Assiniboine and Gros Ventre tribes at the Fort Belknap Indian Reservation will also receive a portion of this herd.

=== Saskatchewan, Canada ===
- Carry the Kettle Nakoda Nation (Assiniboine: Céǧa kʾína oyáde) (the reserve Carry the Kettle Nakoda First Nation No. 76 (not to be confused with Carry the Kettle 76-1), also known as: 'Assiniboine 76', or Carry the Kettle #76-18, 19, 22, in southeast Saskatchewan, 80 km (50 mi) east of Regina and 18 km (11 mi) south of Sintaluta, of 2,387 registered Assiniboine only about 850 live on the reserve)
- Mosquito, Grizzly Bear's Head, Lean Man First Nations (Assiniboine: Capų́ga-Matópa-Hústaga oyáde) (also known as Battleford Stoneys) (includes the following reserves: Mosquito 109, Gold Eagle Reserve, Grizzly Bear's Head 110 & Lean Man 111, Mosquito, Grizzly Bear's Head, Lean Man TLE 1, tribal headquarters and administration are 27 km (17 mi) south of Battleford, ca. 127 km^{2} (49 sq mi), in 2003 there were about 1,119 registered Assiniboine)
- White Bear First Nations (Assiniboine: Matóska oyáde)(reserves: White Bear 70 and Treaty Four Reserve Grounds 77 are in the southeast corner of the Moose Mountain area of Saskatchewan, tribal headquarters are located 13 km (8.1 mi) north of Carlyle, ca. 172 km^{2} (66 sq mi), about 1,990 Assiniboine, Saulteaux (Anishinaabe), Cree and Dakota)
- Ocean Man First Nation (16 reserves including: Ocean Man 69, 69A-I, Treaty Four Reserve Grounds 77, tribal headquarters are located 19 km (12 mi) north of Stoughton, ca. 41 km^{2} (16 sq mi), of 454 registered Assiniboine, Cree and Saulteaux (Anishinaabe) only 170 are living on reserve grounds)
- Pheasant Rump Nakota First Nation (Assiniboine: Šiyónidè oyáde) (reserved: Pheasant Rump 68, Treaty Four Reserve Grounds 77, tribal headquarters are in Kisbey, about 333 Assiniboine, Saulteaux (Anishinaabe) and Cree)

=== Namesakes ===
Canada Steamship Lines named one of their new ships the CSL Assiniboine.

HMCS Assiniboine was the name given to two ships of the Royal Canadian Navy. The first was a destroyer that saw service during the Second World War, and the second was a destroyer during the Cold War era.

"Fort Assiniboine" was a name given to two trading posts; Brandon House, opened in 1793 in Manitoba, and Fort Assiniboine in 1824 in Alberta.

The Assiniboine River, which forms part of the Hudson Bay drainage basin, drains much of Saskatchewan and Manitoba into the Red River of the North, which, in turn, flows into the Hudson Bay via Lake Winnipeg and the Nelson River.

Assiniboia refers to two historical districts of Canada's Northwest Territories. The name is taken from the Assiniboine First Nation.

== Gallery ==
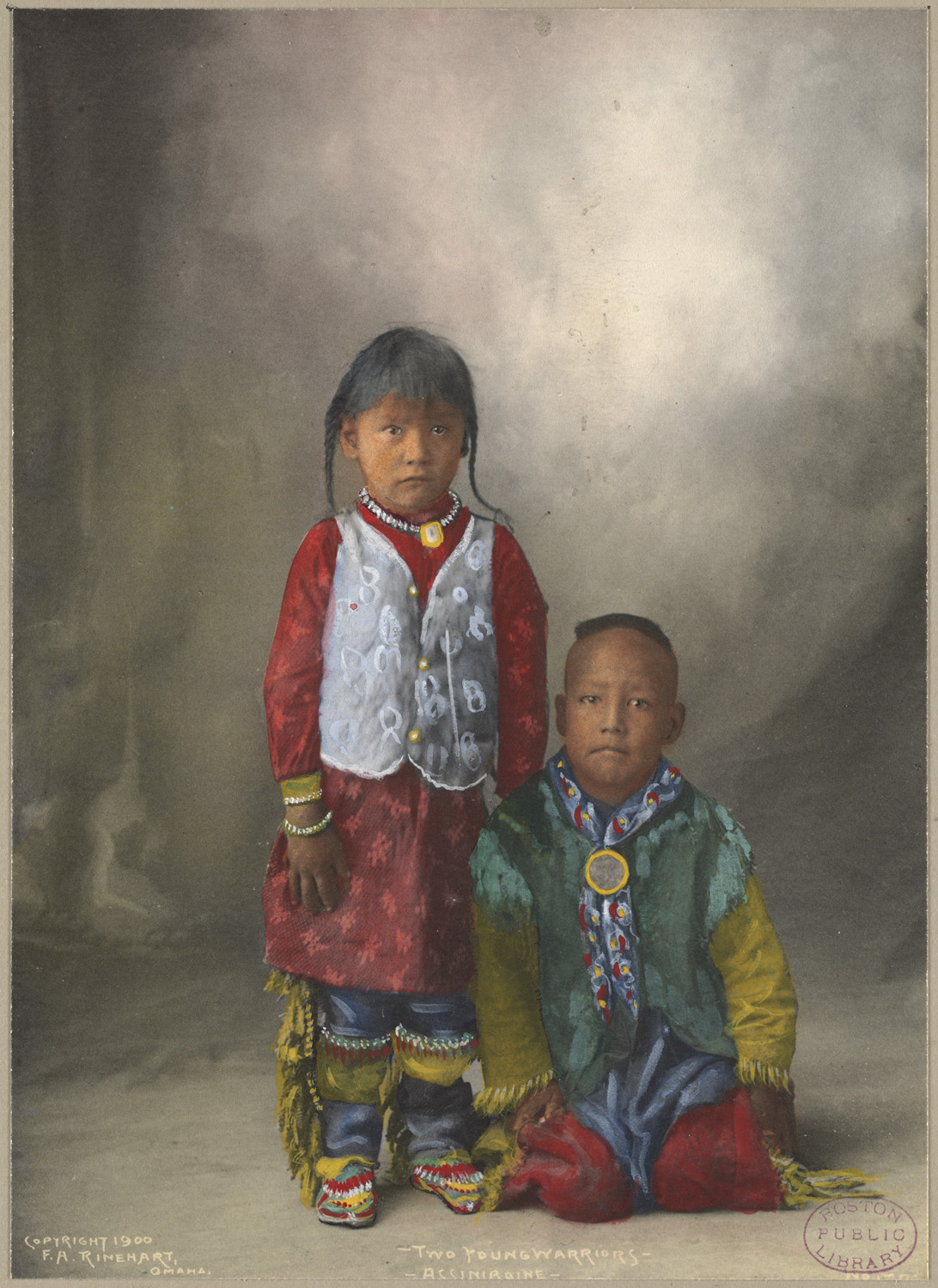
Two young Assiniboine boys

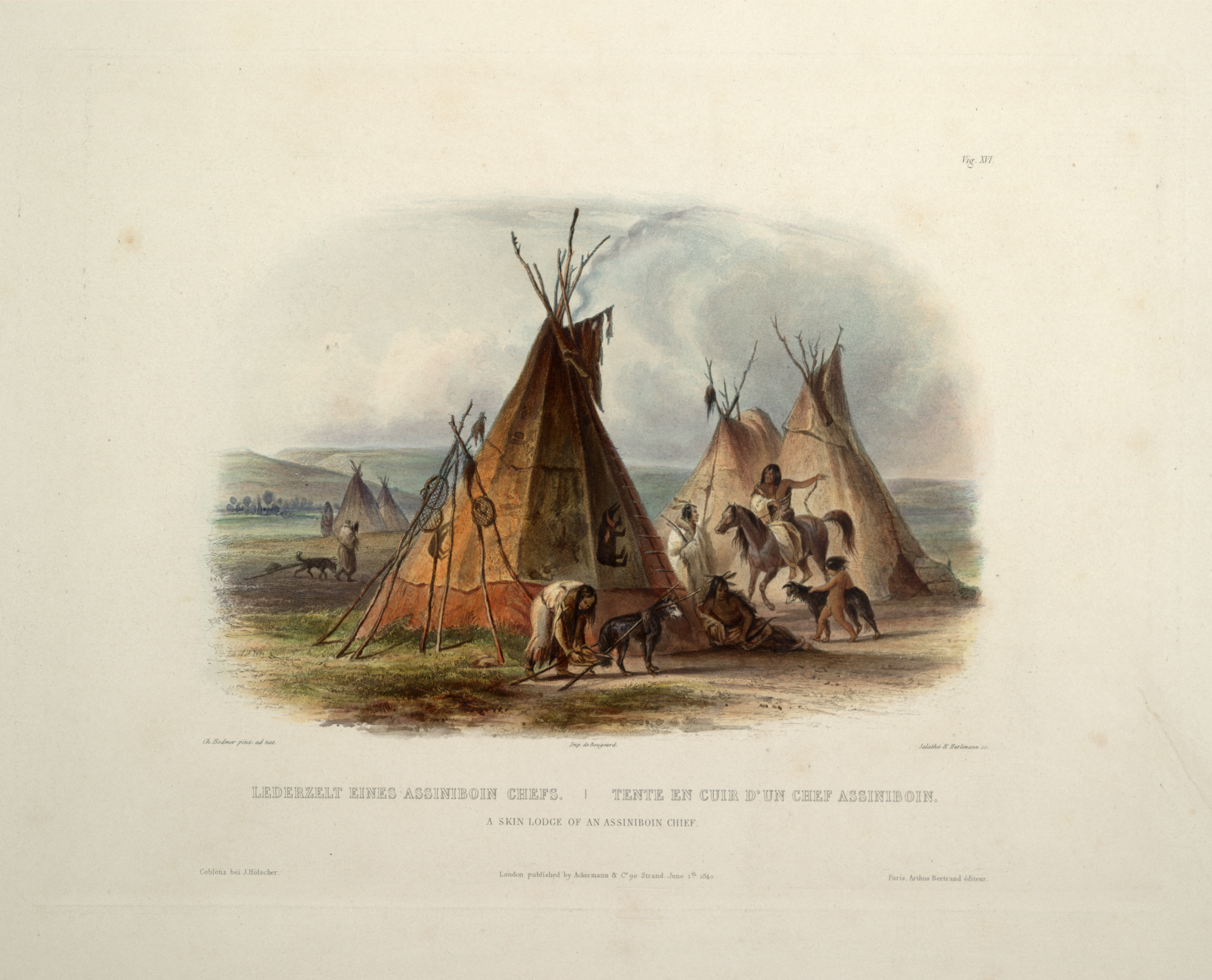
A skin lodge of an Assiniboine chief

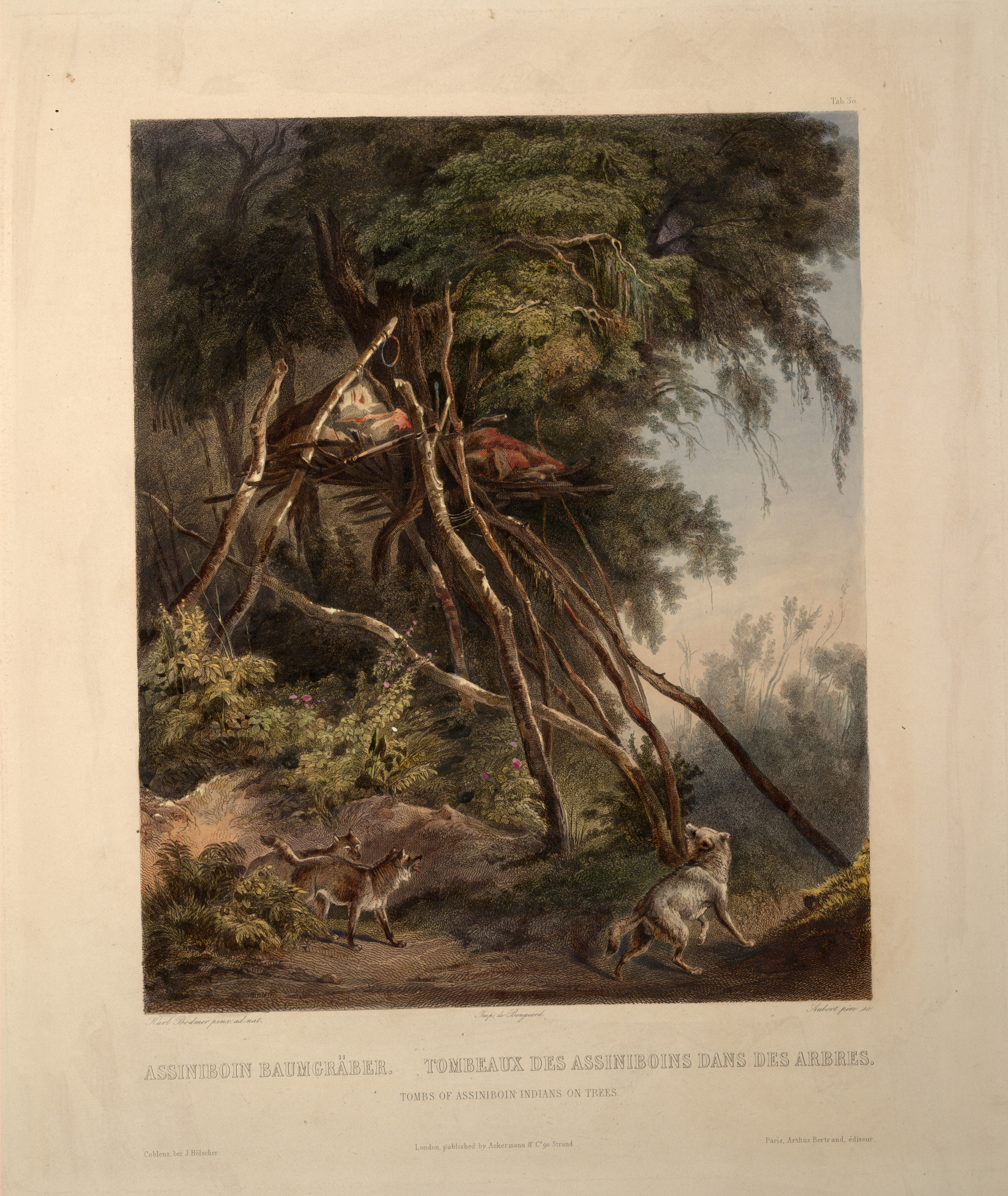
Tomb platforms of Assiniboine in trees

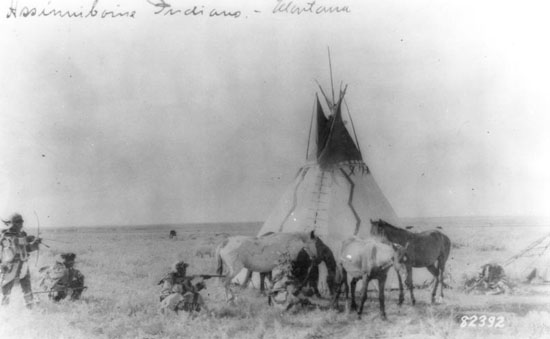
Assiniboine in Montana, 1890–1891

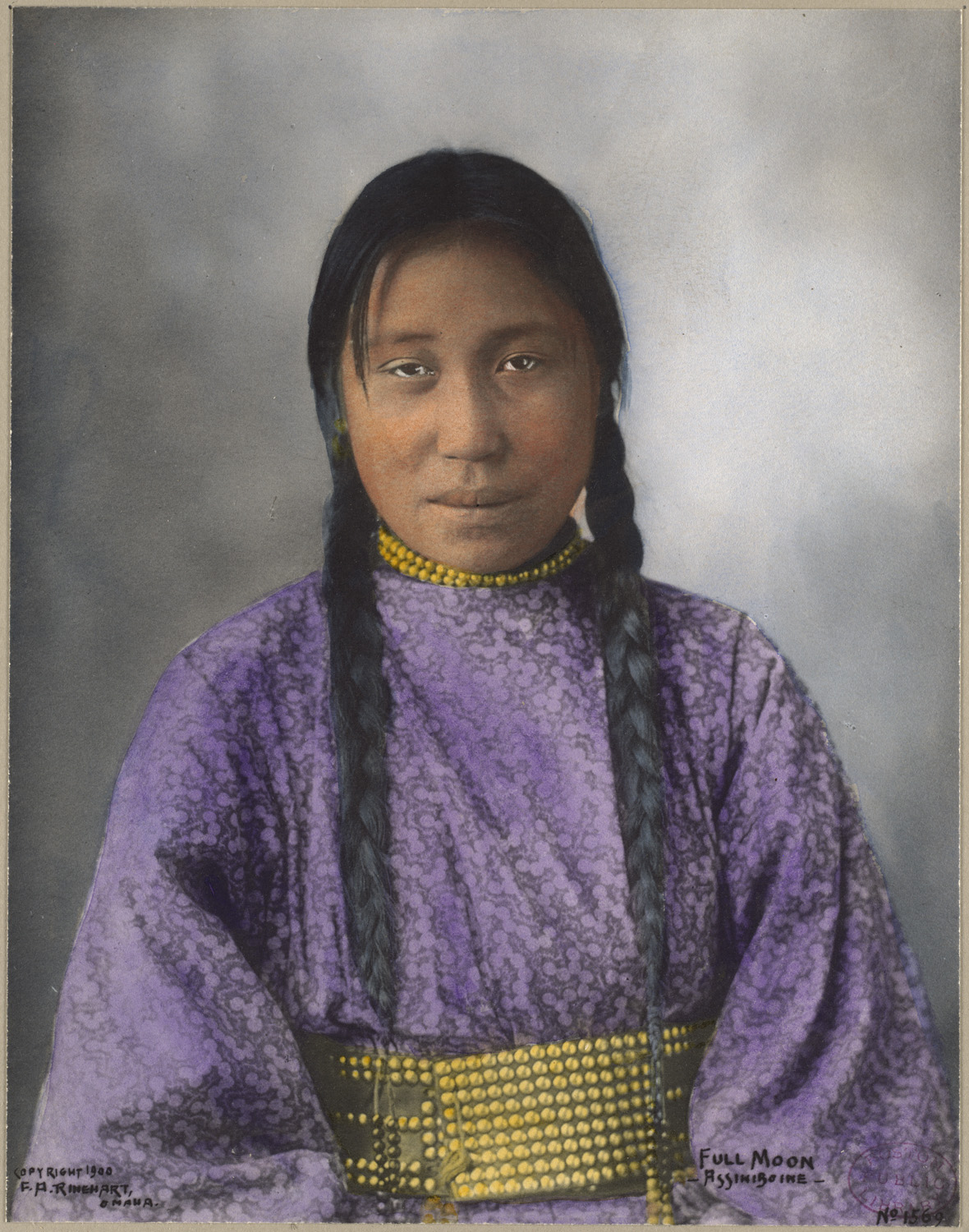
Full Moon (Sophie Hamilton), an Assiniboine woman, 1898

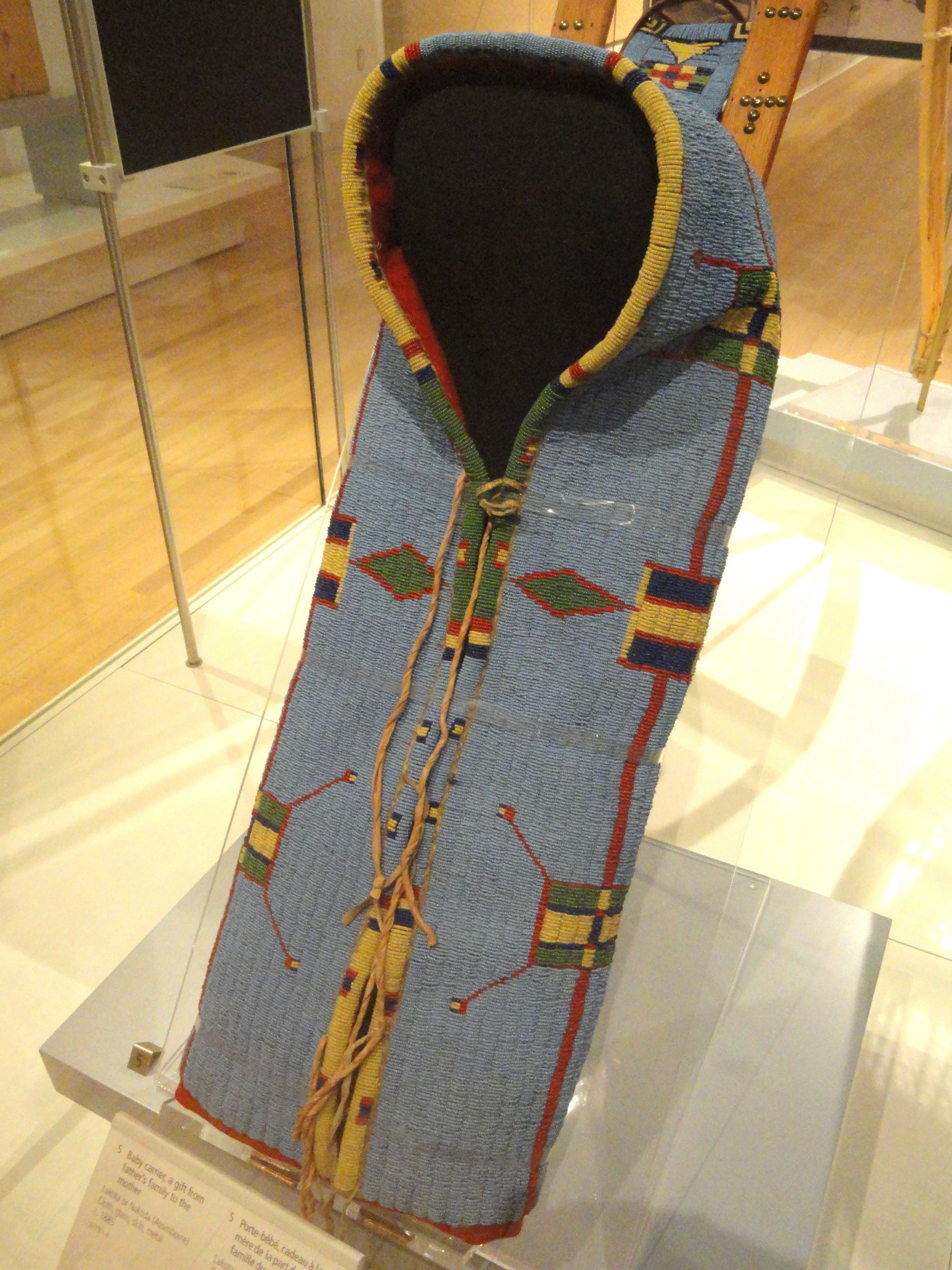
Assiniboine baby carrier

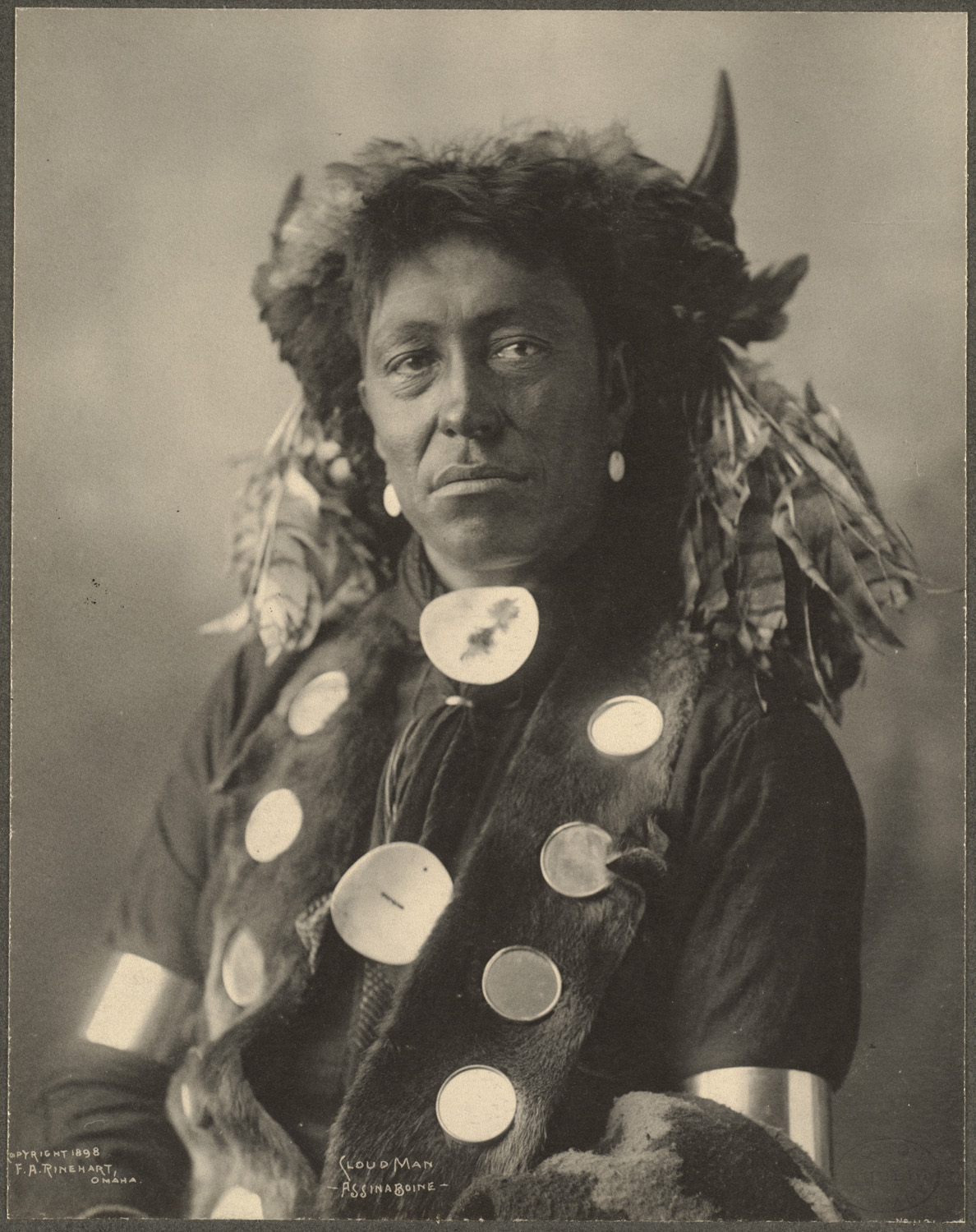
An Assiniboine man named Cloud Man

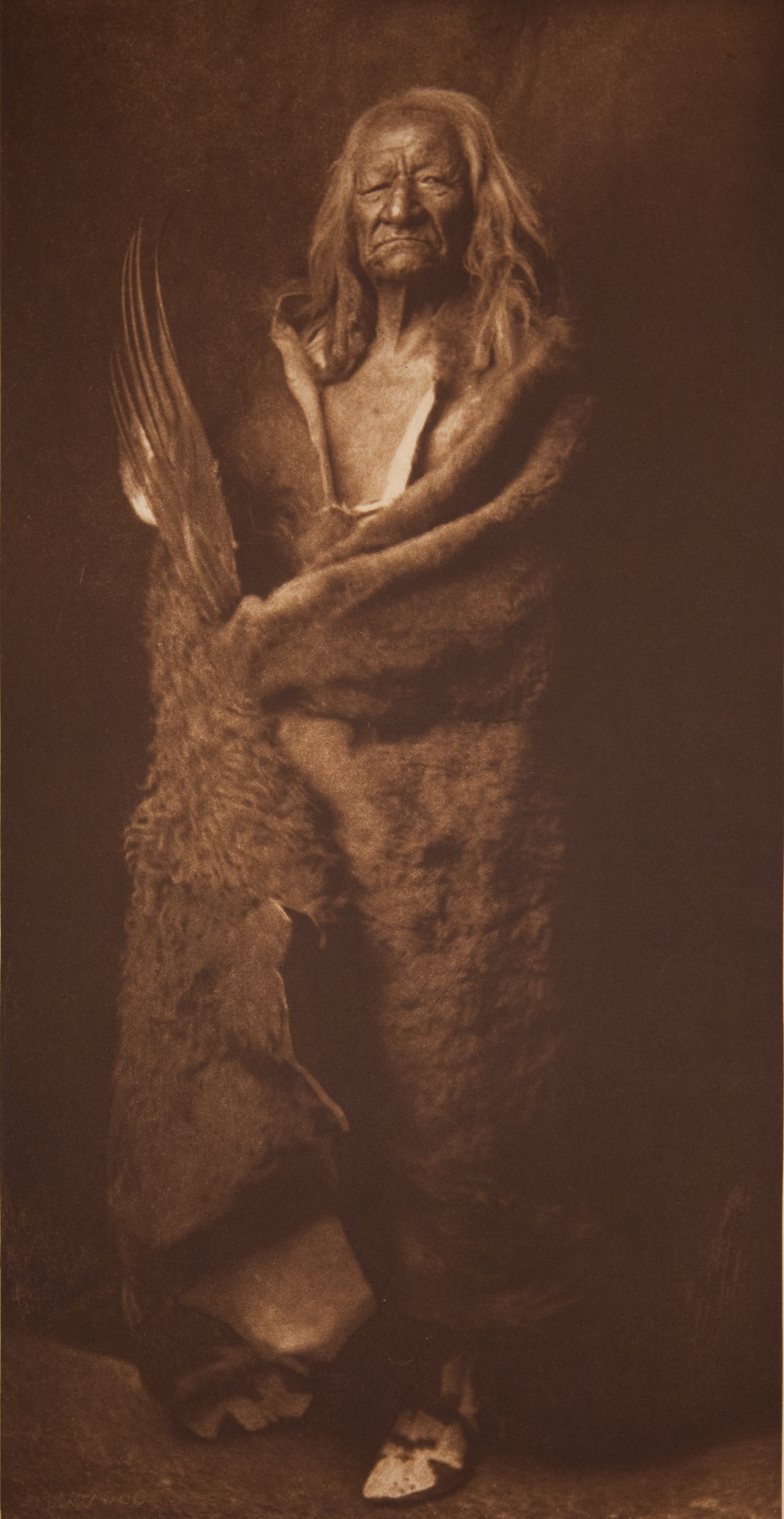
Black Eagle, Assiniboine man, 1908 photo by Edward Curtis

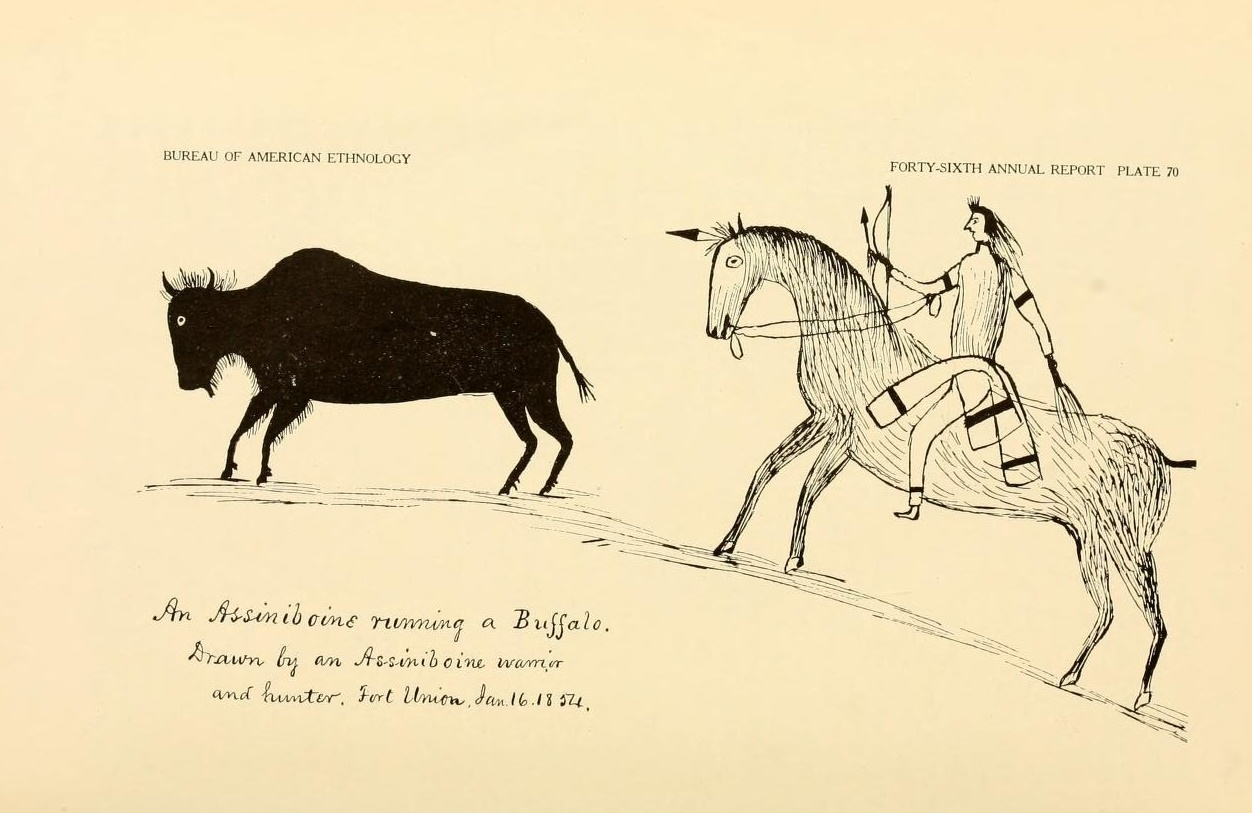
Hunting. Made by an Assiniboine.

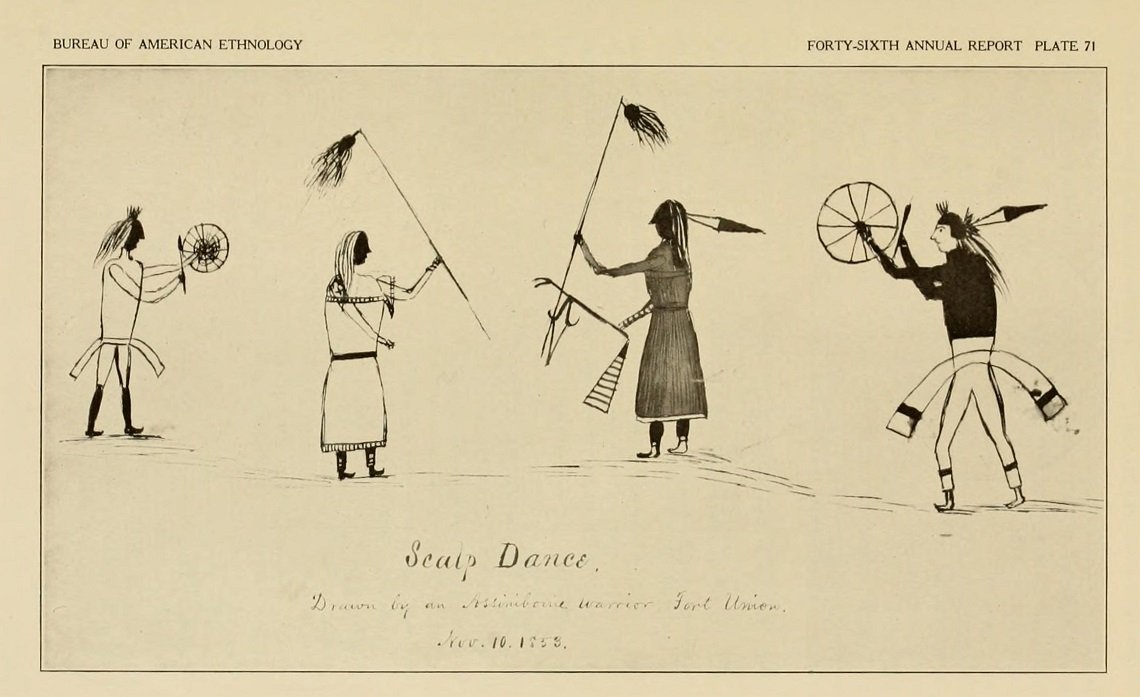
Victory dance of the Assiniboine. Made by an Assiniboine at Fort Union

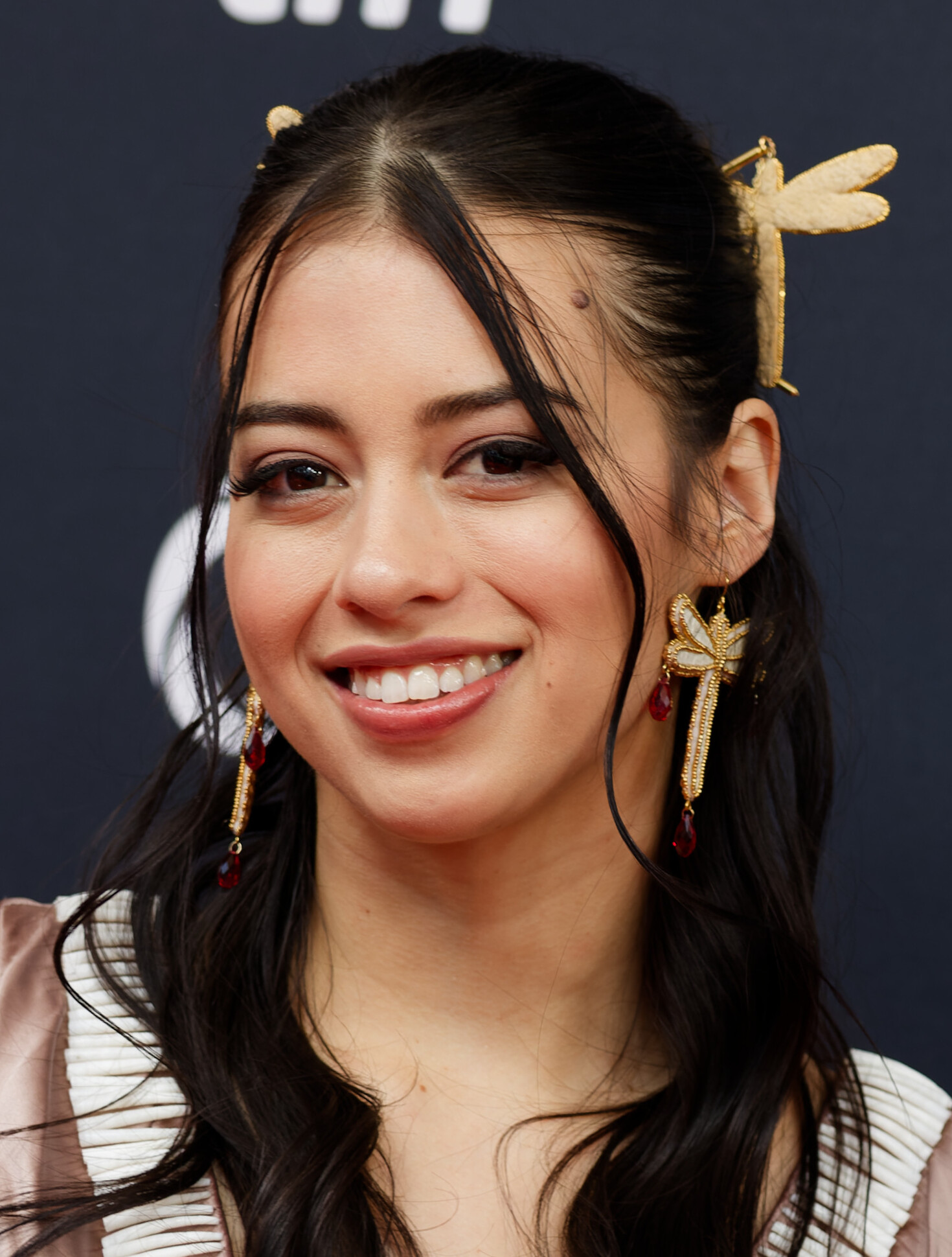
Amber Midthunder, American actress from the Fort Peck Indian Reservation

== Assiniboine people ==
- Hank Adams (1943–2020), indigenous rights activist
- Dolly Akers, Montana legislator
- Minerva Allen (1934–2024), poet and educator
- Lauren Chief Elk (born 1987), feminist educator and writer
- Crazy Bear (Mah-To-Wit-Ko), (1785–1856), chief and negotiator
- Jamie Fox, Métis fiddle
- Juanita Growing Thunder Fogarty (b. 1969), bead artist, quillworker, and regalia maker
- Indigenous, Nakota blues band
- Georgia Wettlin-Larsen, singer
- Amber Midthunder, actress
- Wi-jún-jon (1796–1872), chief
- William S. Yellow Robe Jr. (1960–2021), playwright, author, poet
