= William Standing =

Native American painter

- Born: Fire Bear; July 27, 1904; Fort Peck Indian Reservation, near Oswego, Montana, U.S.
- Died: June 27, 1951 (aged 46); Phillips County, Montana, U.S.
- Citizenship: Assiniboine and Sioux Tribes of the Fort Peck Indian Reservation, United States
- Education: University of Oklahoma; Haskell Institute
- Occupations: Painter, illustrator
- Spouse: Nancy Standing
- Children: 1
- Relatives: Wi-jún-jon (great-grandfather)

William Standing, also known as Fire Bear (July 27, 1904 – June 27, 1951) was an American painter and illustrator. He was Assiniboine, and his work depicted the lives of Native Americans in the Northwestern United States.

== Early life ==
Standing was born on July 27, 1904, on the Fort Peck Indian Reservation near Oswego, Montana. He was Assiniboine; his great-grandfather, Wi-jún-jon, was the chief of the Assiniboine tribe. His Assiniboine name, Fire Bear, was the same as his grandfather's.

Standing was educated on the Fort Peck Indian Reservation until he went to a boarding school run by Presbyterian missionaries in Wolf Point, Montana. He attended the University of Oklahoma thanks to Oscar Jacobson, and he graduated from Haskell Institute in 1924.

== Career ==
Standing began his career as an interior designer in Kansas. He moved back to Montana to become a painter, and he used pens, inks and oil to create his artwork. His paintings and postcard illustrations depicted the American West, especially the lives of Native Americans in the Northwestern United States.

Standing did many portraits of his grandfather and his great-grandfather. He also did a portrait of Charles Curtis, the 31st Vice President of the United States. He illustrated the book Land of Naboka in 1942.

His artwork was exhibited at the Arts Club of Washington as well as in Paris, France. According to his obituary in the Great Falls Tribune, he became "one of Montana's best known contemporary artists."

== Personal life, death and legacy ==
Standing had a child with his wife Nancy. They resided in Poplar, Montana.

Standing died in a car accident near Zortman in Phillips County on June 27, 1951, and his body was taken to Malta. He was 46. Some of his work is in the permanent collections of the Hockaday Museum of Art in Kalispell and the University of Montana's Montana Museum of Art & Culture in Missoula.
