= Standing (disambiguation) =

Standing is a human position in which the body is held upright.

Standing may also refer to:

- Standing (law), sufficient connection to support that party's participation in the case
  - Third-party standing, of the law of civil procedure
- Standing (surname)
- Social standing

== See also ==
- Good standing
- Standings (sports), a ranking of the teams in a sports league
- Standing stone (disambiguation)
