= Standing (surname) =

Standing is an English surname. Notable people with the surname include:

- Colin Standing, Welsh rugby league player
- David Standing (born 1963), English cricketer
- George Standing (born 1941), Canadian ice hockey player
- Guy Standing (actor) (1873–1937), English actor
- Guy Standing (economist) (born 1948), British economist
- Herbert Standing (1846–1923), English actor
- Herbert F. Standing (1857–1943), English paleontologist and missionary
- Jack Standing (1886–1917), English actor
- Joan Standing (1903–1979), English actress
- John Standing (born 1934), English actor
- Joseph Standing (1854–1879), American Mormon missionary
- Michael Standing (actor) (born 1939), English actor
- Michael Standing (footballer) (born 1981), English footballer
- Percy Standing (1882–1950), English actor
- Richard Standing, English actor
- William Standing (1904–1951), American painter and illustrator
- Wyndham Standing (1880–1963), English actor

== See also ==
- Standring
