= Crazy Bear (Assiniboine chief) =

Assiniboine tribe chief (c. 1785–1856)

Crazy Bear (c. 1785–1856) was a chief of the Assiniboine tribes of the northern plains. Their territory included Montana, North Dakota, Alberta and Saskatchewan. He is known as a skilled negotiator with the American Fur Company at Fort Union, North Dakota, and remembered for his participation and representation at the Fort Laramie Treaty Council of 1851—where he was a signatory of the treaty. He earned the name Mah-To-Wit-Ko (meaning "Crazy Bear") because he fought like a crazy bear. Wit-Ko is a Siouan word that has multiple translations: crazy, foolish, frightening and mad. Crazy Bear has been recorded by these names and also in French as Ours Fou (in various sketches and documents).

He had three granddaughters; Iron Cradle (aka Sweet Grass), Turtle Door, Small Earth, and two grandsons; Black Bull and Kill Eagle. Iron Cradle later became an historical figure of the early Fort Belknap Indian Reservation, now located in Montana.

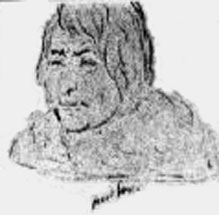
Crazy Bear 1785–1856 from The Kurz Sketchbook 1851 portrait labeled "Ours Fou"

== Early life ==
Crazy Bear was born in 1785 on the northern plains somewhere in the present day Montana, North Dakota, Alberta or Saskatchewan.

The environment into which he was born was rapidly changing. France, after taking back the Louisiana Territory from Spain, immediately sold it to the United States in the 1803 Louisiana Purchase. Some 200 years before, the Assiniboine had broken off from the Yankton Sioux, which spurred two centuries of continuous conflict between them and continual warfare.

Crazy Bear grew up living the traditional plains Indian life. He followed and hunted the buffalo and was taught the warrior culture. He lived a life of bravery and counted many coups. Young men learning the arts of hunting, raiding and fighting had a high mortality rate. These factors, together with European diseases and the pushing of alcohol upon the Native peoples, adversely impacted the survival of indigenous youth.

In 1805, the Lewis and Clark Expedition made contact with some Assiniboine "between the Assiniboin (river) and the Missouri, are two bands of Assiniboins, one on the Mouse River of about two hundred men, called Assiniboin Menatopa; the other residing on both sides of White River called by the French, Gens des Feuilles, amounting to two hundred and fifty men" The band Crazy Bear lived with were the Gens des Feuilles or The Little Girls band, in the Assiniboine language known as Waką́hežabina.

In a battle between the Assiniboine and the Gros Ventre, Crazy Bear fought desperately to protect the women and children of the camp. "The conduct of the chief in this emergency was said by his people to resemble the furious and fearless actions of a crazy bear, hence his name."

== Fur trade ==
Crazy Bear and others of his tribe participated in the burgeoning fur trade which had reached the high plains. The fur trade was originally represented by French traders known as the Coureurs des Bois (or Runners of the Woods) in the 18th and 19th centuries; and later as voyageurs and mountain men in the 19th century. Agents of Hudson's Bay Company, the North West Company, and the American Fur Company (AFC) built forts and competing trading posts along the rivers. At these facilities, Native Americans traded furs and buffalo robes for weapons, fabric, trinkets, and whiskey.

It was at one of these facilities in Ft. Union, Dakota Territory that Crazy Bear honed his negotiation skills. He was known as an honest, loyal and reliable trading partner. The agents of the AFC running Ft. Union made numerous journal entries regarding Crazy Bear. Charles Larpenteur of the AFC wrote in his journal in 1842 about another competing fur company's attempt to bribe Crazy Bear into switching affiliations. He wrote, "Mr. Cotton [an agent from Fort William] invited him into his room and made him a great speech, dressed him up in a splendid military suit, such as had never been brought into the country before, and then laid a two gallon keg of whiskey at his feet. Crazy Bear's band was at Union, waiting for his return; but, instead of going directly to them, he went into Mr. Culberson (the AFC agent)'s private room, not very drunk, took a seat, and remained some time without saying a word. Mr. Culbertson, surprised to see him so dressed, and thinking that he had lost his chief, was also silent. Finally, Crazy Bear broke the ice by saying, 'I suppose you think that I have left our big house. No, I am not a child. I went below to see the chief who treated me well. I did not ask him for anything. I did not refuse his presents. But these cannot make me abandon this house, where are buried the remains of our fathers, whose tracks are yet fresh in all the paths leading to this place. No I will not abandon this house!' After which he rose from his seat, and took off his fine fur hat and feathers, which he threw on the floor with all his might; then unbuckled his beautiful sword with which he did the same, and kept on till he had stripped himself of all his fine clothes, without speaking a word. When this performance was over, he said to Mr. Culbertson, who stood in great astonishment, 'Take away all these things and give me such as you see fit, and don't think I am a child who can be seduced with trinkets.' This Crazy Bear, who was not at all crazy, proved afterward to be the greatest Chief of the Assiniboine."

== Fort Laramie Treaty ==
By 1851, the traffic of white settlers traveling west through the northern plains had increased steadily. This resulted in the escalation of violent confrontation with the native peoples. In addition, the continued inter-tribal warfare affected the profits of the competing fur companies. The United States government devised a plan to bring a cessation of hostilities to the area. They prepared a document known as the Fort Laramie Treaty (1851), and summoned the leaders of all regional tribes to Fort Laramie, Wyoming to a treaty council and signing ceremony. The tribes invited included the Sioux, Cheyenne, Arapaho, Crow, Assiniboine, Mandan, Gros Ventre, Arikaree, and Shoshone. Many of these nations were enemies who had been fighting inter-tribal battles for centuries. Fort Laramie was in Sioux territory, and there was reluctance for many participants to travel to this remote location.

"When the circular issued by Col. Mitchell, then Supt. of Indian Affairs, was explained to the Assiniboines by Culbertson, not a single Indian except the Foolish Bear (Crazy Bear) would consent to go. They did not wish to risk themselves among the large body of Sioux on whose ground the treaty was to be held. Besides the road to Laramie being up on the Yellowstone in the summer, when that river is literally stocked with Blackfoot war parties, their deadly enemies, did not bode well for their safe arrival. The trip was one of extreme danger to all concerned, and nothing but the good council and great exertions of the above named gentleman induced the Indians to undertake it. After the Crazy Bear had determined to go, several others joined the expedition." Among those who traveled with him were Chief First to Fly, and Father De Smet, S.J.

Soldiers and civilians at Fort Laramie probably numbered under one hundred at the time of the treaty council. The officials who had expected only the leadership of the various tribes to arrive were astounded as the total number of attendees reached an estimated twelve thousand. The fort personnel and the civilian officials felt extremely frightened and feared that without warning they could be killed. They moved the treaty signing thirty five miles southeast to Henry, in modern-day Nebraska.

The U.S. government determined that in order to effectively negotiate they needed individual "Chiefs" to sign and represent their tribes. Crazy Bear designated as Chief for the Assiniboine.

The treaty required the cessation of all hostilities between individual tribes and white settlers, determined specific territories for each Indian nation, and guaranteed annuity payments from the U.S. government for fifty years. It also guaranteed protection to tribes from white depredations. The tribes guaranteed safe passage for white settlers traveling the various western trails and agreed to the establishment of U.S. Army forts.

The Chiefs signed and upheld their end of the treaty, but the U.S. government did not. The U.S. arbitrarily reduced the annuity payment from fifty years to ten years, and failed to keep white settlers, miners and hunters from trespassing on Indian territory. The U.S. government's attitude on the treaty and their failure to abide by it is illustrated in the Commissioner of Indian Affairs Annual Report of 1852 wherein Commissioner Lea states, "It is therefore, no matter of regret or reproach that so large a portion of our territory has been wrested from its aboriginal inhabitants and made the happy abodes of an enlightened and Christian people" and "much of the injury of which the red men and his complaints has been the inevitable consequence of his own perverse and vicious nature."

After signing the treaty together with Chief First to Fly, the U.S. government presented them with silver medals commemorating the event. Then they returned to Fort Union. "But the Chief on his arrival at Fort Union was fated to mourn the loss of some of his relatives. During his absence his son, Holy Seat, had been killed by the Blackfeet, his child died and his wife hung herself. ....though much grieved at what happened, yet he behaved like a man, and as soon as he could recover sufficient spirit proceeded to make known to his people the spirit of the treaty."

As a result of the U.S. government not being timely in the first annual annuities and goods promised, Crazy Bear was ridiculed and demeaned by his people. "The old Chief stood alone against his people and maintained the equanimity of his temper. He never swerved a particle ....though he had a hard time of it with his people. However, when the gentleman above named (Culbertson) came and issued out ten thousand dollars worth of goods as the governments presents for the first year, the Indians were struck dumb and those who before reproached now flattered their ruler."

=== Post-treaty ===
The Chief then administered his tribe and maintained a peaceful relationship with the U.S. government. As a result of his family tragedy, Crazy Bear took responsibility for and raised his granddaughter Sweet Grass (Iron Cradle).

In spite of the treaty, the native people of the Great Plains were suffering. Increased white encroachment, disease and diminishing resources troubled the Chief. In a letter to Father De Smet dated July 28, 1854, he wrote, "I see the buffaloes decrease every year. What will become of us without help? If our children are not instructed in time, they will disappear like the game."

== Death ==
Crazy Bear contracted smallpox and died at the age of seventy in 1856. The smallpox epidemic had struck the tribes of the northern plains with devastating results. The disease killed approximately 2,000 people, of which an estimated 1,200 were Assiniboines. "Crazy Bear is buried south of the river where Big Muddy empties into the Missouri River, up the river from there on the south side where there are bad land and a bunch of ash trees."

== Legacy ==
Crazy Bear was remembered in quotation from Denig stating, "The ruling Chief of the whole nation is named Mau to weet ko (Mah Toe Wit Ko) or the Foolish Bear (Crazy Bear), who has always considered a good and sensible man and lately confirmed in his office by the Commissioners at the Laramie Treaty. He is somewhat more elevated in his opinions than most of his people, but does not rank so high as a warrior as some, though he has on occasions shown an utter contempt of danger before his enemies. He is a mild, politic man, looking to the interests of his people and viewing with suspicion anything inconsistent with them. Even when a very young man he had a voice in council, respect was paid to his opinions, and he now conducts the affairs of the nation with great credit to himself and satisfaction of his followers. ....He is a sterling friend to all white men and his speeches exhibit considerable mental powers. At all events his whole mind is given to produce a good understanding between his people and the United States government. It is pleasant to perceive good and amiable qualities in a leader...."
