= Mosquito, Grizzly Bear's Head, Lean Man First Nations =

Indian reserve in Saskatchewan, Canada

Coordinates: 52°59′44″N 107°41′47″W

- Band No. 343
- People: Assiniboine
- Treaty: Treaty 4; Treaty 6
- Headquarters: Cando
- Province: Saskatchewan

Land
- Other reserves: Mosquito 109; Grizzly Bear's Head 110 & Lean Man's 111; Mosquito, Grizzly Bear's Head, Lean Man TLE 1; Gold Eagle Reserve
- Land area: 180.827 km^{2} (69.818 sq mi)

Population (2019)
- On reserve: 723
- Off reserve: 709
- Total population: 1432

Government
- Chief: Tanya Aguilar-Antiman Stone

Tribal Council
- Battlefords Agency Tribal Chiefs

Mosquito, Grizzly Bear's Head, Lean Man First Nations (Assiniboine: Capų́ga-Matópa-Hústaga oyáde) is the name of an Assiniboine First Nation in Saskatchewan, Canada. It is home to a population of about 400.

== Origin of the name and the constitution of the community ==
Circa 1890–1898, the tribal chief "Misketo" signed Treaty 6, formally incorporating three tribes that had settled in the area as one reserve:

- Mosquito Band #109
- the Grizzly Bear's Head Band #110
- the Lean Man Band #111

Thus, the formal English name now found on maps attempts to incorporate all three communities' names, sometimes with the inconsistent use of either hyphens or commas (or both) between them.

== Geography ==
Mosquito First Nation is an Assiniboine Nation located in the Eagle Hills approximately 30 kilometres (19 mi) south of Battleford, along the remains of the historic Swift Current–Battleford Trail. It is nearly 50,000 acres (200 km^{2}) in size and has over 1,000 members.

== History ==
In August 1878, Chief Mosquito signed an adhesion to Treaty 6 at Battleford after taking over the Band from Little Chief. Grizzly Bear's Head originally signed Treaty 4 under Tepee Hoska at Cypress Hills in 1877. The band migrated to the Battleford area after Tepee Hoska died in 1882. Both bands merged in 1951.

After signing an adhesion to Treaty 4, Lean Man Band settled in the Treaty 6 area south of Battleford in May 1882. By 1931 only one person remained in Lean Man Band, and they merged with Mosquito Grizzly Bear's Head. In 1948 the chief and council of the Mosquito Grizzly Bears Head Lean Man band declared that the three bands remain together for all time. If any band member wished to distinguish the band and separate the bands then that person and his family should leave the band altogether.

=== Lean Man ===
Lean Man took treaty on September 25, 1877, at Fort Walsh (when a number of Assiniboine/Stoney bands took treaty) and the band's annuity payments appeared under Treaty 4, but no reserve lands were set aside for them until 1884. They have been considered a Treaty 6 band since 1882. On the official Treaty 4 Adhesion document, the Nakoda words "Wica Hostaka" are written by the X of Lean Man. In the Nakoda/Assiniboine language, wica means 'man' and hostaka means 'lean'. During this period, as was the case with other bands, Lean Man did not take a reserve but continued to move back and forth across the border. In 1882, when Fort Walsh was closed, Lean Man moved north into Treaty 6 territory and were given a reserve along with Grizzly Bear's Head (reserve lands 110 and 111) – this band was therefore listed under Treaty 6 for all future treaty annuity payments. In 1885, the band participated in the North-West Rebellion, and their annuities were suspended from 1885 to 1887. Many band members fled to the US along with other "rebel Indians".

=== Grizzly Bear's Head ===
During the 1877 treaty adhesion meeting at Fort Walsh, some groups were refused permission to sign as they had been receiving annuity payments from the US in Montana. One such band was Little Chief's, a "British" band who had relocated to Montana. As had been the case with other bands, this group moved back and forth across the border, with both the Canadian and American authorities trying to stop the cross-border movement. In 1879, Little Chief's band moved back into Canada and was paid annuity, listed in the Treaty 4 paylist and paid the arrears for 1876 to 1878. There is no indication that Little Chief took a formal adhesion to the treaty. In 1880, Chief Bear's Head is listed as the chief of the band and the band is subsequently listed as "Bear's Head band". In 1882 after the closure of Fort Walsh and as part of the same move as Lean Man, the band relocated northwards to the same reserve as Lean Man's (reserve lands 110 and 111) and was therefore listed under Treaty 6 for all future treaty annuity payments. During the 1885 rebellion, Grizzly Bear's Head rose up against the Crown. Just like Lean Man, their annuities were suspended between 1885 and 1887. After the rebellion, the majority of the band fled to the US or dispersed to other bands.

=== Mosquito ===
Chief Misketo (also known as Sukeman) signed an adhesion to Treaty 6 on August 29, 1878, and record of their annuity payment appears in the 1878 Treaty 6 paylist. The survey for their reserve lands were conducted in 1879 and were adjacent to those of Red Pheasant in the Eagle Hills (reserve no. 109 – this reserve was surrendered in 1905). The band participated in the 1885 rebellion against the Crown, and their annuities were subsequently suspended between 1885 and 1887. After the rebellion, a large number of the band fled to the US or dispersed to other bands.

Chief Mosquito remained the primary chief of the three bands of Mosquito, Grizzly Bears Head, Lean Man First Nations. Mosquito Grizzly Bears Head Lean Man Band is regarded as a member of the Treaty Four and Treaty Six areas, and is the only band in Canada with this status. Treaty Four Gatherings in the Fort Qu'Appelle area reserve a place in their council meetings for the Mosquito Grizzly Bears Head Lean Man Band.

=== Contemporary ===
In August 2022, they became signatories of the Buffalo Treaty.

== See also ==
- List of Indian reserves in Saskatchewan
