= Carry the Kettle Nakoda Nation =

First Nation in Saskatchewan

Coordinates: 50.445465°N 103.392211°W

- Band No. 76
- People: Nakoda
- Treaty: Treaty 4
- Headquarters: Indian Head
- Province: Saskatchewan

Land
- Main reserve: Assiniboine 76
- Reserves: Carry the Kettle 76-1; through -87

Population (2019)
- On reserve: 892
- On other land: 0
- Off reserve: 2029
- Total population: 2921

Government
- Chief: Dwayne thomson
- Council: Shawn Spencer Terrina Bellegarde Craig wesaquate Joellen Haywahe Melissa Eashappie Diamond Blenman

Tribal Council
- File Hills Qu'Appelle Tribal Council

Website
- cegakin.com

Carry the Kettle Nakoda Nation (Assiniboine: Ceġa'kin Nakoda Oyadebi [Chay-gah-keen oya-day], "Carries the kettle", also known as Assiniboine First Nation or Assiniboine 76) is a Nakota (Assiniboine) First Nation in Canada located about 80 km (50 mi) east of Regina, Saskatchewan, and 13 km (8.1 mi) south of Sintaluta. The reservation is in Treaty 4 territory.

The Cypress Hills, known as traditional Nakoda/Assiniboine territory, are within the boundaries of Treaty 4. Bands signed a treaty and were also given reservations within their traditional territories.

Other previous names of the Carry the Kettle Nakoda/Assiniboine band have been:

- Chief Man Who Takes the Coat Reserve #76
- Chief Long Lodge Reserve #77
- Hurricane Hills reserve #76
- Jack's Reserve #76
- Indian Head reserve #76
- Assiniboine Reserve #76
- Carry the Kettle First Nation #76
- Assiniboine #76

== History ==
In the 17th century, the Assiniboine along with the Plains Cree and other ethnic groups formed the Nehiyew Pwat (Cree Assiniboine) or Iron Confederacy. The Iron Alliance was a political and military alliance. This confederacy included various individual bands that allied together against common enemies. They were and are traditional enemies of the Lakota and Dakota nation.

The band are modern-day descendants of the victims of the Cypress Hills Massacre that happened on June 1, 1873 near Battle Creek, Cypress Hills, NWT. The massacre emerged over a dispute about around 40 horses allegedly stolen by the Assiniboine from wolf hunters staying at Moses Solomon's trading post and Moses Solomon himself. The conflict resulted in the death of 20 tribal members. It was one of the final events that prompted the Canadian Federal government to create the NWMP (short for the North West Mounted Police, which is today replaced by the Royal Canadian Mounted Police). The massacre's site became a designated national historic site of Canada in 1964. Fort Walsh was established in June 1875, 2 km south of the massacre's site.

In 1859, John Palliser's expedition identified the Cypress Hills as "Assiniboine country/territory" after meeting Blackfoot guides near present-day Medicine Hat, Alberta. When Palliser asked the Blackfeet to join them on the trek into the Cypress Hills, they instantly refused. The Blackfeet guides told Palliser that those were their enemies and the hills were Assiniboine country. In 1879, bison became extinct on the great prairies.

In 1880, DLS surveyor Allan Ponytz Patrick conducted a DLS survey for the Carry the Kettle Nakoda Nation's land. The size of the reserve was 340 square miles.

In 1885, the hanging of 11 Indians at Fort Battleford was marked by a comment by a Nakoda sentenced to hang. Words of Wawanetch, member of Lean Mans Assiniboine band, formerly of Assiniboine tribe of Treaty 4 in Cypress Hills, to Middleton: "the creator sees all, you stole our land and our children". Lean Man signed adhesion to Treaty 4 along with Man Who Takes the Coat and Long Lodge. He later joined Mosquito and Grizzly Bears head in Treaty 6 in 1882.

== Treaty 4 adhesion ==
The ancestors of the nation signed adhesion to Treaty 4 at Fort Walsh on September 25, 1877. The three Assiniboine chiefs who signed the treaty were Man Who Takes The Coat (Cuwiknaga Je Eyaku, in the Assiniboine/Nakoda language), Long Lodge (Teepee Hanska), and Lean Man (Wica Hostaka). After signing the treaty, the federal government began creating three separate reserves in the fall of 1879 in the Cypress Hills for these 3 Assiniboine, Treaty 4 signatory chiefs. as Edgar Dewdney made his way into the Cypress Hills as the new Indian Commissioner and exercised the "duty to consult" in Treaties 4, 6, and 7 in 1879.

== Reserve creation ==
The Nakoda elders refer to their ancestral home in the Cypress Hills as Wazihe (the mountain by itself). Elders also speak of Hay-Ipa (literally in Nakoda language: Head of a Mountain, a spiritual place for the Nakoda). The original Assiniboine Reservation at the Head of the Mountain covered 340 square miles (880 km^{2}).

== Present day ==
In 2000, the Indian Claims Commission ruled that Canada had no lawful obligation to Cega'kin (Carry the Kettle) and that no reservation was legally established at Cypress Hills for Assiniboine descendants from 1879 to 1882. In 2014, the land claim was in federal court. The Indian Claims Commission relied heavily on a report done for the department of Indian Affairs by James (Jim) Gallo.

Gallo stated in the document that the Assiniboine reserve could not have been established and recognized because there was no reserve creation activity in the Cypress Hills because the nearest Indian Affairs office was at Swan River, MB. However the Fort Walsh Town Site had an Indian Affairs Office established in the Cypress Hills in 1879. Edwin Allen was the first Indian Agent there.

Carry the Kettle sued the federal and Saskatchewan governments in December 2017 to halt development which would infringe on its members' rights to hunt and gather. In January 2020, it was announced that the nation would join Indigenous Bloom in a cannabis facility on reserve land.

Other previous names of the Carry the Kettle Nakoda/Assiniboine band have been:

- Chief Man Who Takes the Coat Reserve #76
- Chief Long Lodge Reserve #77
- Hurricane Hills reserve #76
- Jack's Reserve #76
- Indian Head reserve #76
- Assiniboine Reserve #76
- Carry the Kettle First Nation #76
- Assiniboine #76

== Literature ==
Tanner, Jim; Miller, David R.; McGuire, Peggy Martin (2022). Owóknage: The Story of Carry the Kettle Nakoda First Nation. University of Regina Press. ISBN 978-0889778146.
