= HMCS Assiniboine =

Two Canadian naval units have been named HMCS Assiniboine.

- HMCS Assiniboine (I18) (I) was a River-class destroyer that served the Royal Canadian Navy during the Second World War. She was formerly the Royal Navy's Interwar Standard C-class destroyer HMS Kempenfelt (I18).
- HMCS Assiniboine (DDH 234) was a St. Laurent-class destroyer escort that served the Royal Canadian Navy and later the Canadian Forces during the Cold War.

== Battle honours ==
- Atlantic 1939-45
- Biscay, 1944
- English Channel 1944-45
