= Wi-jún-jon =

Assiniboine tribe leader (c. 1796–1835)

Pigeon's Egg Head
- Wi-jún-jon
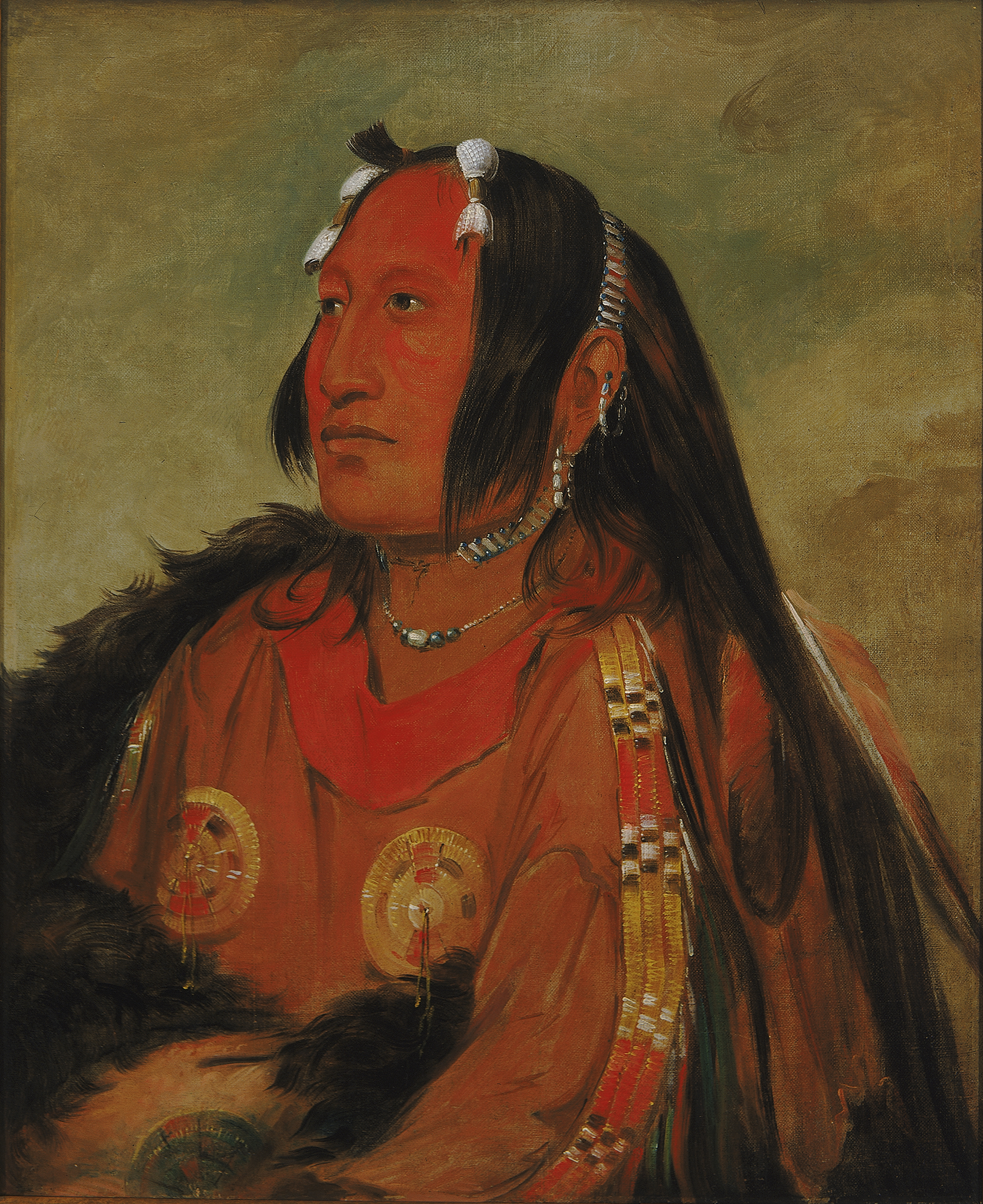
- Portrait by George Catlin, 1831

Assiniboine leader

Personal details
- Born: c. 1796
- Died: 1835
- Nickname: The Light

Wi-jún-jon, also called Pigeon's Egg Head or The Light (c. 1796–1835) was a leader of the Assiniboine tribe, which was located in the Great Plains at that time. He is best known as the subject of a painting by George Catlin, a dual portrait portraying him on the left side of the portrait in traditional garb and on the right side in contemporary Anglo-American garb after he was assimilated following an 18-month visit to Washington, D.C. and other cities in 1831 and 1832.

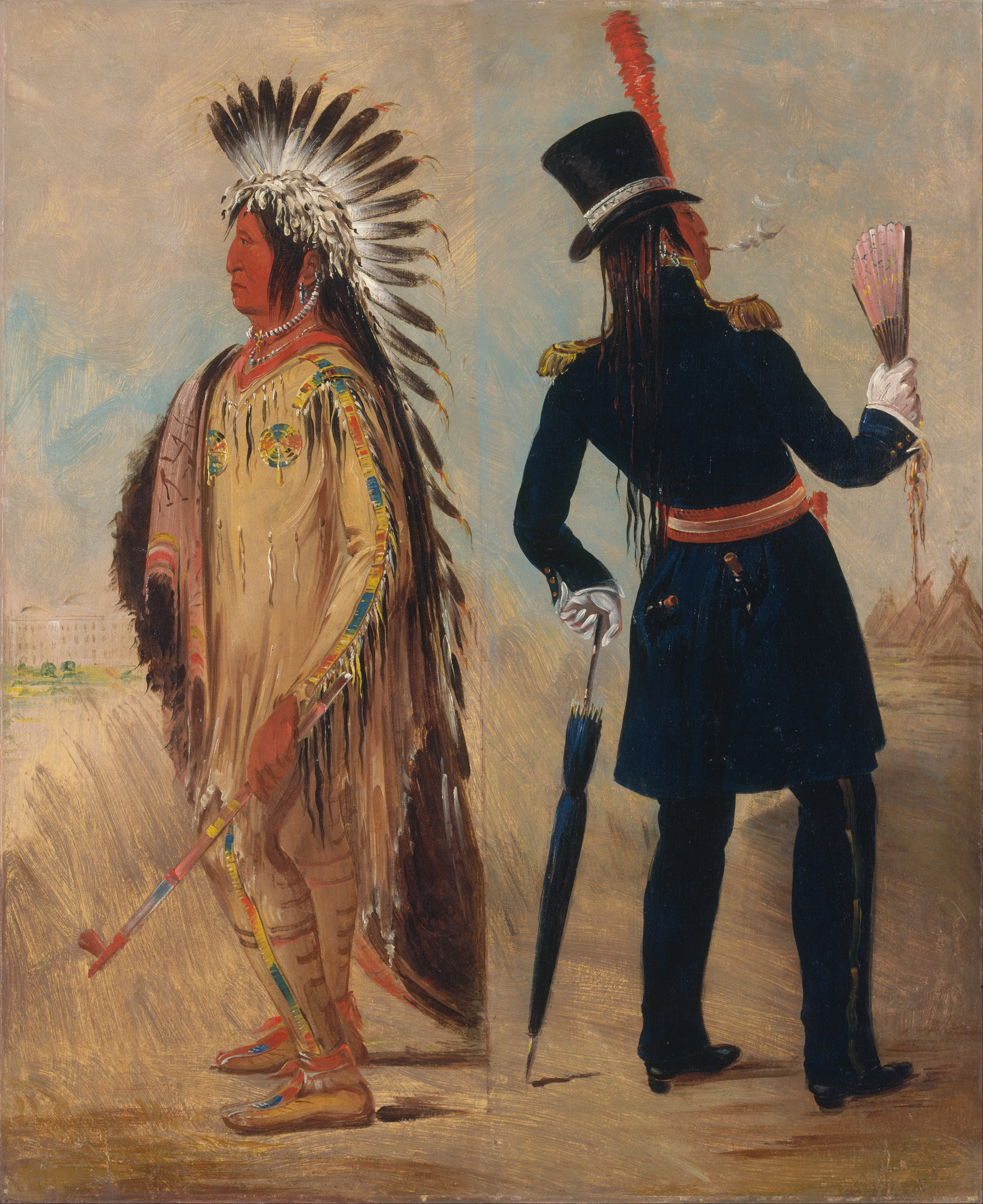
Wi-jún-jon before and after his trip to Washington, DC by George Catlin, c. 1837-39

Catlin wrote that Wi-jún-jon "exchanged his beautifully garnished and classic costume" for a suit of "broadcloth, of finest blue, trimmed with lace of gold; on his shoulders were mounted two immense epaulets; his neck was strangled with a shining black stock and his feet were pinioned in a pair of water-proof boots, with high heels which made him 'step like a yoked hog'."

A print based on the painting, showing Wi-jún-jon wearing Assiniboine dress and a Western suit, titled Wi-jún-jon, Pigeon's Egg Head, Going to Washington, returning to his house, became quite popular, appearing in a German magazine, Die Gartenlaube in 1853.

When Wi-jún-jon returned to his tribe on the Missouri River steamboat Yellow Stone, his fellow Assiboine initially were interested in and amused by his descriptions of the power of the United States. Soon, though, they considered him a nuisance, and eventually, "an evil magician and an outrageous liar". Three years after his return, a tribesmen murdered and scalped him. Catlin purchased the scalp from a trader and displayed it at exhibitions of his paintings.
