= Mosquito 109 =

Indian reserve in Saskatchewan, Canada

Coordinates: 52°30′31″N 108°16′17″W

- Indian reserve
- Mosquito Indian Reserve No. 109
- Location in Saskatchewan
- First Nation: Mosquito, Grizzly Bear's Head, Lean Man
- Country: Canada
- Province: Saskatchewan

Area
  - Total: 9,297.9 ha (22,976 acres)

Population (2016)
  - Total: 478
  - Density: 5.14/km^{2} (13.3/sq mi)
- Community Well-Being Index: 42

Mosquito 109 is an Indian reserve of the Mosquito, Grizzly Bear's Head, Lean Man First Nations in Saskatchewan. It is about 27 kilometres (17 mi) south of North Battleford. In the 2016 Canadian Census, it recorded a population of 478 living in 107 of its 113 total private dwellings. In the same year, its Community Well-Being index was calculated at 42 of 100, compared to 58.4 for the average First Nations community and 77.5 for the average non-Indigenous community. Access is from Highway 4.

== See also ==
- List of Indian reserves in Saskatchewan
