= Oswego, Montana =

- Unincorporated community
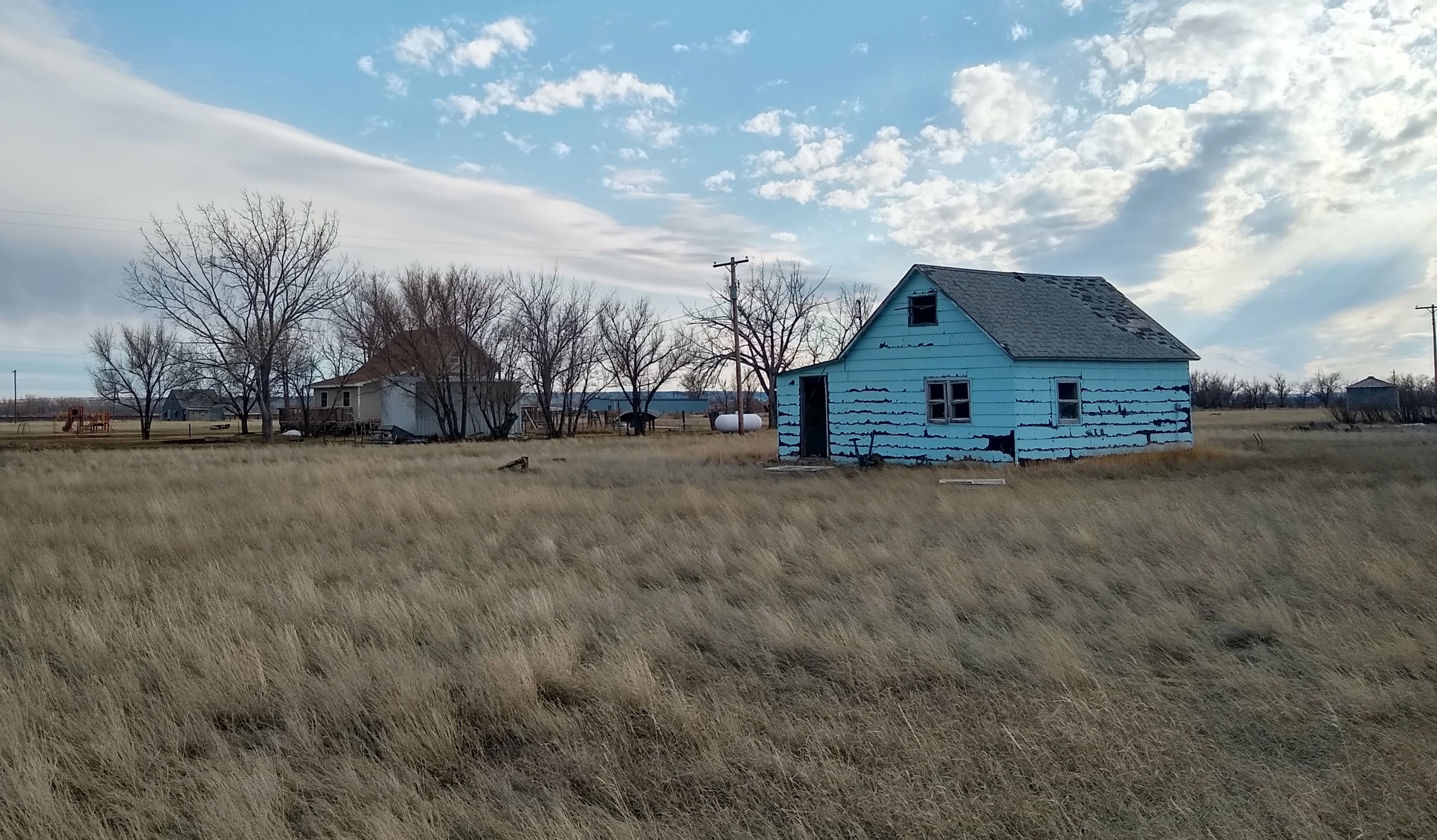
- Abandoned house in Owsego Montana

- Location within the state of Montana
- Coordinates: 48°3′31″N 105°52′52″W
- Country: United States
- State: Montana
- County: Valley
- Elevation: 2,028 ft (618 m)
- Time zone: UTC-7 (Mountain (MST))
  - Summer (DST): UTC-6 (MDT)
- GNIS feature ID: 774988

Oswego (/ɒsˈwiːɡoʊ/ oss-WEE-goh) is an unincorporated community in Valley County, Montana, United States. It is located along U.S. Route 2 between the cities of Frazer and Wolf Point. Oswego is located on the Fort Peck Indian Reservation.

== History ==
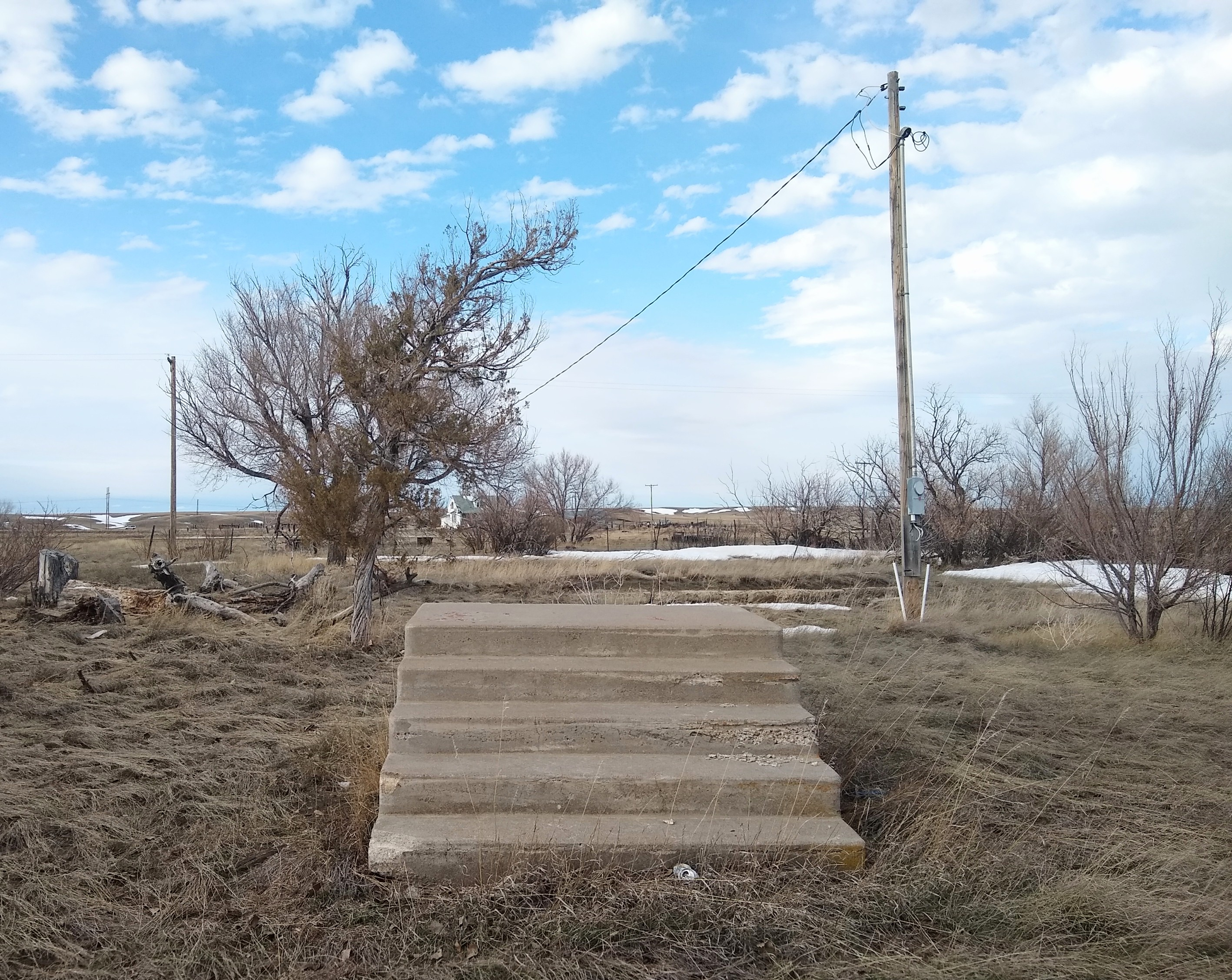
Steps to a house in Oswego Montana probably burned down in 1971 in a prairie fire, never rebuilt

Settled sometime in the 1890s, the village was named after Oswego, New York, the hometown of some early-day settlers.

=== 1971 fire ===
On September 11, 1971, one of the worst prairie fires in northeastern Montana destroyed much of Oswego, burning 18,000 acres (7,300 ha) and causing 1,000 volunteer firefighters to be mobilised. There were no deaths, but most of Oswego's buildings were burnt down; only four homes were left untouched. The post office, general store and a grain elevator were destroyed; the school, another grain elevator and a bar survived.

On September 14, Oswego was declared a disaster area by Thomas L. Judge, the acting Governor of Montana. A primary election for the Montana constitutional convention went ahead as scheduled with voting held in the schoolhouse. The Post Office Department announced it would not rebuild its office and that all future post would be delivered to Wolf Point; according to The New York Times, the department "had been trying to close its tiny operation in Oswego" even before the fire. Of the 14 families whose houses were destroyed, 12 decided to rebuild.

== Transportation ==
Amtrak's Empire Builder, which operates between Seattle/Portland and Chicago, passes through the small town on BNSF tracks, but makes no stop. The nearest station is located in Wolf Point, 12 miles (19 km) to the east.Its located on US Route 2
