= Carry the Kettle 76-1 =

Indian reserve in Saskatchewan, Canada

Coordinates: 50°19′22″N 103°16′34″W

- Indian reserve
- Carry the Kettle Indian Reserve No. 76-1
- Location in Saskatchewan
- First Nation: Carry the Kettle
- Country: Canada
- Province: Saskatchewan

Area
  - Total: 192.4 ha (475 acres)

Carry the Kettle 76-1 is an Indian reserve of the Carry the Kettle Nakoda First Nation in Saskatchewan. It is 21 kilometres north-east of Sintaluta.

The reserve is located near the south-west end of Katepwa Lake.

== See also ==
- List of Indian reserves in Saskatchewan
