= Assiniboine 76 =

Indian reserve in Saskatchewan, Canada

Coordinates: 50°20′45″N 103°29′02″W

- Indian reserve
- Assiniboine Indian Reserve No. 76
- Location in Saskatchewan
- First Nation: Carry the Kettle
- Country: Canada
- Province: Saskatchewan

Area
  - Total: 16,590.4 ha (40,996 acres)

Population (2016)
  - Total: 443
  - Density: 2.67/km^{2} (6.92/sq mi)
- Community Well-Being Index: 54

Assiniboine 76 is an Indian reserve of the Carry the Kettle Nakoda First Nation in Saskatchewan. It is 80 kilometers east of Regina. In the 2016 Canadian Census, it recorded a population of 443 living in 182 of its 214 total private dwellings. In the same year, its Community Well-Being index was calculated at 54 of 100, compared to 58.4 for the average First Nations community and 77.5 for the average non-Indigenous community.

== See also ==
- List of Indian reserves in Saskatchewan
