= Standring =

Standring is a surname. Notable people with the surname include:

- Chris Standring (born 1960), British jazz guitarist
- Glenn Standring, New Zealand scriptwriter
- Heather Standring (born 1928), British illustrator
- Keith Standring (born 1965), English cricketer
- Kenneth Standring (born 1935), English cricketer
- Susan Standring (born 1947), British neuroscientist

== See also ==
- Standring Inlet, an inlet of Graham Land, Antarctica
