= Mosquito, Grizzly Bear's Head, Lean Man TLE 1 =

Coordinates: 53°01′50″N 107°38′41″W

- Indian reserve
- Mosquito, Grizzly Bear's Head, Lean Man Treaty Land Entitlement No. 1
- Location in Saskatchewan
- First Nation: Mosquito, Grizzly Bear's Head, Lean Man
- Country: Canada
- Province: Saskatchewan

Area
  - Total: 5,305.1 ha (13,109 acres)

Mosquito, Grizzly Bear's Head, Lean Man TLE 1 is an Indian reserve of the Mosquito, Grizzly Bear's Head, Lean Man First Nations in Saskatchewan.
