= Grizzly Bear's Head 110 & Lean Man 111 =

Indian reserve in Saskatchewan, Canada

Coordinates: 52°33′29″N 108°15′11″W

Grizzly Bear's Head 110 & Lean Man's 111
- Indian reserve
- Grizzly Bear's Head Indian Reserve No. 110 & Lean Man's Indian Reserve No. 111
- Location in Saskatchewan
- First Nation: Mosquito, Grizzly Bear's Head, Lean Man
- Country: Canada
- Province: Saskatchewan

Area
  - Total: 3,476.4 ha (8,590 acres)

Population (2016)
  - Total: 67
  - Density: 1.9/km^{2} (5.0/sq mi)
- Community Well-Being Index: 50

Grizzly Bear's Head 110 & Lean Man's 111 is an Indian reserve of the Mosquito, Grizzly Bear's Head, Lean Man First Nations in Saskatchewan Canada. It is about 24 kilometres (15 mi) south of North Battleford. In the 2016 Canadian Census, it recorded a population of 67 living in 17 of its 19 total private dwellings. In the same year, its Community Well-Being index was calculated at 50 of 100, compared to 58.4 for the average First Nations community and 77.5 for the average non-Indigenous community. Access is from Highway 4.

== See also ==
- List of Indian reserves in Saskatchewan
