= Standing stone (disambiguation) =

A standing stone or standingstone is a menhir, a large man-made upright stone, typically dating from the European middle Bronze Age. Standing stone may also refer to:

- Standing Stone (album), a 1997 album by Paul McCartney
- Standing Stone Township, Pennsylvania
- Standing Stone Creek, Pennsylvania
- Standing Stone State Park, Tennessee
- Standing Stone Trail, Pennsylvania
- The Standing Stone, a module for the role-playing game Dungeons & Dragons
- The Standing Stones, a video game published by Electronic Arts in 1984.
- A stele, a type of ancient monument
