= Gold Eagle Reserve =

Indian reserve in Saskatchewan, Canada

Coordinates: 52°45′28″N 108°16′10″W

- Indian reserve
- Gold Eagle Indian Reserve
- Location in Saskatchewan
- First Nation: Mosquito, Grizzly Bear's Head, Lean Man
- Country: Canada
- Province: Saskatchewan

Area
  - Total: 3.3 ha (8.2 acres)

The Gold Eagle Reserve is an Indian reserve of the Mosquito, Grizzly Bear's Head, Lean Man First Nations in Saskatchewan. It is an urban reserve in the city of North Battleford.

== See also ==
- List of Indian reserves in Saskatchewan
