= Saskatchewan Highway 342 =

Provincial highway in Saskatchewan, Canada

Highway 342

Route information
- Maintained by Ministry of Highways and Infrastructure
- Length: 123.3 km (76.6 mi)

Major junctions
- West end: Highway 44 at Plato
- Highway 4 near Kyle
- East end: Highway 42 near Beechy

Location
- Country: Canada
- Province: Saskatchewan
- Rural municipalities: Snipe Lake, Lacadena, Victory

Highway system
- Provincial highways in Saskatchewan
← Highway 340	→ Highway 343

Highway 342 is a provincial highway in the Canadian province of Saskatchewan. It runs from Highway 42 to Range Road 3183 near Plato and Highway 44. It is about 123 kilometres (76 mi) long.

The highway passes near Beechy, White Bear, Kyle, Lacadena, Tyner, Plato, and Clearwater Lake Regional Park. It connects with Highways 647, 4, and 737.

== Route description ==
Highway 342 begins in the Rural Municipality of Snipe Lake No. 259 just immediately to the south of the hamlet of Plato at an intersection with Highway 44, with the road continuing north into Plato as Range Road 3183. It heads south across slightly hilly terrain to enter the Rural Municipality of Lacadena No. 228, where it makes an abrupt sharp left to travel through the hamlet of Tyner before turning back south via sharp right a couple kilometres later. After having an intersection with Highway 647, it travels along the eastern side of the hamlet of Lacadena, where it crosses a former railway line, before curving eastward as it climbs some hills. Continuing through rural hilly terrain, the highway goes through a switchback as it passes through the hamlet of White Bear, crossing several small streams on its way to cross the Big Sky Rail Matador subdivision and Highway 4 a couple kilometres north of the town of Kyle. Now entering the Coteau Hills, Highway 342 meanders its way through the hilly terrain, passing by Clearwater Lake Regional Park and entering the Rural Municipality of Victory No. 226. After traversing the range for a few more kilometres, it lowers in elevation as it leaves the hills behind and traverses flat farmland, curving northward to pass through the village of Beechy, where it has an intersection with Highway 737 (Railway Avenue) and passes by the end of Big Sky Rail's Conquest subdivision. Continuing north, the highway goes through a switchback on its way to come to an end at the intersection with Highway 42. The entire length of Highway 342 is a paved, two-lane highway.

== Major intersections ==
Rural municipality	Location	km	mi	Destinations	Notes
Snipe Lake No. 259	Plato	0.0	0.0	Highway 44 – Eston, Elrose; Range Road 3183 – Plato	Western terminus; road continues north as Range Road 3183
Lacadena No. 228		16.2	10.1	Township Road 240 – Eston Riverside Regional Park, Lancer Ferry	
Lacadena No. 228		27.6	17.1	Highway 647 east – Sanctuary	Western terminus of Hwy 647
Lacadena No. 228	Lacadena	30.0	18.6	Main Street – Lacadena	
Lacadena No. 228	Lacadena	30.8	19.1	Railway Avenue – Lacadena	
Lacadena No. 228	White Bear	46.7	29.0	Main Street – White Bear	
Lacadena No. 228	White Bear	47.1	29.3	Range Road 3170 – White Bear	
Lacadena No. 228		61.5	38.2	Highway 4 – Rosetown, Kyle, Swift Current	
Lacadena No. 228	Clearwater Lake Regional Park	68.2	42.4	Clearwater Lake Regional Park	Access road into park
Victory No. 226	Beechy	111.9	69.5	Highway 737 east (Railway Avenue) – Demaine	Western terminus of Hwy 737
Victory No. 226		123.3	76.6	Highway 42 – Dinsmore, Lucky Lake	Eastern terminus
1.000 mi = 1.609 km; 1.000 km = 0.621 mi

== See also ==
- Transportation in Saskatchewan
- Roads in Saskatchewan
