= Saskatchewan Landing =

Saskatchewan Landing may refer to:

- Rural Municipality of Saskatchewan Landing No. 167, Saskatchewan, Canada
- Saskatchewan Landing Provincial Park, a provincial park in Saskatchewan, Canada
