= Wartime =

Wartime may refer to:

- Wartime, Saskatchewan, a small community in Saskatchewan, Canada
- Wartime, a formal state of war, as opposed to peacetime
- Wartime (film), a 1987 science fiction film spin-off of the TV series Doctor Who
- Wartime: Understanding and Behavior in the Second World War, a 1989 book by Paul Fussell
- Wartime, a 1977 book by Yugoslav politician Milovan Djilas
