= Rural Municipality of Lacadena No. 228 =

Rural municipality in Saskatchewan, Canada

Lacadena No. 228
- Rural municipality
- Rural Municipality of Lacadena No. 228
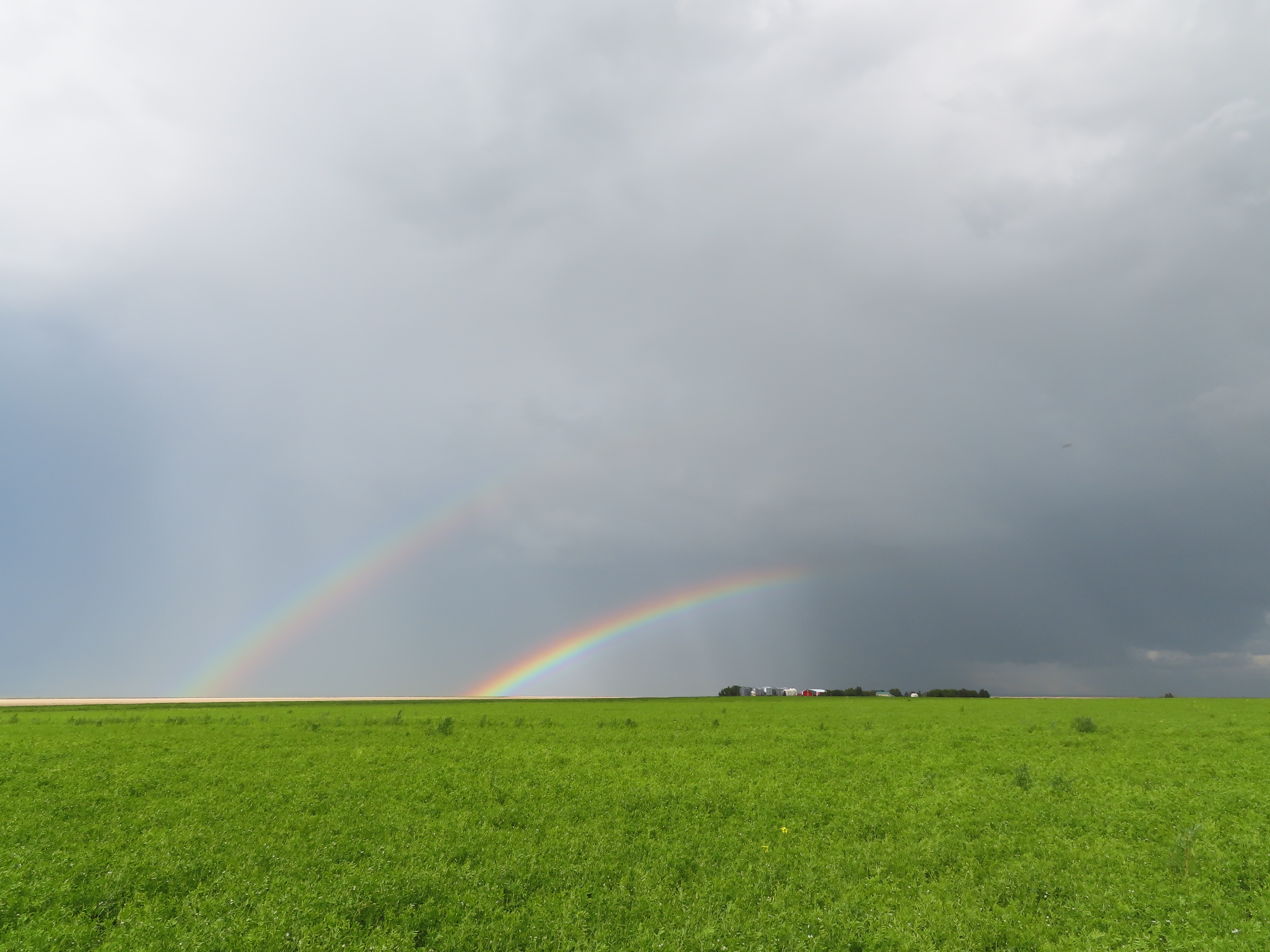
- Double rainbow along Highway 4

- Location of the RM of Lacadena No. 228 in Saskatchewan
- Coordinates: 50.759°N 108.212°W
- Country: Canada
- Province: Saskatchewan
- Census division: 8
- SARM division: 3
- Formed: December 12, 1910

Government
  - Reeve: Bradley Sander
  - Governing body: RM of Lacadena No. 228 Council
  - Administrator: Yvonne Nelson
  - Office location: Kyle

Area (2016)
  - Land: 1,895.97 km^{2} (732.04 sq mi)

Population (2016)
  - Total: 535
  - Density: 0.3/km^{2} (0.78/sq mi)
- Time zone: CST
  - Summer (DST): CST
- Area codes: 306 and 639

The Rural Municipality of Lacadena No. 228 (2016 population: 535) is a rural municipality (RM) in the Canadian province of Saskatchewan within Census Division No. 8 and SARM Division No. 3.

== History ==
The RM of Lacadena No. 228 incorporated as a rural municipality on December 12, 1910.

== Geography ==
=== Communities and localities ===
The following urban municipalities are surrounded by the RM.

Towns

- Kyle

The following unincorporated communities are within the RM.

Organized hamlets

- White Bear

Localities

- High Point
- Lacadena
- Matador
- Mondou
- Saltburn
- Sanctuary
- Tuberose
- Tyner

== Demographics ==
Population history (1981–2016)
Year	Pop.	±%
1981	987	—
1986	968	−1.9%
1991	888	−8.3%
1996	786	−11.5%
2001	708	−9.9%
2006	613	−13.4%
2011	572	−6.7%
2016	535	−6.5%
Source: Statistics Canada via Saskatchewan Bureau of Statistics

In the 2021 Census of Population conducted by Statistics Canada, the RM of Lacadena No. 228 had a population of 787 living in 290 of its 613 total private dwellings, a change of 47.1% from its 2016 population of 535. With a land area of 1,896.92 km^{2} (732.40 sq mi), it had a population density of 0.4/km^{2} (1.1/sq mi) in 2021.

In the 2016 Census of Population, the RM of Lacadena No. 228 recorded a population of 535 living in 244 of its 553 total private dwellings, a −6.5% change from its 2011 population of 572. With a land area of 1,895.97 km^{2} (732.04 sq mi), it had a population density of 0.3/km^{2} (0.7/sq mi) in 2016.

== Attractions ==
- Clearwater Lake Regional Park
- Saskatchewan Landing Provincial Park
- World's Biggest Polar Bear - White Bear

== Government ==
The RM of Lacadena No. 228 is governed by an elected municipal council and an appointed administrator that meets on the first Tuesday of every month. The reeve of the RM is Bradley Sander while its administrator is Yvonne Nelson. The RM's office is located in Kyle.

== Transportation ==
- Saskatchewan Highway 4
- Saskatchewan Highway 342
- Saskatchewan Highway 647
- Kyle Airport
- Canadian National Railway
- Big Sky Rail

== See also ==
- List of rural municipalities in Saskatchewan
