= Forgan, Saskatchewan =

Community in Saskatchewan, Canada

Forgan
- Hamlet
- Location within Monet No. 257 Location within Saskatchewan
- Coordinates: 51.2684°N 107.8013°W
- Country: Canada
- Province: Saskatchewan
- Region: Southwest
- Rural municipality: Monet No. 257
- Established: 1913

Government
  - Reeve: George Myers
  - Administrator: Lori McDonald
  - Governing body: Monet No. 257
  - MLA: Jim Reiter
  - MP: Jeremy Patzer

Area
  - Total: 0.00 km^{2} (0 sq mi)

Population (2006)
  - Total: 0
  - Density: 0/km^{2} (0/sq mi)
- Time zone: CST
- Postal code: S0L 0Z0
- Area code: 306
- Highways: Highway 44
- Railways: Canadian National Railway

Forgan is an unincorporated hamlet located in the Rural Municipality of Monet No. 257, Saskatchewan, Canada. The Post Office was open from 1913 and defunct in 1986.

== See also ==
- List of communities in Saskatchewan
- List of hamlets in Saskatchewan
