= Rural Municipality of Monet No. 257 =

Rural municipality in Saskatchewan, Canada

Monet No. 257
- Rural municipality
- Rural Municipality of Monet No. 257

- Location of the RM of Monet No. 257 in Saskatchewan
- Coordinates: 51.193°N 108.023°W
- Country: Canada
- Province: Saskatchewan
- Census division: 8
- SARM division: 3
- Formed: December 13, 1909

Government
  - Reeve: Duncan Campbell
  - Governing body: RM of Monet No. 257 Council
  - Administrator: Meghan Nickason
  - Office location: Elrose

Area (2016)
  - Land: 1,591.7 km^{2} (614.6 sq mi)

Population (2016)
  - Total: 445
  - Density: 0.3/km^{2} (0.78/sq mi)
- Time zone: CST
  - Summer (DST): CST
- Area codes: 306 and 639

The Rural Municipality of Monet No. 257 (2016 population: 445) is a rural municipality (RM) in the Canadian province of Saskatchewan within Census Division No. 8 and SARM Division No. 3. It is located in the southwest portion of the province.

== History ==
The RM of Monet No. 257 incorporated as a rural municipality on December 13, 1909.

== Geography ==
=== Communities and localities ===
The following urban municipalities are surrounded by the RM.

Towns

- Elrose

The following unincorporated communities are within the RM.

Localities

- Chipperfield
- Forgan
- Greenan
- Gunnworth
- Hughton
- Lille
- Wartime

== Demographics ==
Population history (1981–2016)
Year	Pop.	±%
1981	836	—
1986	818	−2.2%
1991	667	−18.5%
1996	613	−8.1%
2001	564	−8.0%
2006	479	−15.1%
2011	495	+3.3%
2016	445	−10.1%
Source: Statistics Canada via Saskatchewan Bureau of Statistics

In the 2021 Census of Population conducted by Statistics Canada, the RM of Monet No. 257 had a population of 432 living in 139 of its 162 total private dwellings, a change of −2.9% from its 2016 population of 445. With a land area of 1,587.99 km^{2} (613.13 sq mi), it had a population density of 0.3/km^{2} (0.7/sq mi) in 2021.

In the 2016 Census of Population, the RM of Monet No. 257 recorded a population of 445 living in 136 of its 155 total private dwellings, a −10.1% change from its 2011 population of 495. With a land area of 1,591.7 km^{2} (614.6 sq mi), it had a population density of 0.3/km^{2} (0.7/sq mi) in 2016.

== Attractions ==
There is a historical site, a regional park, and a museum located within the RM.

- Hughton Medicine Wheel, in Hughton: an archeological site consisting of a central cairn, radiating walkways.
- Elrose Brick School Museum
- Elrose Regional Park

== Government ==
The RM of Monet No. 257 is governed by an elected municipal council and an appointed administrator that meets on the second Thursday of every month. The reeve of the RM is Duncan Campbell while its administrator is Meghan Nickason. The RM's office is located in Elrose.

== Transportation ==
- Saskatchewan Highway 4
- Saskatchewan Highway 44
- Saskatchewan Highway 664
- Saskatchewan Highway 751
- Saskatchewan Highway 752
- Canadian National Railway

== See also ==
- List of rural municipalities in Saskatchewan
