= Lacadena, Saskatchewan =

Community in Saskatchewan, Canada

Lacadena
- Hamlet
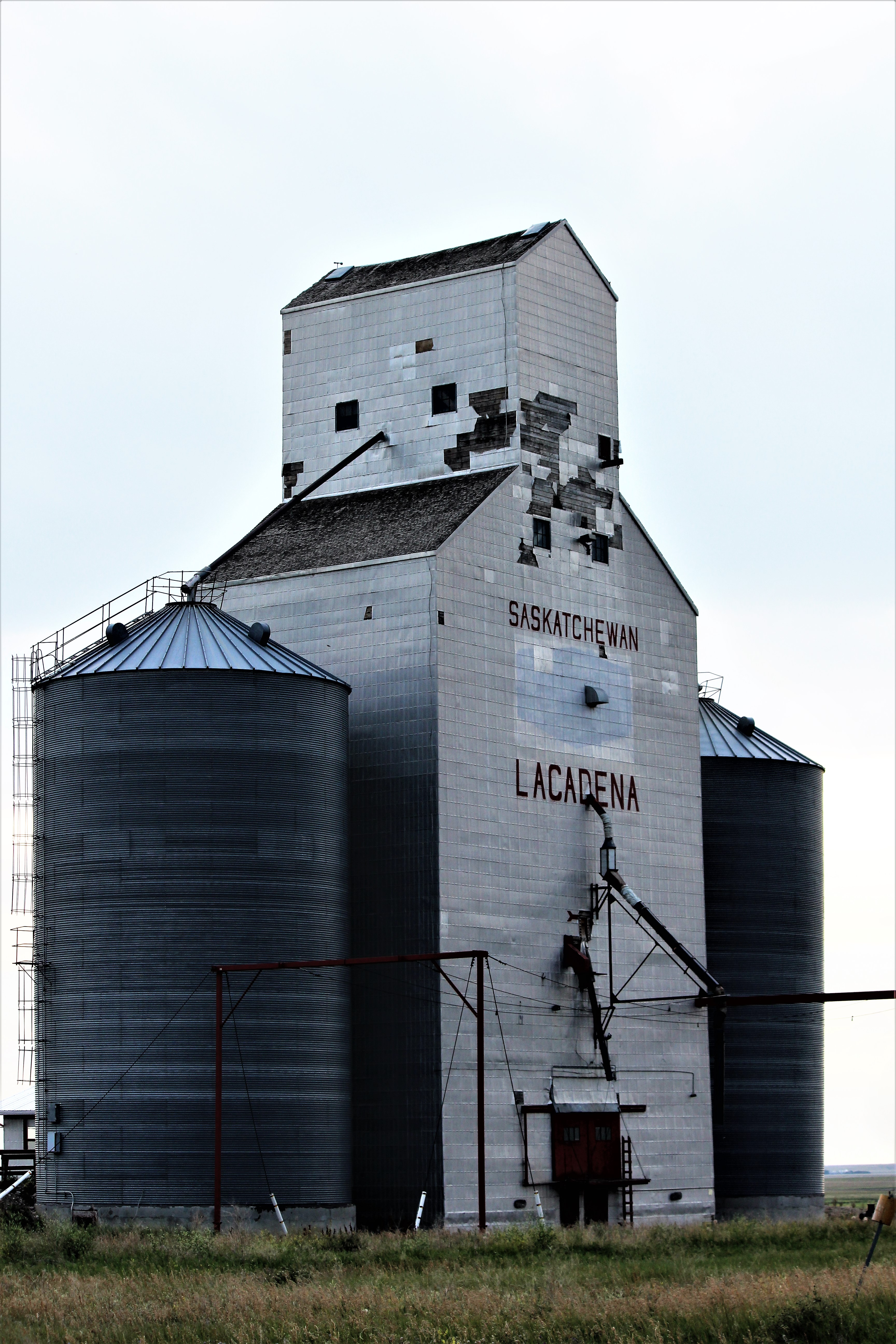
- Former Saskatchewan Wheat Pool grain elevator in Lacadena, originally from Saltburn, moved to Lacadena in 1980.
- Interactive map of Lacadena
- Coordinates: 50°57′0″N 108°20′3″W
- Country: Canada
- Province: Saskatchewan
- Rural municipality: Lacadena No. 228

Lacadena is an unincorporated community in the Rural Municipality of Lacadena No. 228, Saskatchewan, Canada. The hamlet is located approximately 106 miles (171 km) northwest of Swift Current and about 29 miles (47 km) west of Highway 4 on Highway 342.

== See also ==
- List of communities in Saskatchewan
- List of hamlets in Saskatchewan
