= Marriott, Saskatchewan =

Hamlet in Saskatchewan, Canada

Marriott is a hamlet in the Rural Municipality of Marriott No. 317, Saskatchewan, Canada. The hamlet is located south of the town of Biggar and north of the town of Rosetown on the Marriott Road off of Highway 4. Actual location is 51°45′2″N 107°55′5″W. This location is the old town site and current location of the municipality's operation.

== See also ==
- List of communities in Saskatchewan
- List of hamlets in Saskatchewan
