= Cando, Saskatchewan =

Hamlet in Saskatchewan, Canada

Coordinates: 52°23′0″N 108°14′2″W

Cando is a hamlet in the Rural Municipality of Rosemount No. 378, Saskatchewan, Canada. The hamlet is located 48 kilometres (30 mi) south of the city of North Battleford on Highway 4. It is the headquarters of the Mosquito, Grizzly Bear's Head, Lean Man First Nations of the Assiniboine people.

The community was served by Canadian National Railway's Porter Subdivision. The rail line was originally built by the Grand Trunk Pacific Railway from Oban to Battleford. The community is situated along the remains of the historic Swift Current–Battleford Trail. The portion of the line from Battleford to Cando was closed in 1974, leaving the portion to Cando from Oban. Once the elevator at Cando closed the remainder of the line was abandoned in the late 1980s.

This hamlet was named after Cando, North Dakota, the original home of Charles Alexander Coulton Edwards, the first postmaster.

== History ==
Prior to December 31, 2005, Cando was incorporated as a village, and was restructured as a hamlet under the jurisdiction of the RM of Rosemount on that date.

== Demographics ==
In the 2021 Census of Population conducted by Statistics Canada, Cando had a population of 70 living in 24 of its 32 total private dwellings, a change of 6.1% from its 2016 population of 66. With a land area of 0.64 km^{2} (0.25 sq mi), it had a population density of 109.4/km^{2} (283.3/sq mi) in 2021.

Canada census – Cando, Saskatchewan community profile

	2021
Population	70 (+6.1% from 2016)
Land area	.64 km^{2} (0.25 sq mi)
Population density	109.5/km^{2} (284/sq mi)
Median age	39.2 (M: 40.0, F: 38.4)
Private dwellings	24 (total)
Median household income

References: 2021

== See also ==
- List of communities in Saskatchewan
- List of hamlets in Saskatchewan
