= Matador Cooperative Farm =

The Matador Cooperative Farm, later known as the Matador Farming Pool, was an agricultural cooperative started on 10,000 acres of land near the town of Kyle, Saskatchewan in Canada. The land was donated by the provincial government and the cooperative was formed in 1946. The first members were a group of seventeen returning World War II veterans. Membership in the cooperative gradually declined, and the farm was sold to the Saskatchewan Land Bank Commission in 1975. Ten members leased some of the land and assets back, including the Kyle Seed Cleaning Plant and the Swift Current plant, which cleaned lentils, chick peas, and peas. The group also continued to raise wheat and cattle. In 2011, the cooperative disbanded and its assets were sold.
