= Schantzenfeld =

Locality in Saskatchewan, Canada

Coordinates: 50°06′00″N 107°46′02″W

Location of Schantzenfeld in Saskatchewan

Schantzenfeld is a hamlet in Saskatchewan, Canada. There are 2 small businesses located in Schantzenfeld. Access is from Highway 4.

== See also ==
- List of communities in Saskatchewan
