= Swift Current–Battleford Trail =

Historical trail in Saskatchewan, Canada

- Swift Current–Battleford Trail, Trail Head Swift Current–Battleford Trail (Canada)
- Established: 1883
- Location: Swift Current, Saskatchewan
- Coordinates: 50.30188°N 107.80511°W
- Type: Historic Trail

The 300-kilometre (190 mi) Swift Current–Battleford Trail was an important late-19th century transportation and communications link between settlements of Swift Current and Battleford – the result of a brisk trade, in buffalo bones which resulted heavy traffic between the two regions. Because of the large volume of Red River cart traffic, the ruts created during this period are still visible. The historical significance of this resulted in The Battleford Trail becoming a provincial heritage site in 1982.

== History ==
- First Nations era – In pre-contact times, First Nations likely used the trail's general route as a way of travelling between wintering areas to the north of Battleford and the rich summer bison hunting grounds around Swift Current.
- Métis era – The trail was used by the Métis in the earliest days when they roamed across the prairie hunting buffalo. When the railway finally arrived in Swift Current in early 1883, the entrepreneurial Métis began hauling freight and mail along the trail overland to Battleford. Prior to that, goods were hauled overland to Battleford from Winnipeg. Soon after, settlers, merchants, traders, and even government officials followed the Métis' lead and began using the trail. The route was in such demand that a stagecoach was established to transport people, freight, and mail between the two points.
- Railway era – Fort Battleford was the seat of the North-West Territories Government when the Canadian Pacific Railway arrived in Swift Current in 1883. As Swift Current was the closest railway head to Battleford, it became Battleford's primary trade and communication link to the outside world and remained so until 1891. An official survey and mapping of the trail was undertaken by R.C. Laurie in 1886.
- North-West Rebellion era – During the North-West Rebellion of 1885, Colonel William D. Otter, his troops, and around 50 North-West Mounted Police (NWMP) officers travelled the route on the march from Swift Current to Battleford to confront Louis Riel’s forces. The NWMP patrolled the trail from Swift Current to the Battlefords to ensure that military supplies arrived safely at their destination. They provided security for the 500 troops as well as the 200 civilian teamsters who were contracted to haul the supplies. Starting in 1886 the police presence in the area was reduced in numbers, however police continued patrols to provide general security, enforce laws, and assist settlers. For several years, the trail was well-trafficked with people, freight, and mail all using the route.
- Era of decline – The trail was only active for about seven years as a result of the construction of a railway between Regina and Prince Albert via Saskatoon in 1890. This made Saskatoon the closest railway to Battleford and signalled the end of the Swift Current–Battlefords Trail. The trail remained in use for local travel as late as 1925.

== Important sites on the trail ==
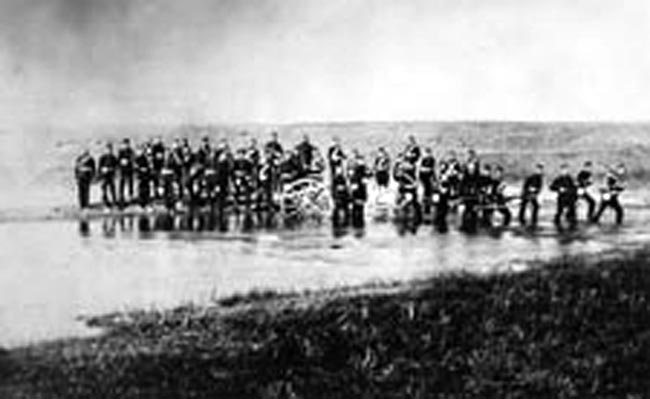
Swift Current; the beginning of the trail

Sixty Mile Bush Outpost – Sixty Mile Bush Outpost was an important rest stop on the Swift Current–Battleford Trail. It was close to the current town of Biggar on Township 34, Range 15 West of the 3rd Meridian. It was named Sixty Mile Bush as a result of being about 60 miles (97 km) south of Battleford. It served as a NWMP post and a way station for travellers and the stagecoach. Half-way houses were established about every 40 miles (64 km) along the trail to supply the stagecoaches with a fresh set of four horses. They were stocked with food and provisions for the winter months for stagecoach stopovers and a rest stop for passengers. In 1910 a few Métis were ranching in the area at which time a Catholic mission was established. Settlers began arriving in the area around 1906 and began laying claims to homesteads. The Sixty Mile Bush Outpost Monument, erected to commemorate the post reads, "This was the site of the sixty mile bush outpost. A stopping place on the Swift Current–Battleford Trail. A log house provided lodging over the trail. Two NWMP were stationed here from 1886 to 1889. The house later became a store for the settlers. A Roman Catholic Church was built at the site in 1906. The settlement disbanded about 1911 after the Grand Trunk Pacific Railroad and the town of Biggar were established."

Battleford Trail Wheel Rut Area – The Battleford Trail Wheel Rut Area is located in the city of Swift Current. It consists of a small plot of native grass prairie that contains two deep and parallel Red River cart and wagon wheel ruts. These marks in the ground are the remnants of the historic Swift Current–Battleford Trail and have been designated as a Municipal Heritage Property.

== Communities near the trail ==
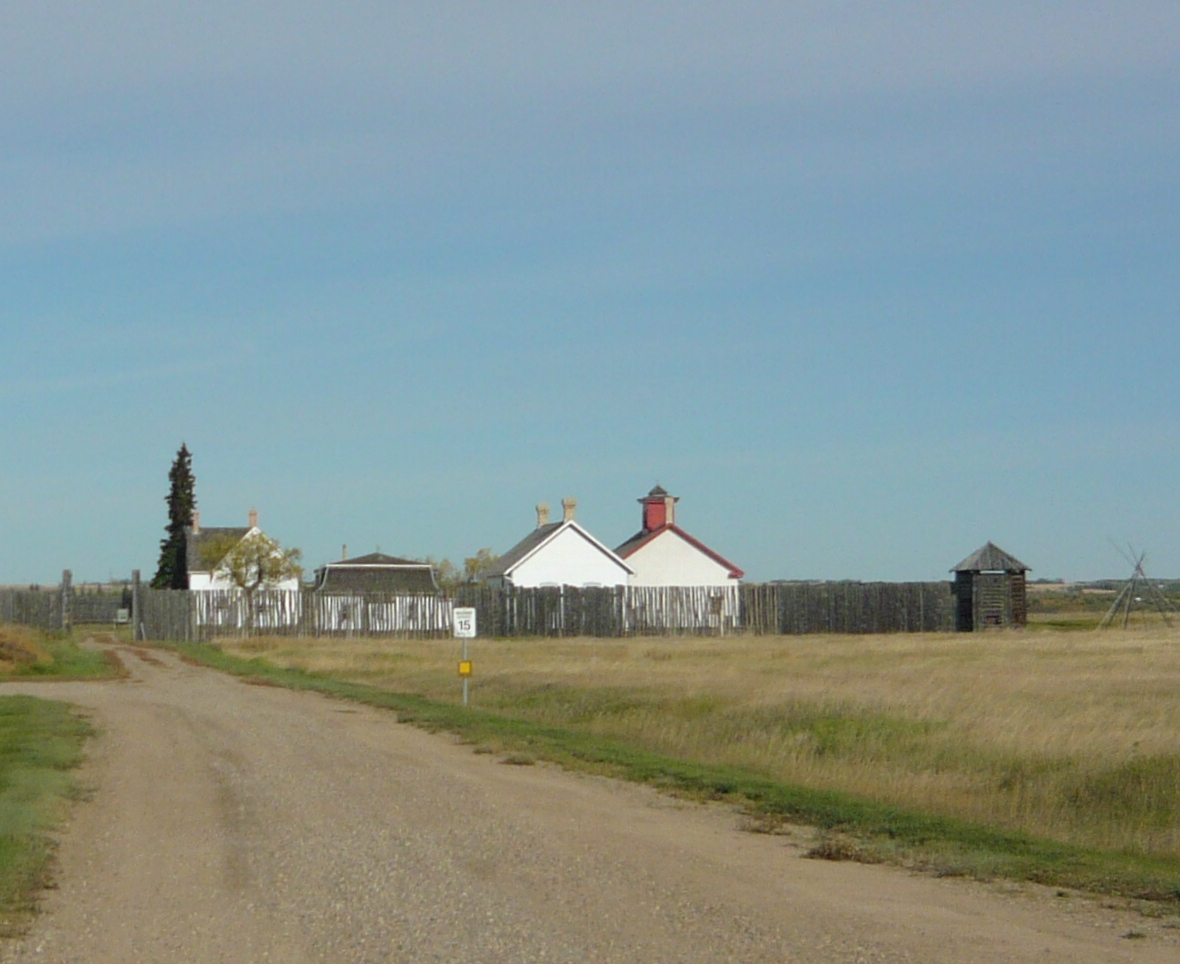
Fort Battleford; the end of the trail

Several modern communities exist on or near the original Swift Current–Battleford trail, some of them, like Swift Current and Battleford, existed at the time, while others have grown up along the trail since then.

- Swift Current
- Stewart Valley
- Saskatchewan Landing
- Kyle
- Sanctuary
- Otter Spring
- Elrose
- Rosetown
- Herschel
- Biggar
- Cando
- Mosquito First Nation
- Battleford

Today, Highway 4 runs the distance between Swift Current and Battleford providing access to the communities along the route.

== See also ==
- Transportation in Saskatchewan
