= Monchy, Saskatchewan =

Community in Saskatchewan, Canada

Monchy
- Port of Entry
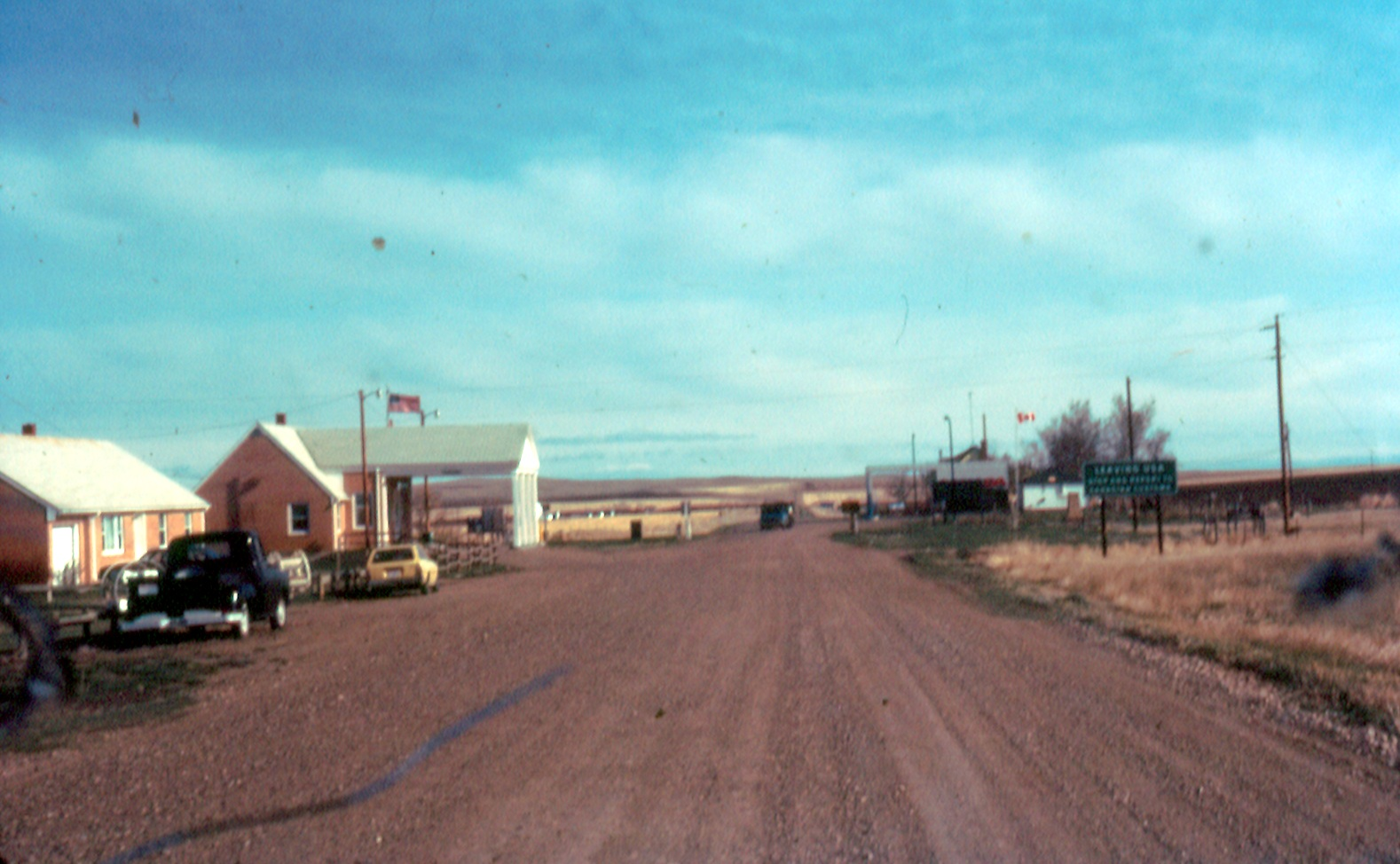
- Border crossing, 1985, looking north

- Location of Monchy Monchy (Canada)
- Coordinates: 49°01′00″N 107°50′02″W
- Country: Canada
- Province: Saskatchewan
- Rural municipality: Val Marie No. 17
- Post Office Established: 1917-08-01
- Post Office Closed: 1951-04-21
- Time zone: CST
- Area code: 306

Monchy is a former settlement in Saskatchewan, Canada, near the Canada–US border crossing of Morgan–Monchy. The crossing is the transition point between Saskatchewan Highway 4 and U.S. Route 191. Originally a small settlement, it is now primarily a border crossing. On the opposite side of the border is Morgan, Montana.

Monchy was named after Monchy-le-Preux in France in commemoration of WWI battles fought there by Canadian forces.

The border crossing is staffed by the Canada Border Services Agency during the day and closed at night. The border crossing consists of a customs building, residence and three storage buildings. Growing pressure exists on both the Canada and US side of the border to expand the border crossing to 24-hour operation.

== Notable people ==
- George Spence — Member of Provincial Legislature (1917–1925, 1927–1938) and Member of Parliament (1925–1927)

== See also ==
- List of communities in Saskatchewan
