= Clearwater Lake (Saskatchewan) =

Lake in Saskatchewan, Canada

- Location in Saskatchewan Clearwater Lake (Canada)
- Location: RM of Lacadena No. 228, Saskatchewan
- Coordinates: 50.8734°N 107.9301°W
- Part of: Saskatchewan River drainage basin
- River sources: Coteau Hills
- Basin countries: Canada
- Surface area: 58.2 ha (144 acres)
- Max. depth: 7.62 m (25.0 ft)
- Shore length^{1}: 3.7 km (2.3 mi)
- Surface elevation: 710 m (2,330 ft)
- ^{1} Shore length is not a well-defined measure.

Clearwater Lake is a lake in the south-west region of the Canadian province of Saskatchewan. It is about 12 kilometres (7.5 mi) east of Kyle in the Rural Municipality of Lacadena No. 228 and accessed from Highway 342. It is a spring-fed lake in the Coteau Hills. Much of the lake is surrounded by a regional park, golf course, and cottages. Clearwater Drive-in is located just to the west of the lake.

== Clearwater Lake Regional Park ==
Clearwater Lake Regional Park (50.8683°N 107.9285°W) is a park on the shore of Clearwater Lake. Elmer and Ann Nelson started the park as a family enterprise in 1925.

The park has a campground with 60 campsites plus a group camping area. Other accommodations include six cabins, four of which include full services. Amenities include a recreation hall for event bookings, convenience store, bar, cafe, beach, playgrounds, golf, and a tennis court.

The golf course is a 9-hole, sand greens course. It is a par 33 totalling 2,296 yards.

== See also ==
- List of lakes of Saskatchewan
- List of protected areas of Saskatchewan
- Tourism in Saskatchewan
