= Hughton, Saskatchewan =

Community in Saskatchewan, Canada

Hughton
- Ghost Town
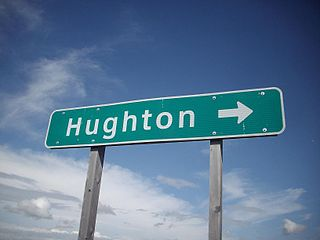

- Location within Saskatchewan Location within Canada
- Coordinates: 51°32′00″N 108°16′50″W
- Country: Canada
- Province: Saskatchewan
- Region: Southwest
- Census division: 13
- Rural municipality: Monet No. 257
- Established: 1913

Population (2011)
  - Total: 10
  - Dwellings: 2
- Time zone: CST
- Postal code: S0K
- Area code: 306
- Highways: Highway 44

Hughton is a hamlet in the Rural Municipality of Monet No. 257, Saskatchewan, Canada. The hamlet is located at along Highway 44 approximately 158 kilometres (98 mi) southwest of the city of Saskatoon.

== History ==
The first settlers arrived in the area around 1907. The settlement of the region was eventually sped up by the construction of the Canadian Northern Railway in 1913. The first school in the district of Hughton was built 6 miles east, while around 1910 a second school was built nearer to the future town site, about 1 mile southeast. A post office was opened on the homestead of John G.Ritchie in July 1911 and named Stoford. The Office was moved to the town site by F.A.Cameron in April 1914.

After the CNOR's arrival in 1913 a town site was hurriedly settled and quickly counted an assortment of businesses ranging from a three-story hotel, the station, a Union Bank, stores, elevators, the restaurant, a lumber yard, a butcher, a blacksmith and a barber shop/poolroom to name a few. By 1916 there was a curling rink and skating rink, baseball field and later still a hall and tennis court.

Incorporated as a village from its initial conception in 1913, the population of Hughton grew from 80 residents in 1916 to 111 in 1926. According to Wrigley's community directory of Saskatchewan in 1922 the place contained no less than 27 business, while 6 elevators competed heavily for the regions grain production. Although the business district was hard hit by the depression of the 1930s Hughton continued to grow. The school built in 1916 had grown to three rooms and contained 100 pupils from every grade (High School included).

By 1941, higher grain prices brought on by the Second World War and a return to better harvest, Hughton swelled to 141 residents. Though only a dozen businesses remained the community bounced back from the dreary depression years. A highway was completed to town in 1945. A new larger hall was completed in 1949 as well as a new curling rink and several other improvements such as concrete sidewalks.

By the turn of the 1950s, a downturn was evident and by 1961 there were only 86 residents. Hughton was finished as many left the community for larger centres. By 1966, there were less than 40 people and the village was dissolved. In 1976, there was only a single store left, it soon closed as did the post office that year. In the 1980s, only a few homes, hall/curling rink and elevators were left. Today, even those have mostly disappeared. The elevators have all vanished, two families remain as do the hall and the curling rink. Two abandoned homes, a garage and a shack are the remains of Hughton's remaining vestiges as are many empty streets.

== Name ==
The hamlet was originally named Stoford, probably after a village of that name in Somerset, England. In 1913, the name was changed to its current name, which is a portmanteau of Hugh and Milton Winters, sons of O. O. Winters, the first village overseer.

== Gallery ==
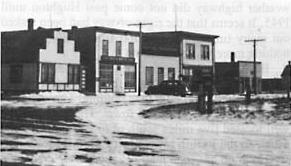
Main Street in Hughton 1940s

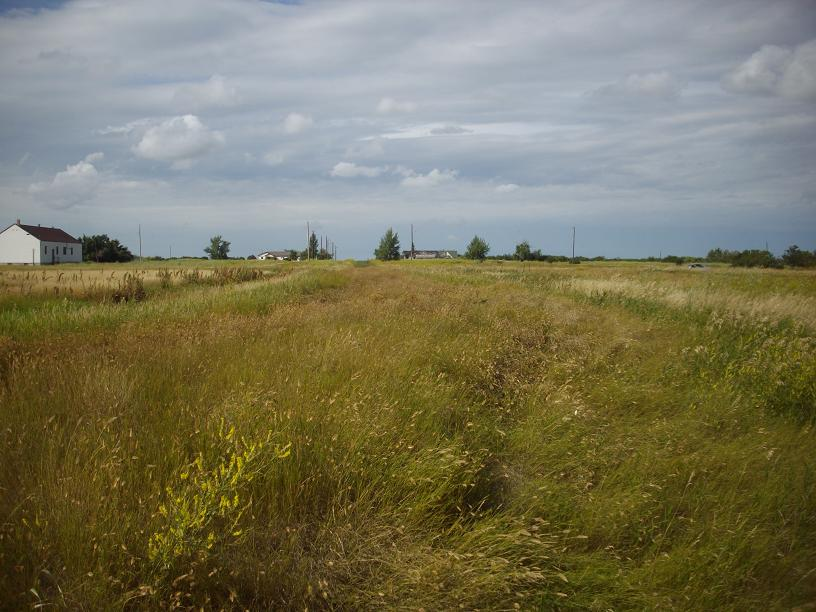
Hughton From the CNR line

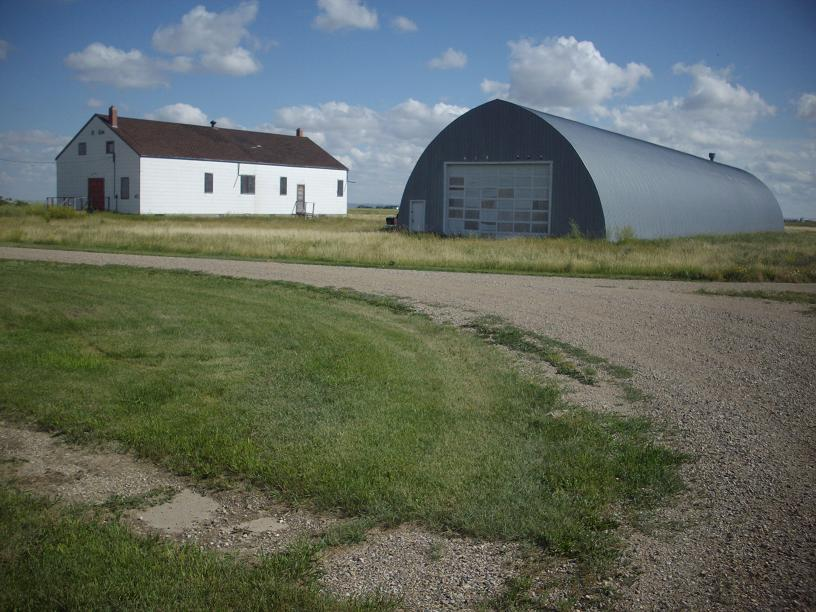
Hughton Hall and Curling Rink

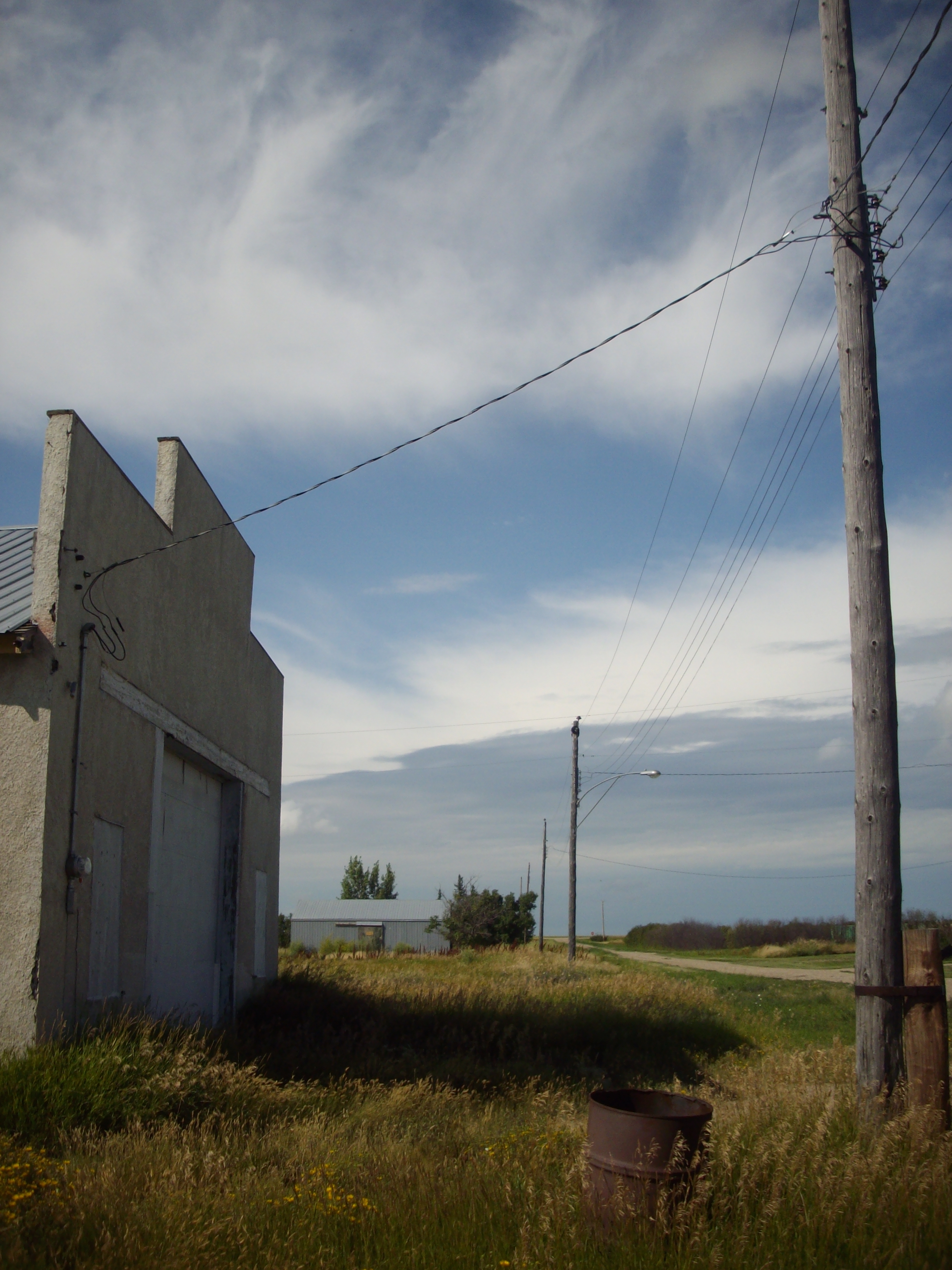
Quiet Streets of Hughton

== See also ==
- List of communities in Saskatchewan
- List of hamlets in Saskatchewan
- List of geographic names derived from portmanteaus
