= Chipperfield, Saskatchewan =

Community in Saskatchewan, Canada

Chipperfield
- Hamlet
- Location within Saskatchewan Location within Canada
- Coordinates: 51.2833828°N 108.2506970°W
- Country: Canada
- Province: Saskatchewan
- Region: Southwest
- Census division: 8
- Rural municipality: Monet No. 257

Government
  - Governing body: Monet No. 257

Population (2006)
  - Total: 0
- Time zone: CST
- Area code: 306
- Highways: Highway 752
- Railways: Canadian Pacific Railway - Abandoned

Chipperfield is a hamlet in the Rural Municipality of Monet No. 257, Saskatchewan, Canada. The hamlet is located at the junction of Highway 752 and Range road 170 approximately 50 kilometres (31 mi) south-west of Rosetown, only 170 kilometres (110 mi) south-west of Saskatoon.

== See also ==
- List of communities in Saskatchewan
- List of hamlets in Saskatchewan
