= White Bear, Saskatchewan =

White Bear
- Unincorporated community
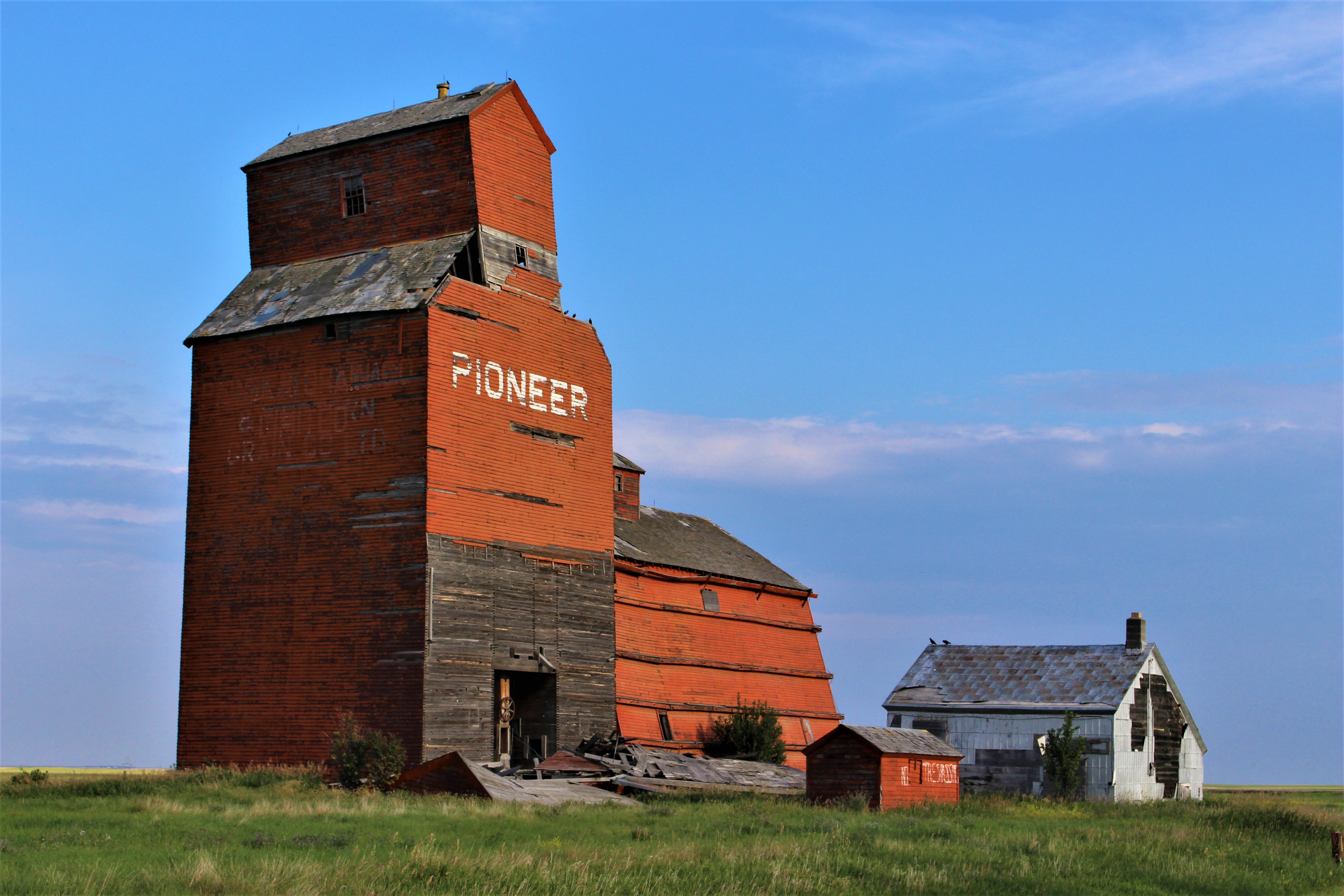
- The long abandoned Pioneer Grain Co. elevator, an icon that stood in White Bear, until it was destroyed by lightning in 2017.

- Location within Saskatchewan
- Coordinates: 50°52′51″N 108°13′07″W
- Country: Canada
- Province: Saskatchewan
- Region: Southwest
- Census division: 8
- Rural municipality: Lacadena No. 228

Population (2006)
  - Total: 13
  - Density: 8.8/km^{2} (23/sq mi)
- Time zone: CST
- Area code: 306
- Highways: Highway 342
- Waterways: South Saskatchewan River

White Bear is an unincorporated community in the Rural Municipality of Lacadena No. 228, Saskatchewan, Canada. Listed as a designated place by Statistics Canada, the hamlet had a population of 15 in the Canada 2006 Census. The community is approximately 55 mi (89 km) northwest of Swift Current on the north side of the South Saskatchewan River.

== Demographics ==
In the 2021 Census of Population conducted by Statistics Canada, White Bear had a population of 25 living in 10 of its 13 total private dwellings, a change of 150% from its 2016 population of 10. With a land area of 0.24 km^{2} (0.093 sq mi), it had a population density of 104.2/km^{2} (269.8/sq mi) in 2021.

Canada census – White Bear, Saskatchewan community profile

	2016
Population	10 (- 37.5% from 2011)
Land area	0.24 km^{2} (0.093 sq mi)
Population density	41.6/km^{2} (108/sq mi)
Median age	N/A (M: , F: )
Private dwellings	11 (total)
Median household income

References: 2016

== History ==
The community's name comes from the sighting of a probable but now extirpated white prairie grizzly bear by an Assiniboine warrior on the shores of a neighbouring lake during the Palliser Expedition of the 1850s. Records from early Metis settlers and the North-West Mounted Police state the last roaming herd of American buffalo being slaughtered in the hills of the Missouri Coteau located 25 miles (40 km) northeast around 1879.

During the 1930s, White Bear was a bustling community of approximately 250 residents with two grocery stores, a school, four grain elevators and three garages servicing an area of 200 families, but has since dwindled to a population of 15 in 2006. Part of the decline is attributed to federal policy Canadian National Railway rail line in that area of Saskatchewan. The region rarely suffered poor crops, except during the droughts of the Great Depression and 1988. It is connected to the rest of the province through Highway 342, a now-decrepit road featuring signs with Imperial units in portions. Farmers from the area played prominently in the socialism that later defined Saskatchewan and then Canada through the introduction of Medicare and state-ran insurance. The White Bear Hotel remains the only business in operation.

== See also ==
- List of communities in Saskatchewan
