= Morgan–Monchy Border Crossing =

Border crossing between Canada and the US

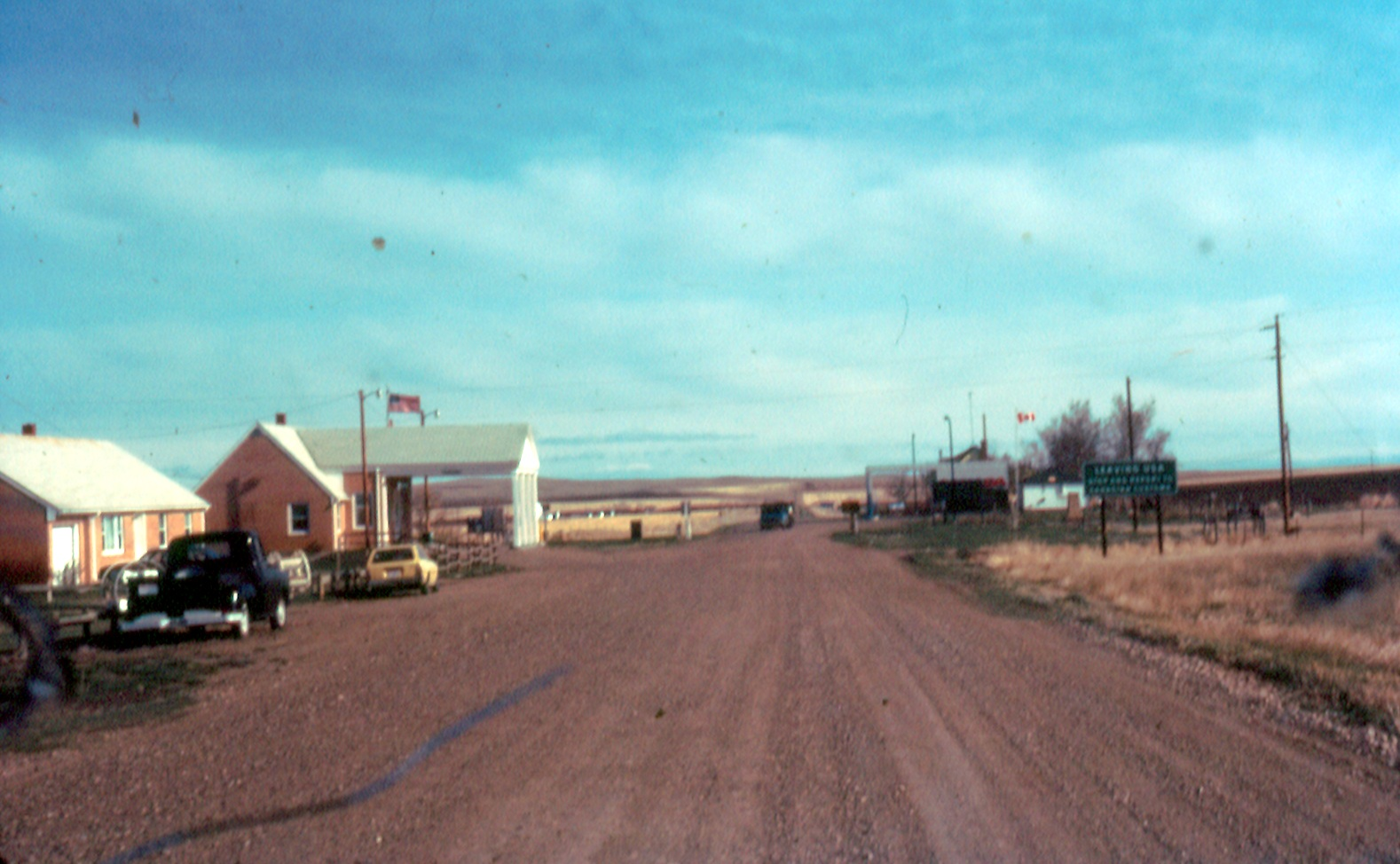
- US Border Inspection Station at Morgan, Montana, as seen in 1985. This building was replaced in 2011.

Location
- Country: United States; Canada
- Location: US 191 / Highway 4; US Port: 53869 US Highway 191, Loring, MT 59537-9600; Canadian Port: Highway 4, Monchy, Saskatchewan S0N 1V0
- Coordinates: 48.999785°N 107.831863°W

Details
- Opened: 1935

Website
- https://www.cbp.gov/contact/ports/morgan-mt

The Morgan–Monchy Border Crossing connects the town of Loring, Montana with Val Marie, Saskatchewan on the Canada–US border. It is reached by U.S. Route 191 on the American side and Saskatchewan Highway 4 on the Canadian side. These roadways were not paved near the border until the late 1980s. This crossing is where the proposed Keystone Pipeline was to cross the border.

In 2011, the US replaced its border inspection facilities, which were originally built in 1963. Canada replaced its inspection facilities, which were built in 1973, in 2015.

== See also ==
- List of Canada–United States border crossings
