= Wartime, Saskatchewan =

Wartime
- Unincorporated community
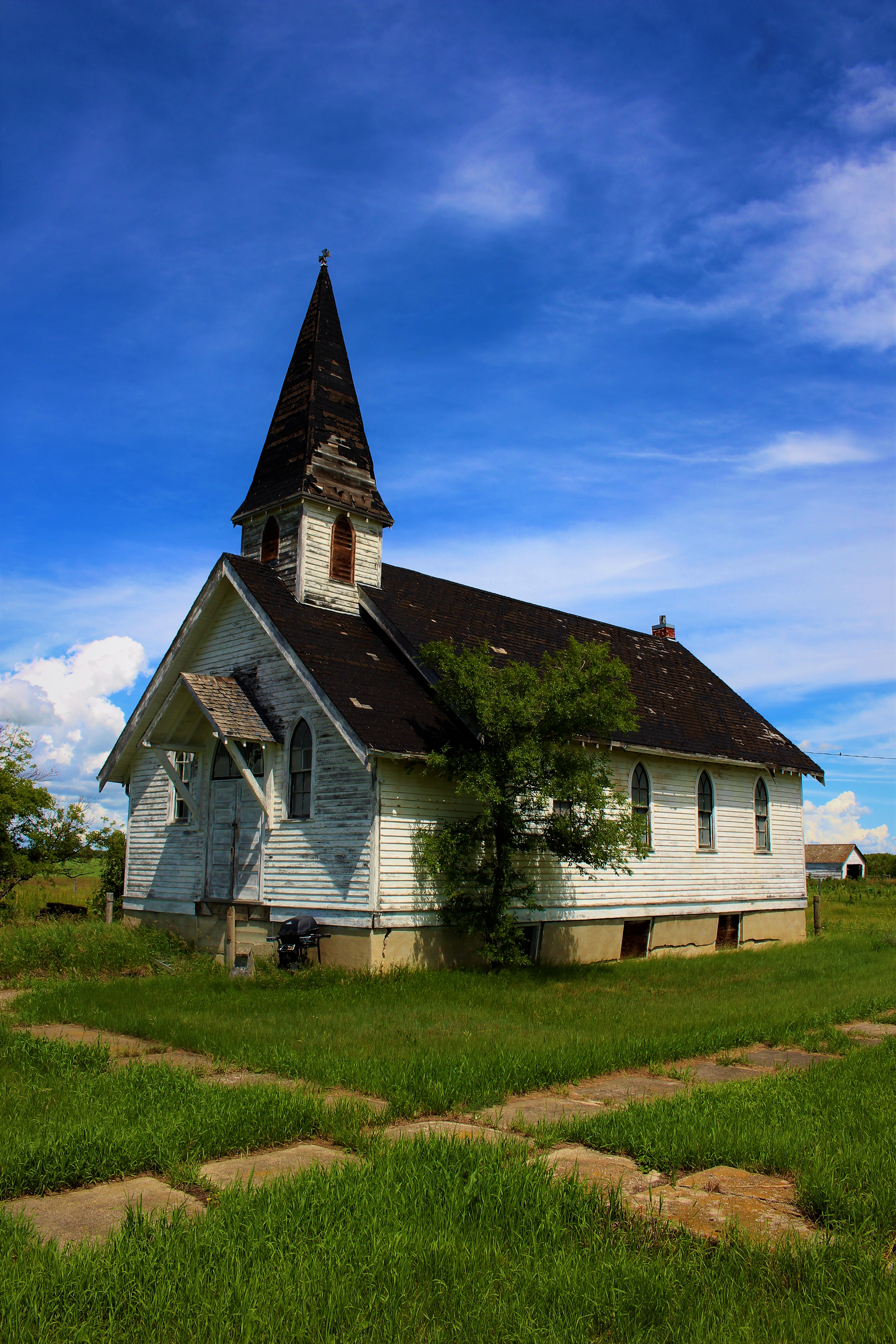
- Old church in Wartime

- Location within Saskatchewan Location within Canada
- Coordinates: 51.1250°N 108.1130°W
- Country: Canada
- Province: Saskatchewan
- Region: Southwest
- Census division: 8
- Rural Municipality: Monet No. 257

Government
  - Type: Municipal
  - Governing body: Rural Municipality of Monet
- Time zone: UTC-6 (CST)
- Area code: 306
- Highways: Highway 44
- Railways: Canadian Pacific Railway

Wartime is an unincorporated community and former hamlet, within the Rural Municipality of Monet No. 257, Saskatchewan, Canada. The community is located along Highway 44 approximately 13 km west of Elrose along Canadian National Railway's Elrose sub-division track. The community once boasted a train station built in 1914 which was demolished in 1978, two grain elevators; a Saskatchewan Wheat Pool and a Federal elevator as well as a wooden water tank. The elevators have disappeared but the water tower is still standing and in use.

== Etymology ==
Settlers began arriving in the area around 1909 and by the fall of 1913 construction of the CN railway had reached as far as nearby Elrose, Saskatchewan. Preparations for the railroad bed had made it as far as Wartime by 1914 and resulted in a few buildings being built. The outbreak of the First World War occurred at this time so the town was named Wartime. The rails were laid in 1915 and the post office opened that same year and operated until 1990. In 1923, the Canadian Pacific Railway extended a line from Rosetown to Kyle, passing through Wartime.

Wooden water tower in Wartime, Saskatchewan. Built in 1912 to supply water to locomotives.

== Notable people ==
William Hunter "Bill" McKnight, SOM PC (born July 12, 1940 - October 4, 2019) was born in Wartime, Saskatchewan. He served as Minister of Agriculture, Minister of Indian Affairs and Northern Development, Minister of National Defence during the first Gulf War, Minister of Energy, Mines and Resources and Minister of Labour in the Progressive Conservative government of Brian Mulroney.

== See also ==
- List of communities in Saskatchewan
