= Beechy =

Village in Saskatchewan, Canada

- Village
- Village of Beechy
- Location of Beechy in Saskatchewan Beechy (Canada)
- Coordinates: 50.9°N 107.4°W
- Country: Canada
- Province: Saskatchewan
- Region: Southwest
- Census division: 7
- Rural Municipality: Victory
- Post office Founded: 1908
- Incorporated (Village): 1925

Government
  - Type: Municipal
  - Governing body: Beechy Village Council

Population (2021)
  - Total: 209
- Time zone: CST
- Postal code: S0L 0C0
- Area code: 306
- Website: Village of Beechy website

Beechy (2021 population: 209) is a village in the Canadian province of Saskatchewan within the Rural Municipality of Victory No. 226 and Census Division No. 7. The village is located in the Coteau Hills region of the province, at the intersection of Highway 342 and Highway 737. As of 2021, the village's population is 209 (down from the 2001 population of 295).

== History ==
The Beechy area was first settled by ranchers early in the 20th century, with Robert Cruikshank acknowledged as the first settler in the area. Starting in the 1910s, the large-scale immigration of Europeans to the Canadian prairies resulted in an increase in population for Beechy as well, attracting settlers who started ranching and farming in the area, which remains Beechy's primary activity today.

In 1919 the Canadian National Railway surveyed the Beechy area and determined it to be an ideal place for a marketplace. Work on the railroad was begun; news of the future railroad stop attracted merchants. The train first arrived on December 21, 1921.

The growth in population brought other much-needed services to this rural community, the first grain elevator was constructed in 1922. Beechy incorporated as a village on May 11, 1925.

== Climate ==
Climate data for Beechy, 1981–2010 normals, extremes 1926–present
Month	Jan	Feb	Mar	Apr	May	Jun	Jul	Aug	Sep	Oct	Nov	Dec	Year
Record high °C (°F)	12.8 (55.0)	15.0 (59.0)	24.0 (75.2)	34.4 (93.9)	36.5 (97.7)	41.1 (106.0)	42.8 (109.0)	39.5 (103.1)	37.8 (100.0)	32.8 (91.0)	25.5 (77.9)	17.2 (63.0)	42.8 (109.0)
Mean daily maximum °C (°F)	−7.0 (19.4)	−4.1 (24.6)	2.5 (36.5)	12.3 (54.1)	18.5 (65.3)	22.8 (73.0)	26.4 (79.5)	25.9 (78.6)	19.4 (66.9)	11.6 (52.9)	1.1 (34.0)	−5.1 (22.8)	10.4 (50.7)
Daily mean °C (°F)	−12.1 (10.2)	−9.2 (15.4)	−2.8 (27.0)	5.5 (41.9)	11.5 (52.7)	16.2 (61.2)	19.1 (66.4)	18.4 (65.1)	12.4 (54.3)	5.3 (41.5)	−3.8 (25.2)	−10.2 (13.6)	4.2 (39.6)
Mean daily minimum °C (°F)	−17.1 (1.2)	−14.3 (6.3)	−8.0 (17.6)	−1.3 (29.7)	4.4 (39.9)	9.5 (49.1)	11.8 (53.2)	10.9 (51.6)	5.3 (41.5)	−1.1 (30.0)	−8.6 (16.5)	−15.2 (4.6)	−2.0 (28.4)
Record low °C (°F)	−46.7 (−52.1)	−48.3 (−54.9)	−41.1 (−42.0)	−26.7 (−16.1)	−14.5 (5.9)	−4.4 (24.1)	0.0 (32.0)	−3.3 (26.1)	−17.8 (0.0)	−26.1 (−15.0)	−33.5 (−28.3)	−41.1 (−42.0)	−48.3 (−54.9)
Average precipitation mm (inches)	14.7 (0.58)	8.5 (0.33)	16.6 (0.65)	17.5 (0.69)	46.2 (1.82)	73.4 (2.89)	61.5 (2.42)	40.6 (1.60)	33.8 (1.33)	18.2 (0.72)	13.3 (0.52)	14.1 (0.56)	358.4 (14.11)
Source: Environment Canada

== Demographics ==
Population history (1981–2016)
Year	Pop.	±%
1981	279	—
1986	299	+7.2%
1991	298	−0.3%
1996	281	−5.7%
2001	295	+5.0%
2006	243	−17.6%
2011	239	−1.6%
2016	228	−4.6%
Source: Statistics Canada via Saskatchewan Bureau of Statistics

In the 2021 Census of Population conducted by Statistics Canada, Beechy had a population of 209 living in 103 of its 112 total private dwellings, a change of −8.3% from its 2016 population of 228. With a land area of 1.09 km^{2} (0.42 sq mi), it had a population density of 191.7/km^{2} (496.6/sq mi) in 2021.

In the 2016 Census of Population, the Village of Beechy recorded a population of 228 living in 116 of its 147 total private dwellings, a −4.8% change from its 2011 population of 239. With a land area of 1.06 km^{2} (0.41 sq mi), it had a population density of 215.1/km^{2} (557.1/sq mi) in 2016.

== Recreation ==
One of the first baseball teams in the area was formed in Beechy in 1911. Baseball is still played in the village today by the Beechy Breakers.

Beechy's first organized hockey team played during the winter of 1935–1936. After World War II, those Beechy residents who served overseas, which included the entire hockey team, returned to Beechy and created the Beechy Bombers hockey team. The first skating rink was built in 1952.

The first agricultural fair was held in the area in 1922. The agricultural society was organized in 1936 and granted its charter in 1945. The first racetrack was built in 1948, and the following year the first harness races were held.

The community hall was built in 2000, replacing the much older Legion Hall which was demolished and replaced with a monument.

The biggest event in Beechy is the Beechy Western Days rodeo, first held in 1968.

== Sand Castles and Sunken Hill ==
The Sand Castles and Sunken Hill formations are 7.2 kilometres (4.5 mi) south-west of Beechy, north of Lake Diefenbaker. The scenic giant Sand Castles were formed due to many years of wind and rain erosion. The Sunken Hill was formed from the sudden collapse of a subterranean natural gas pocket. The formations, which are on private land, were closed to the public in 2019 due to "increasing visitation and associated risks".

== Healthcare ==
Originally, Beechy's health services consisted of just one medical practitioner, and the "hospital" was based out of a private residence, with extra rooms built on for wards. This hospital was used until 1966, when the Beechy Union Hospital was opened. In 1991, the Beechy Union Hospital was closed by the provincial government and the building now serves as a clinic.

== Notable residents ==
- Elwin Hermanson — politician; represented Beechy on the federal level as the Member of Parliament for Kindersley—Lloydminster; Reform Party House Leader; then represented the area provincially, becoming the first leader of the Saskatchewan Party and Leader of the Opposition until 2003 when he relinquished the leadership
- Herbert J. Swan — politician; former Speaker of the Legislative Assembly of Saskatchewan

== See also ==
- List of communities in Saskatchewan
- List of villages in Saskatchewan
