= Leinan =

Community in Saskatchewan, Canada

Coordinates: 50.493°N 107.769°W

Leinan is a locality in the Rural Municipality of Saskatchewan Landing No. 167 in the Canadian province of Saskatchewan. It is located east of Highway 4 on Highway 736 (Leinan Road), approximately 24 kilometres (15 mi) north of Swift Current.

== See also ==
- List of communities in Saskatchewan
- List of ghost towns in Saskatchewan
