= Sanctuary, Saskatchewan =

Community in Saskatchewan, Canada

Coordinates: 50.993°N 108.076°W

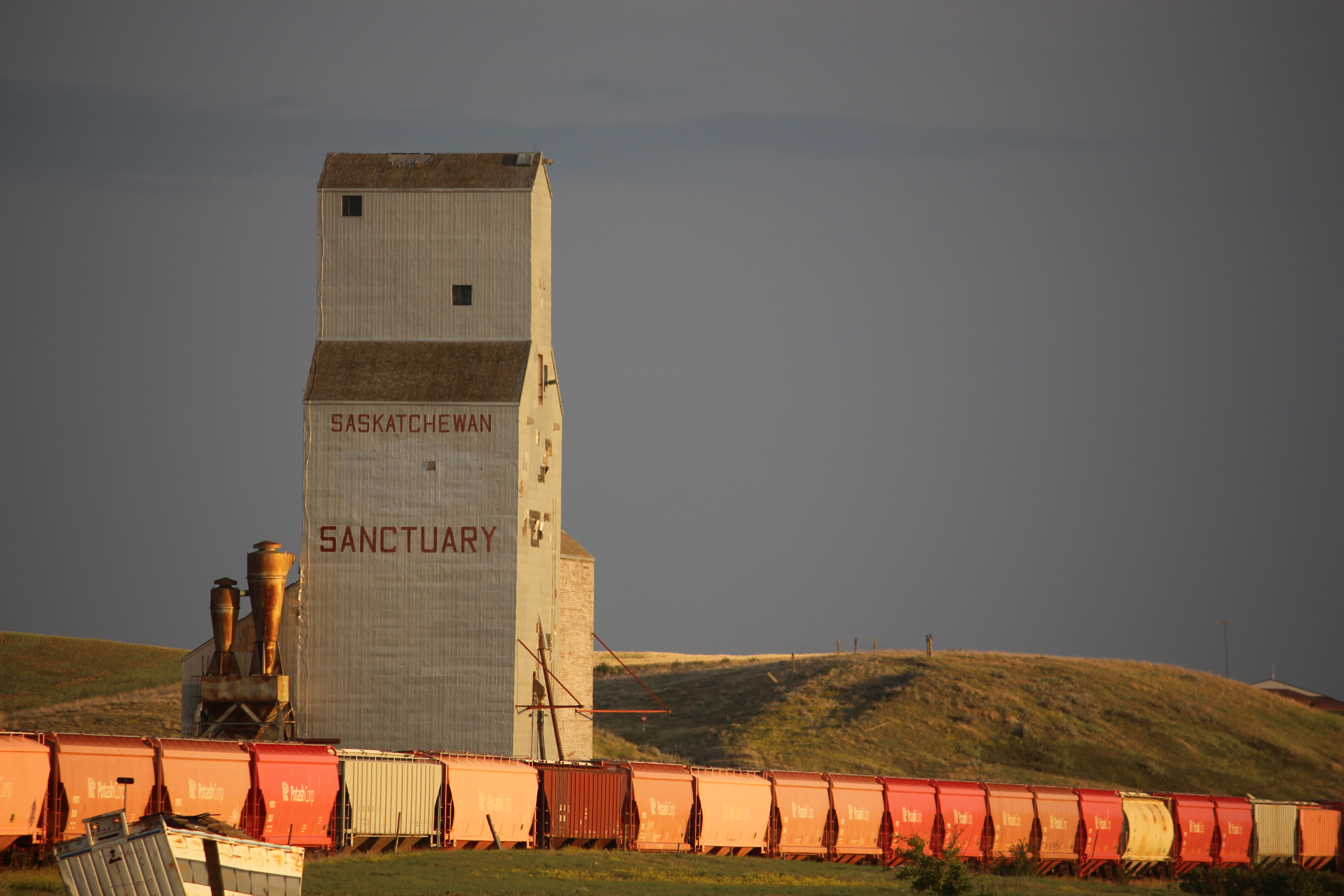
Former Saskatchewan Wheat Pool grain elevator in Sanctuary

Sanctuary is an unincorporated community in the Canadian province of Saskatchewan, located in the Rural Municipality of Lacadena No. 228. The hamlet is located approximately 7.2 kilometres (4.5 mi) west of Highway 4 on Highway 647, about 93 kilometres (58 mi) north of Swift Current and is situated along the remains of the historic Swift Current–Battleford Trail.

== See also ==
- List of communities in Saskatchewan
