= Rural Municipality of Saskatchewan Landing No. 167 =

Rural municipality in Saskatchewan, Canada

Saskatchewan Landing No. 167
- Rural municipality
- Rural Municipality of Saskatchewan Landing No. 167

- Location of the RM of Saskatchewan Landing No. 167 in Saskatchewan
- Coordinates: 50.640°N 107.902°W
- Country: Canada
- Province: Saskatchewan
- Census division: 8
- SARM division: 3
- Formed: January 1, 1913

Government
  - Reeve: Darwin Johnsgaard
  - Governing body: RM of Saskatchewan Landing No. 167 Council
  - Administrator: Kayla Powell
  - Office location: Stewart Valley

Area (2016)
  - Land: 797.52 km^{2} (307.92 sq mi)

Population (2016)
  - Total: 415
  - Density: 0.5/km^{2} (1.3/sq mi)
- Time zone: CST
  - Summer (DST): CST
- Area codes: 306 and 639

The Rural Municipality of Saskatchewan Landing No. 167 (2016 population: 415) is a rural municipality (RM) in the Canadian province of Saskatchewan within Census Division No. 8 and SARM Division No. 3.

== History ==
The RM of Saskatchewan Landing No. 167 incorporated as a rural municipality on January 1, 1913.

== Geography ==
=== Communities and localities ===
The following urban municipalities are surrounded by the RM.

Villages

- Stewart Valley

The following unincorporated communities are within the RM.

Localities

- Leinan

== Demographics ==
Population history (1981–2016)
Year	Pop.	±%
1981	579	—
1986	551	−4.8%
1991	509	−7.6%
1996	529	+3.9%
2001	506	−4.3%
2006	480	−5.1%
2011	462	−3.7%
2016	415	−10.2%
Source: Statistics Canada via Saskatchewan Bureau of Statistics

In the 2021 Census of Population conducted by Statistics Canada, the RM of Saskatchewan Landing No. 167 had a population of 434 living in 142 of its 163 total private dwellings, a change of 4.6% from its 2016 population of 415. With a land area of 792.73 km^{2} (306.07 sq mi), it had a population density of 0.5/km^{2} (1.4/sq mi) in 2021.

In the 2016 Census of Population, the RM of Saskatchewan Landing No. 167 recorded a population of 415 living in 137 of its 149 total private dwellings, a −10.2% change from its 2011 population of 462. With a land area of 797.52 km^{2} (307.92 sq mi), it had a population density of 0.5/km^{2} (1.3/sq mi) in 2016.

== Economy ==
Agriculture is the major industry in the RM.

== Attractions ==
The Saskatchewan Landing Provincial Park is located within the RM.

== Government ==
The RM of Saskatchewan Landing No. 167 is governed by an elected municipal council and an appointed administrator that meets on the third Monday of every month. The reeve of the RM is Darwin Johnsgaard while its administrator is Kayla Powell. The RM's office is located in Stewart Valley.

== See also ==
- List of rural municipalities in Saskatchewan
