= Stewart Valley =

Community in Saskatchewan, Canada

Coordinates: 50°35′44″N 107°48′19″W

Location of Stewart Valley in Saskatchewan

Stewart Valley (2016 population: 91) is a special service area in the Canadian province of Saskatchewan within the Rural Municipality of Saskatchewan Landing No. 167 and Census Division No. 8. Formerly a village, it is on Highway 4, just south of the South Saskatchewan River at its intersection with Highway 738, approximately 35 kilometres (22 mi) north of the city of Swift Current. It is along the remains of the historic Swift Current–Battleford Trail.

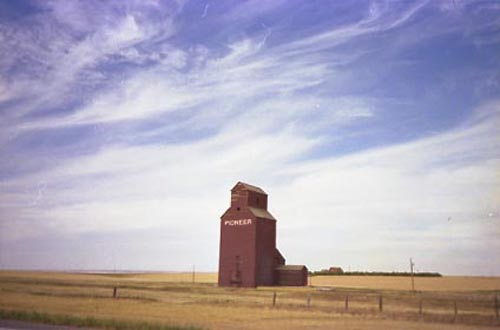
Stewart Valley

== History ==
Stewart Valley incorporated as a village on January 1, 1958. It dissolved to become a special service area in the Rural Municipality of Saskatchewan Landing No. 167 on July 1, 2023.

== Demographics ==
Population history (1981–2016)
Year	Pop.	±%
1981	133	—
1986	128	−3.8%
1991	115	−10.2%
1996	101	−12.2%
2001	101	+0.0%
2006	100	−1.0%
2011	76	−24.0%
2016	91	+19.7%
Source: Statistics Canada via Saskatchewan Bureau of Statistics

In the 2021 Census of Population conducted by Statistics Canada, Stewart Valley had a population of 107 living in 46 of its 53 total private dwellings, a change of 17.6% from its 2016 population of 91. With a land area of 0.86 km^{2} (0.33 sq mi), it had a population density of 124.4/km^{2} (322.2/sq mi) in 2021.

In the 2016 Census of Population, the Village of Stewart Valley recorded a population of 91 living in 42 of its 54 total private dwellings, a 16.5% change from its 2011 population of 76. With a land area of 0.86 km^{2} (0.33 sq mi), it had a population density of 105.8/km^{2} (274.1/sq mi) in 2016.

== Climate ==
Climate data for Stewart Valley (1981-2010)
Month	Jan	Feb	Mar	Apr	May	Jun	Jul	Aug	Sep	Oct	Nov	Dec	Year
Record high °C (°F)	12.0 (53.6)	17.0 (62.6)	22.5 (72.5)	31.0 (87.8)	37.5 (99.5)	39.5 (103.1)	38.0 (100.4)	39.0 (102.2)	36.5 (97.7)	28.5 (83.3)	26.0 (78.8)	14.0 (57.2)	39.5 (103.1)
Mean daily maximum °C (°F)	−6.2 (20.8)	−3.5 (25.7)	3.3 (37.9)	12.5 (54.5)	18.8 (65.8)	22.6 (72.7)	26.1 (79.0)	25.3 (77.5)	19.5 (67.1)	11.9 (53.4)	1.4 (34.5)	−4.0 (24.8)	10.6 (51.1)
Daily mean °C (°F)	−11.3 (11.7)	−8.9 (16.0)	−2.2 (28.0)	5.8 (42.4)	11.7 (53.1)	16.1 (61.0)	19.0 (66.2)	18.0 (64.4)	12.5 (54.5)	5.5 (41.9)	−3.6 (25.5)	−9.2 (15.4)	4.5 (40.1)
Mean daily minimum °C (°F)	−16.3 (2.7)	−14.2 (6.4)	−7.7 (18.1)	−1.0 (30.2)	4.7 (40.5)	9.6 (49.3)	11.9 (53.4)	10.7 (51.3)	5.5 (41.9)	−0.9 (30.4)	−8.7 (16.3)	−14.3 (6.3)	−1.7 (28.9)
Record low °C (°F)	−39.0 (−38.2)	−41.0 (−41.8)	−34.0 (−29.2)	−20.0 (−4.0)	−10.0 (14.0)	−1.5 (29.3)	2.0 (35.6)	−1.0 (30.2)	−8.0 (17.6)	−25.5 (−13.9)	−35.0 (−31.0)	−40.0 (−40.0)	−41.0 (−41.8)
Average precipitation mm (inches)	18.3 (0.72)	9.7 (0.38)	18.5 (0.73)	19.2 (0.76)	51.9 (2.04)	80.9 (3.19)	60.9 (2.40)	48.0 (1.89)	34.7 (1.37)	18.6 (0.73)	17.4 (0.69)	19.1 (0.75)	397.1 (15.63)
Source: Environment Canada

== Notable people ==
- Travis Moen ice hockey player in the National Hockey League.

== Notable events ==
In late August of 2022, the school and community centre in Stewart Valley burned down after being struck by lightning.

== See also ==
- List of communities in Saskatchewan
