= Elrose, Saskatchewan =

Town in Saskatchewan, Canada

Elrose
- Town
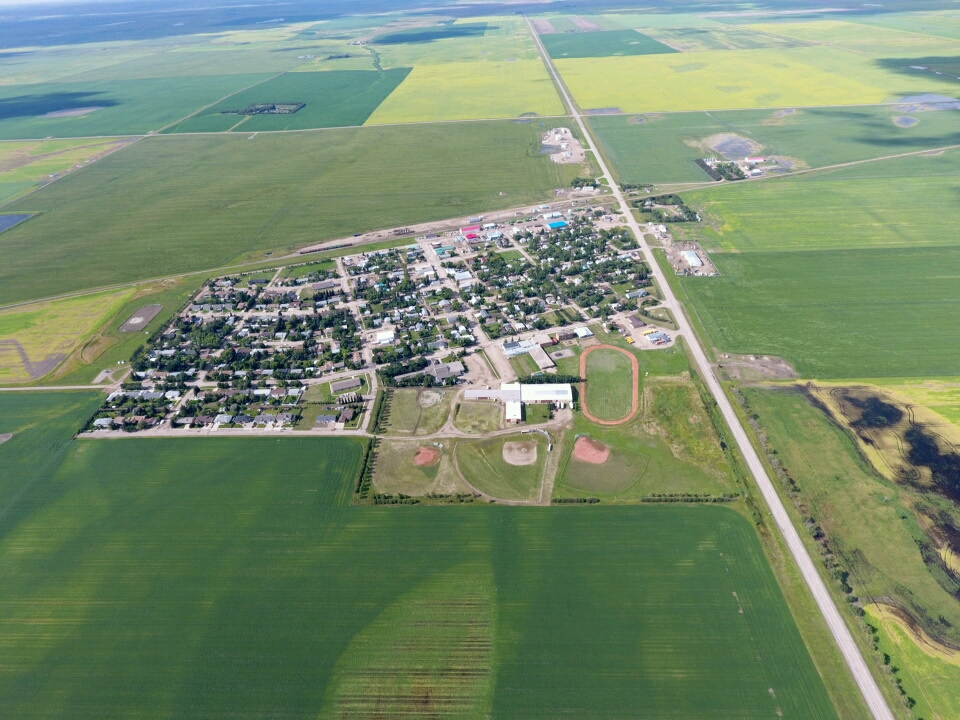

- Location within Monet No. 257 Location within Saskatchewan
- Coordinates: 51°12′1″N 108°02′0″W
- Country: Canada
- Province: Saskatchewan
- Rural municipality: Monet No. 257
- Settled: 1909–1913
- Incorporated (Village): 1914
- Incorporated (Town): 1951

Government
  - Mayor: Allen MacDonald
  - Administrator: Amber Smith
  - Governing body: Elrose Town Council
  - MLA: Jim Reiter
  - MP: Jeremy Patzer

Area
  - Land: 2.76 km^{2} (1.07 sq mi)
- Elevation: 624 m (2,047 ft)

Population (2021)
  - Total: 470
  - Density: 162.6/km^{2} (421/sq mi)
- Time zone: UTC-6 (CST)
- Postal code: S0L 0Z0
- Area code: 306
- Website: Official website

Elrose is a town located just to the north of the Coteau Hills. It is south of Rosetown and north of Swift Current on Highway 4 and Highway 44. Settled in 1913, it is a community in the middle of an agricultural economy, Elrose has also become a local hub of activity in the oil industry. The town is surrounded by the Rural Municipality of Monet No. 257.

== History ==
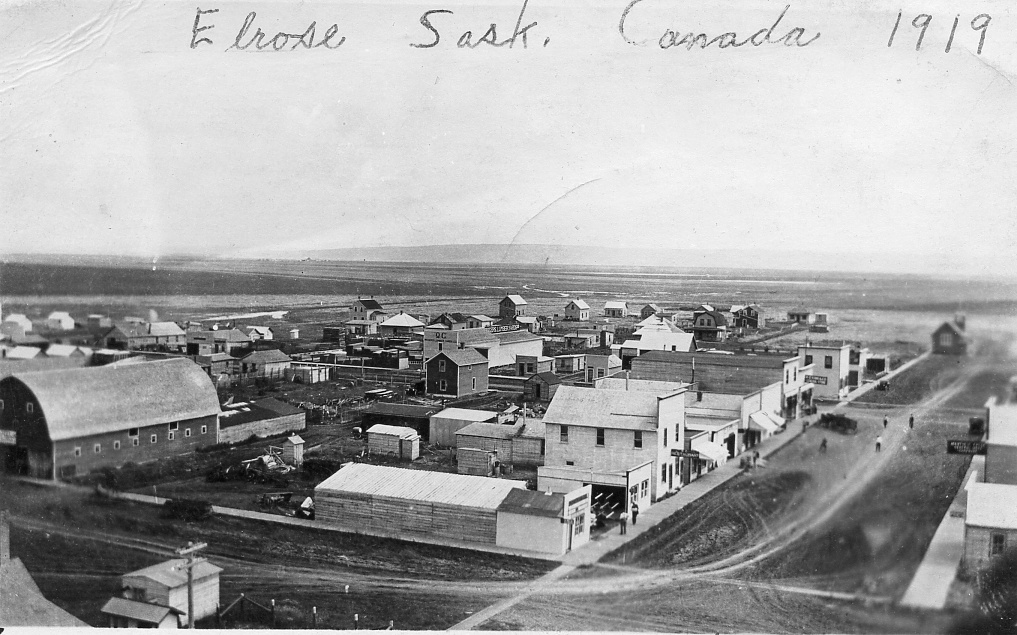
Elrose in 1919

Some homesteaders and other settlers were established in the area before the arrival of the railroads, being situated along the remains of the historic Swift Current–Battleford Trail, but the majority of newcomers arrived by rail later. The town of Elrose was originally called LaBerge after local landowner Albert LaBerge. After the railway arrived in 1913, the countryside quickly filled with people and a meeting was called to discuss a permanent name for the town. Elrose was chosen, although the origin of this name is unclear for certain.

Elrose incorporated as a village in 1914. Schools and grain elevators were built, the town grew as more people arrived, and prairie sod was turned under to sow crops. The newly tilled land was rich, agriculture was profitable, and communities thrived. In 1951 Elrose reached Town status. During the 1960s and 1970s, smaller villages in the area (Hughton, Wartime, Forgan, Greenan) began to decline and their populations migrated to Elrose.

== Government ==
Elrose is part of the Cypress Hills—Grasslands Federal Riding with David Anderson as the federal Member of Parliament representing this town in Ottawa. Elrose belongs to the provincial constituency Rosetown-Elrose, with the elected Member of the Legislative Assembly Jim Reiter who represents this town in Regina. The town of Elrose has its affairs looked after by Elrose Town Council, currently headed by Mayor Allen MacDonald.

== Education ==
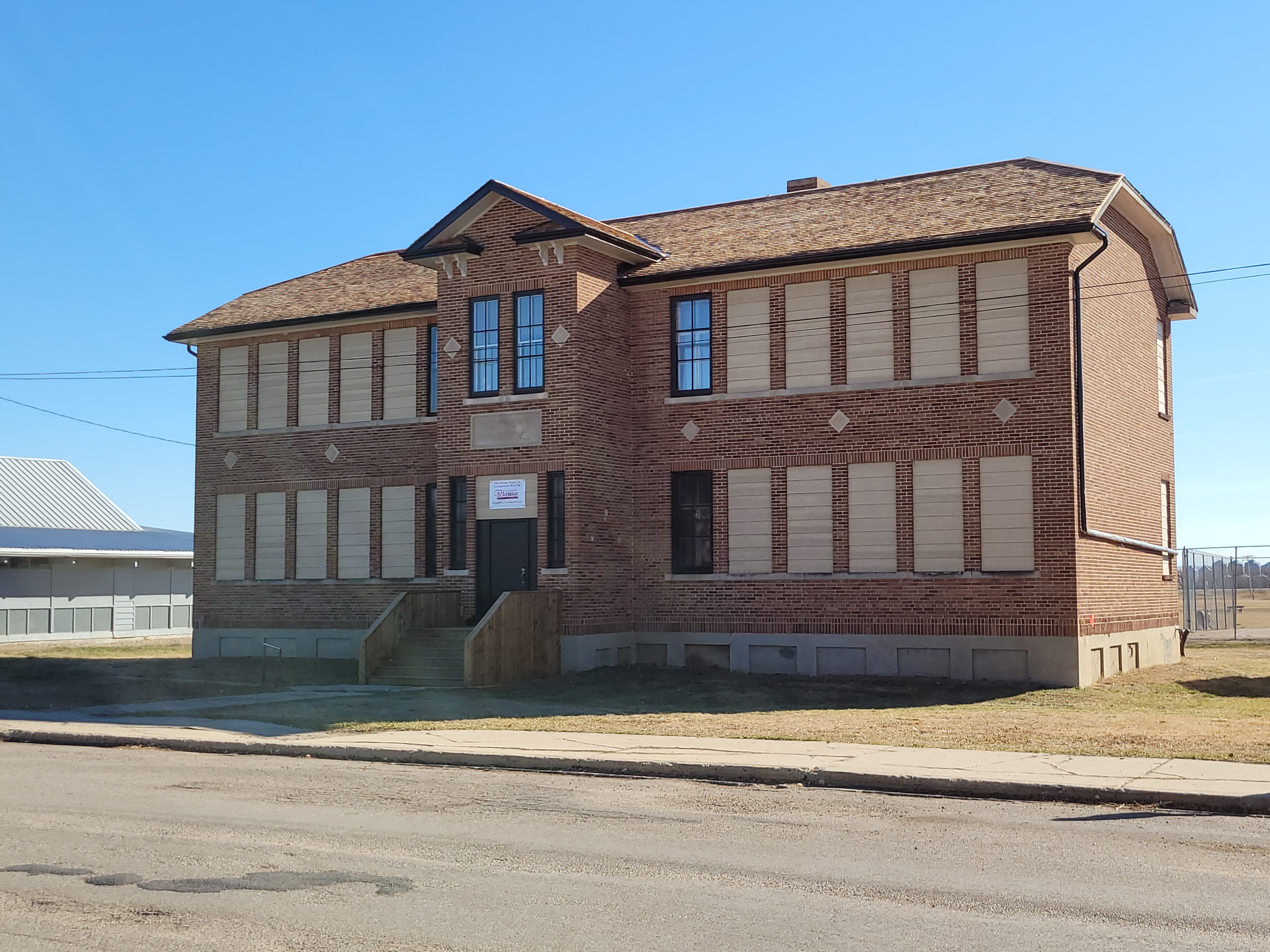
Elrose Brick School, which held classes from 1927 to 1981

Elrose Composite School provides both primary and secondary for Elrose and surrounding rural areas. Elrose Composite School is part of the Sun West School Division which provides education to the west-central part of Saskatchewan, one of the largest school divisions in the area. Early childhood education is provided at the community owned daycare, the Elrose ABC Family Centre.

== Demographics ==
In the 2021 Census of Population conducted by Statistics Canada, Elrose had a population of 470 living in 207 of its 248 total private dwellings, a change of −5.2% from its 2016 population of 496. With a land area of 2.89 km^{2} (1.12 sq mi), it had a population density of 162.6/km^{2} (421.2/sq mi) in 2021.

Canada census – Elrose community profile

	2021	2016	2011
Population	470 (-5.2% from 2016)	496 (+4.0% from 2011)	477 (+5.3% from 2006)
Land area	2.89 km^{2} (1.12 sq mi)	2.82 km^{2} (1.09 sq mi)	2.76 km^{2} (1.07 sq mi)
Population density	162.8/km^{2} (422/sq mi)		172.8/km^{2} (448/sq mi)
Median age	55.6 (M: 50.8, F: 57.2)
Private dwellings	248 (total) 207 (occupied)	247 (total)
Median household income	$84,000

References: 2021 2016 2011

== Climate ==
Climate data for Elrose
Month	Jan	Feb	Mar	Apr	May	Jun	Jul	Aug	Sep	Oct	Nov	Dec	Year
Record high °C (°F)	11 (52)	14 (57)	22 (72)	32 (90)	37 (99)	40 (104)	38 (100)	39 (102)	37.2 (99.0)	29 (84)	22.8 (73.0)	15.5 (59.9)	40 (104)
Mean daily maximum °C (°F)	−8.9 (16.0)	−4.9 (23.2)	2.5 (36.5)	12.4 (54.3)	19.4 (66.9)	23.8 (74.8)	26.3 (79.3)	26.1 (79.0)	19.8 (67.6)	12.6 (54.7)	0.7 (33.3)	−6.3 (20.7)	10.3 (50.5)
Daily mean °C (°F)	−13.9 (7.0)	−10 (14)	−2.8 (27.0)	5.6 (42.1)	12.3 (54.1)	16.9 (62.4)	19.2 (66.6)	18.7 (65.7)	12.8 (55.0)	6.2 (43.2)	−4.2 (24.4)	−11.2 (11.8)	4.1 (39.4)
Mean daily minimum °C (°F)	−18.9 (−2.0)	−15 (5)	−8.1 (17.4)	−1.3 (29.7)	5.1 (41.2)	9.9 (49.8)	12.1 (53.8)	11.2 (52.2)	5.8 (42.4)	−0.1 (31.8)	−9.1 (15.6)	−16.1 (3.0)	−2 (28)
Record low °C (°F)	−41 (−42)	−41 (−42)	−32.8 (−27.0)	−29.4 (−20.9)	−9.5 (14.9)	−2 (28)	2.5 (36.5)	0 (32)	−9 (16)	−26.5 (−15.7)	−34.5 (−30.1)	−42 (−44)	−42 (−44)
Average precipitation mm (inches)	18.6 (0.73)	12.3 (0.48)	22.9 (0.90)	24.9 (0.98)	54.5 (2.15)	63.6 (2.50)	63.9 (2.52)	42.6 (1.68)	29.9 (1.18)	16.9 (0.67)	18.5 (0.73)	21 (0.8)	389.4 (15.33)
Source: Environment Canada

== Parks and recreation ==
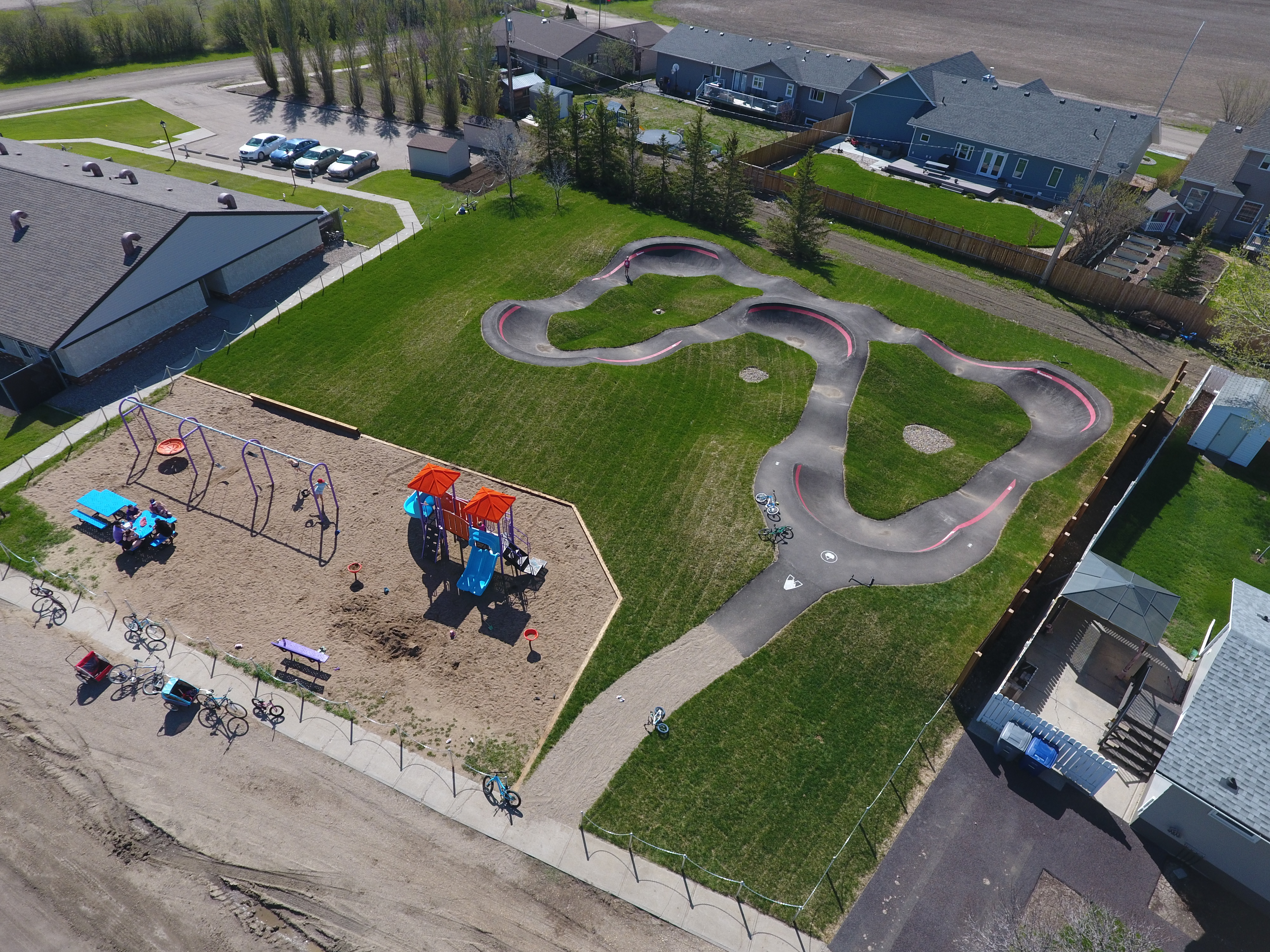
The Elrose Gasper Family Park on 4th Ave W

As with most rural Saskatchewan towns, Elrose offers a variety of opportunities for people to get out and enjoy themselves. There is the Elrose Memorial Hall, a 40' x 120' structure built in the 1950s and expanded in 2019, that serves as a venue for a variety of events including dances, plays, weddings and auctions.

The Elrose-Monet Uniplex is a multi-use facility located at the southern end of Elrose's Main Street. This facility was constructed following the loss by fire of the original Elrose Arena. The Elrose-Monet Uniplex houses a skating rink, curling rink, and an Olympic-sized indoor swimming pool. In 2021 the major project of installing a concrete floor in the skating arena was completed. The building serves as a base for the sports grounds behind it, which include baseball diamonds, a batting cage, and a number of full service campsites at Elrose Regional Park. The Uniplex continues to be an outstanding facility for the town and surrounding community.

The Gasper Family Park, located on 4th Avenue W, is home to a playground, greenspace, and a world class pump track for bicycles, scooters, rollerblades.

== Library ==
- Wheatland Regional Library

== Newspapers ==
- Eston-Elrose Press Review

== Transportation ==
Previous to the building of railroads, many travellers through the area followed the historic Swift Current–Battleford Trail. This winding cart trail connected Fort Battleford on the North Saskatchewan River with the Saskatchewan Landing, a natural crossing on the South Saskatchewan River. Both Highway 4 and Highway 44 serve vehicular traffic to and from Elrose.

== Notable people ==
- Bill McKnight — Canadian politician
- James Cobban — Canadian politician

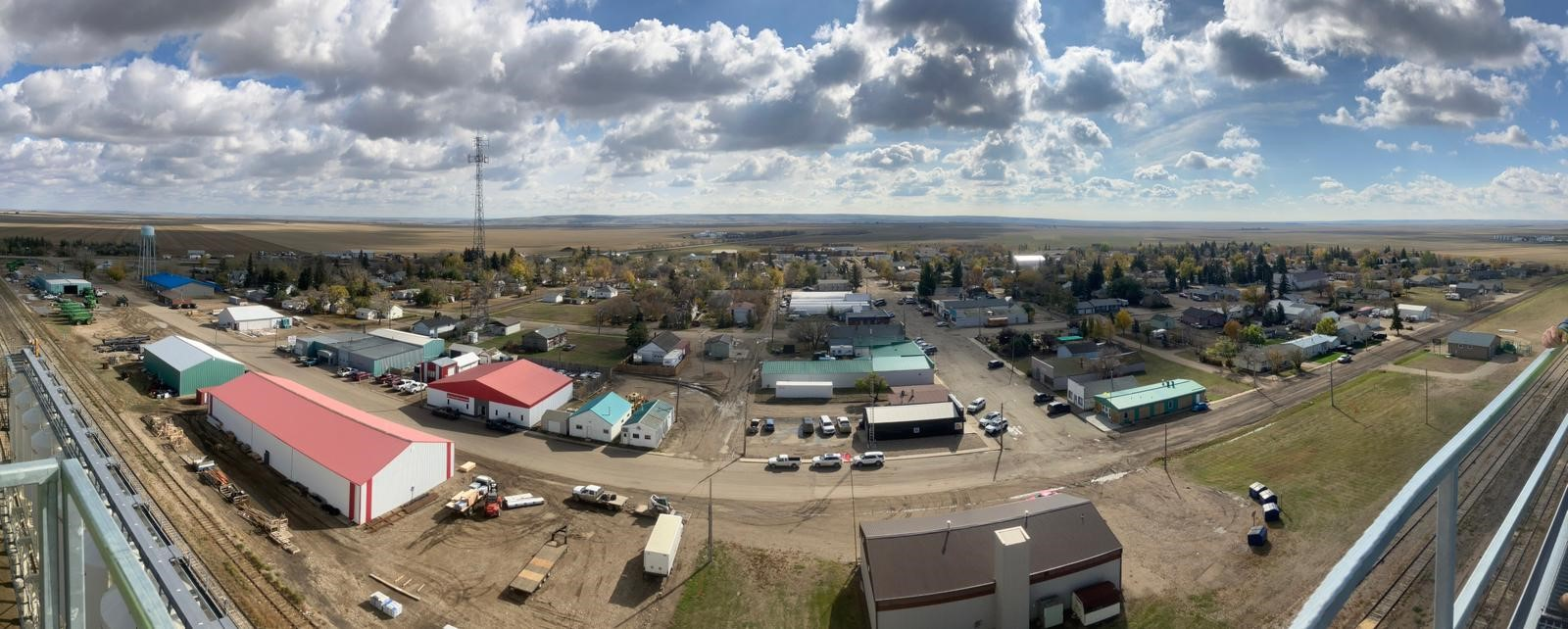

== See also ==
- List of communities in Saskatchewan
- List of towns in Saskatchewan
