= Saskatchewan Landing Provincial Park =

Provincial park in Saskatchewan, Canada

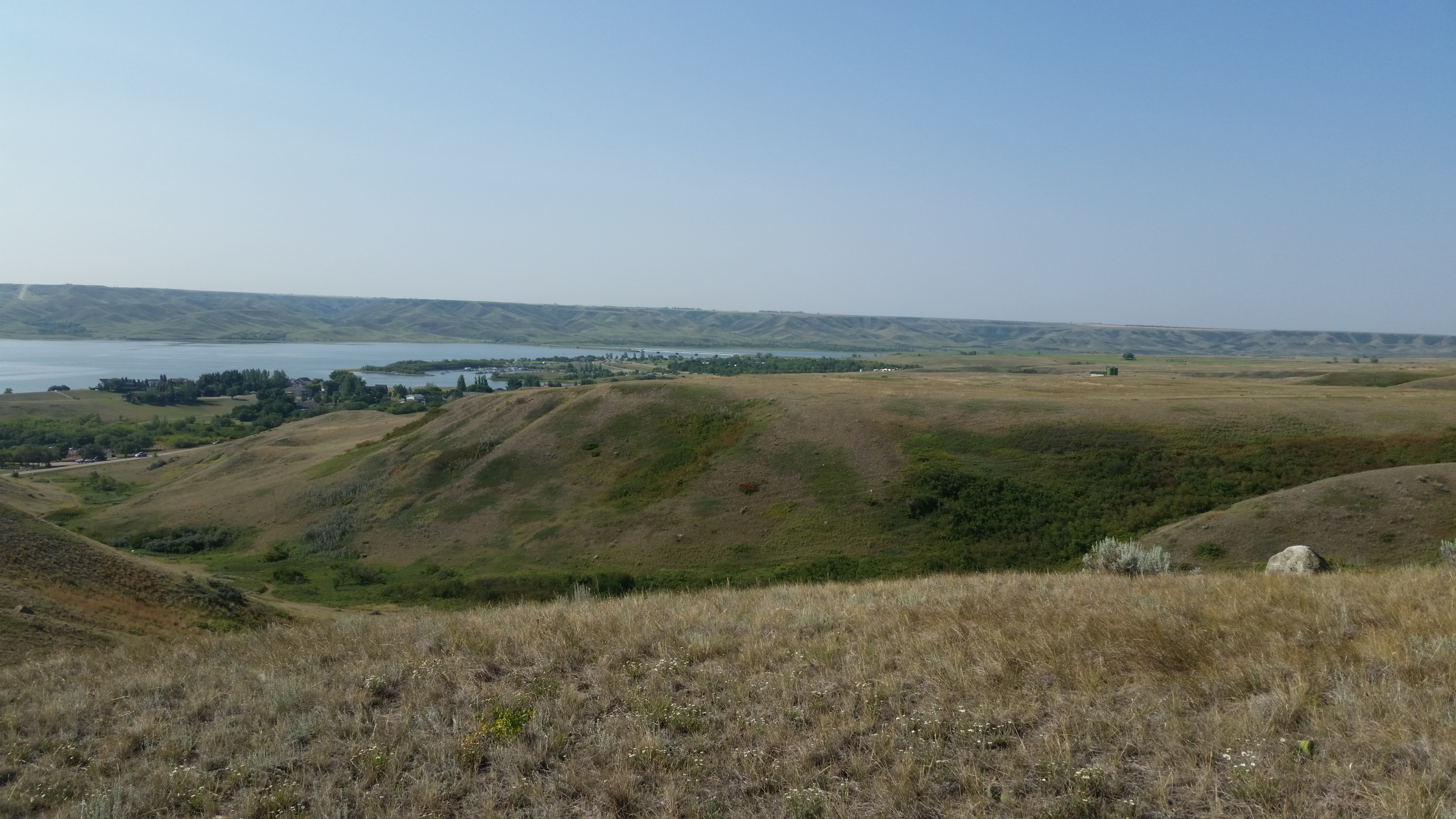
- A view of Saskatchewan Landing Provincial Park looking south

- Location within Saskatchewan Location within Canada
- Interactive map of Saskatchewan Landing Provincial Park
- Location: Saskatchewan, Canada
- Nearest town: Stewart Valley
- Coordinates: 50.65°N 107.99°W
- Area: 57.35 km^{2} (22.14 sq mi)
- Established: 1973
- Governing body: Sask Parks
- Website: Official website

Saskatchewan Landing Provincial Park (often shortened to Sask Landing) is a provincial park in the Canadian province of Saskatchewan. It is in the valley of the South Saskatchewan River at the western end of Lake Diefenbaker in the RM of Saskatchewan Landing No. 167, about 50 kilometres (31 mi) north of Swift Current. The park is 5,735 hectares (14,170 acres) in size.

Popular activities in the park include hiking, swimming, camping, and fishing. The park is home to the historic Goodwin House and notable crossing of the South Saskatchewan River. The Goodwin House serves as the visitor information centre for the park. It also includes an 18-hole golf resort.

== History ==
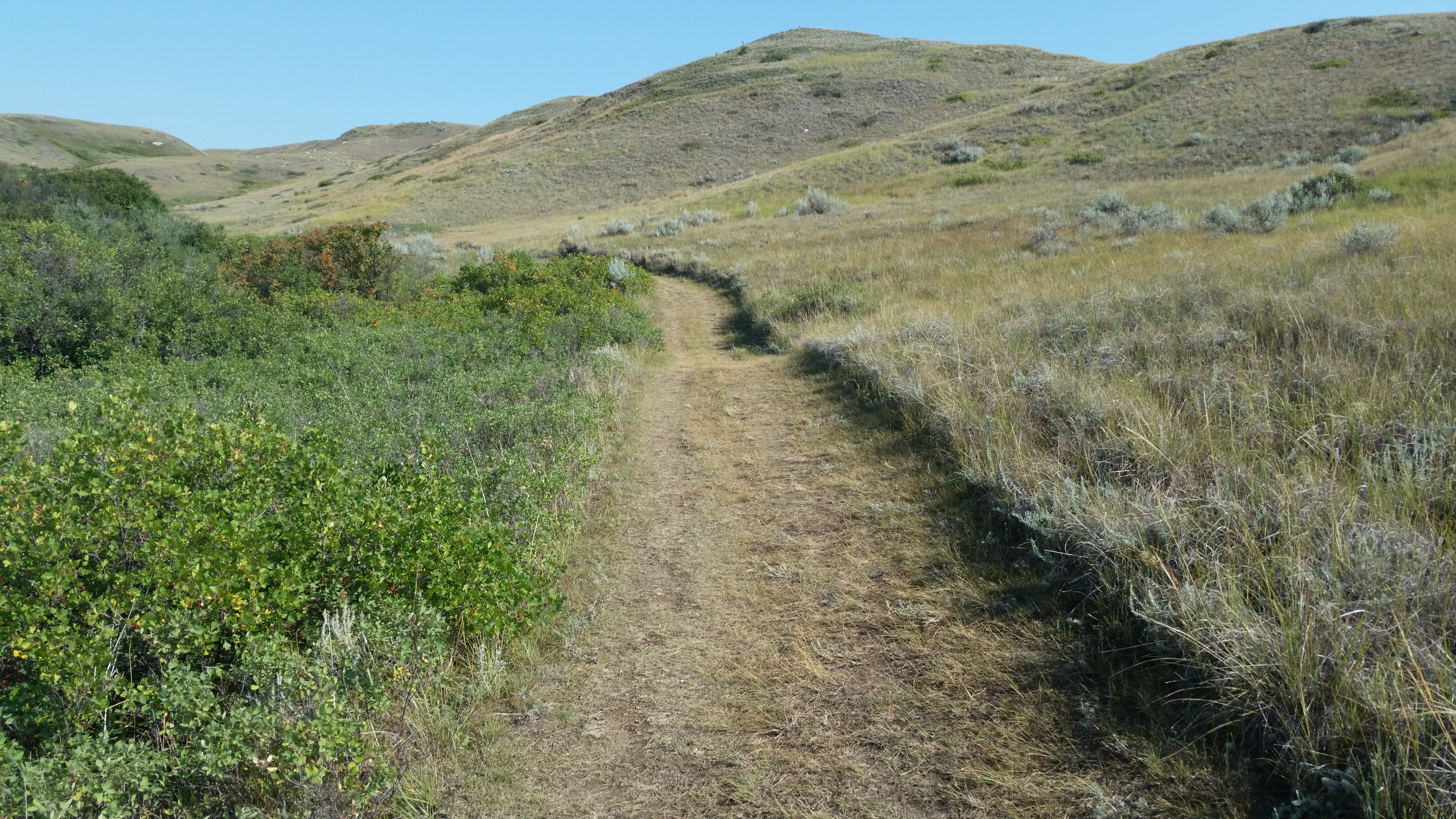
Ridges and Ravines trail

The location is believed to be a former Métis river crossing and part of the historic Swift Current–Battleford Trail. There are many pieces of evidence supporting the theory: ruts left from the Red River carts crossing the river, teepee rings, trails, and the Goodwin House (a large stone building built by Frank Goodwin in 1897). It is believed that in the early 1900s, Saskatchewan Landing became a stop-over point for travellers, supported by the Goodwin House.

== Amenities and activities ==
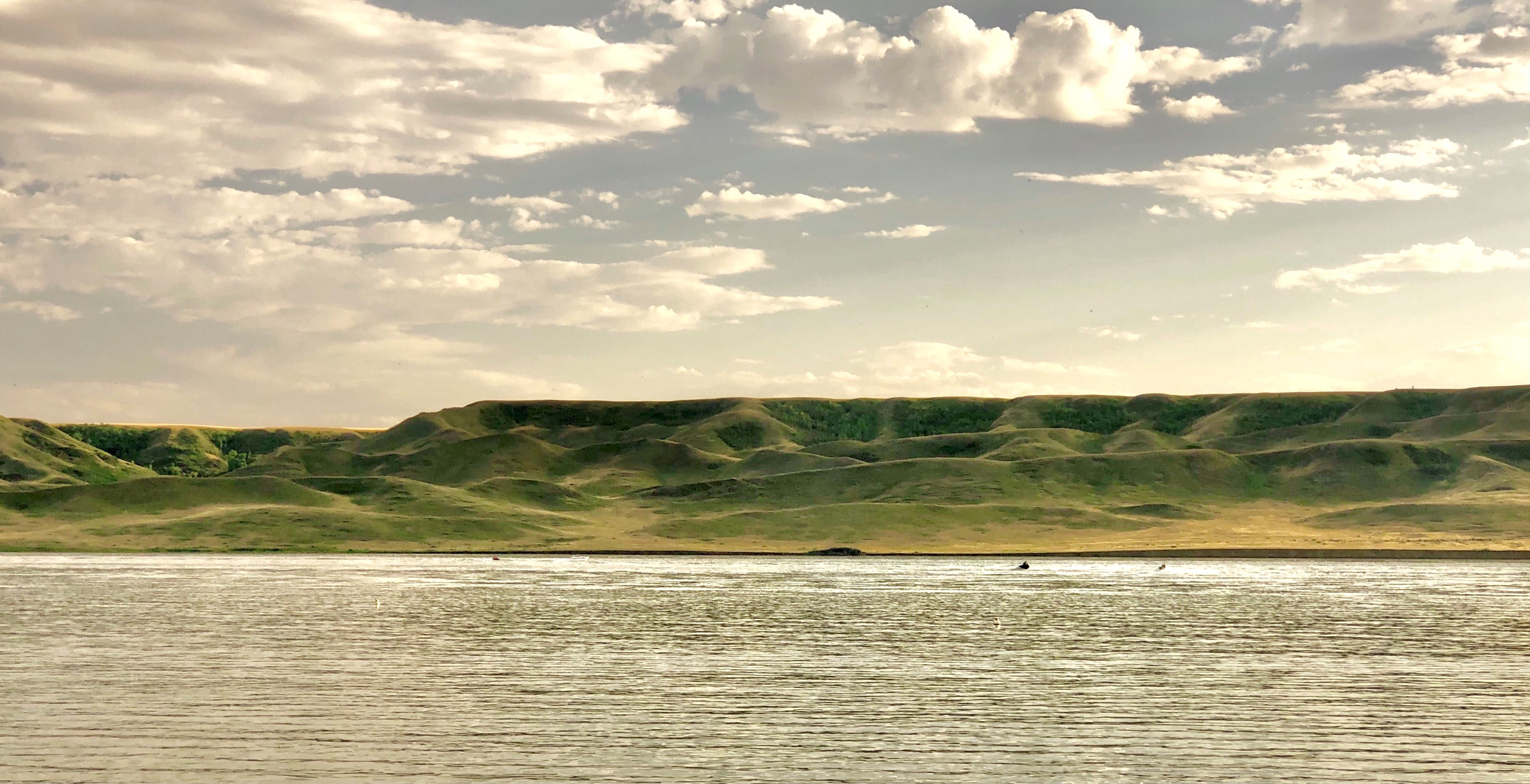
South facing photo from beach area at Saskatchewan Landing Provincial Park.

There are many activities in Saskatchewan Landing Provincial Park. At the north-west section of the park, there is an unsupervised swimming area and beach. East of the beach, there is a boat launch for fishing; fish commonly found in the lake include northern pike, rainbow trout, and walleye. There are also three main interpretive hiking trails: Prairie Vista, Ridges and Ravines, and Rings, Ruts & Remnants within the park. On the north side of the lake, there's an 18-hole golf course and an 18-hole mini-golf course at Sask Landing Marina.

On the northern shore of the lake, there are four campgrounds with about 300 campsites. Most are located along the South Saskatchewan River and Lake Diefenbaker.

- Nighthawk Campground is the smallest campground with 28 campsites. The sites are electrified.
- Riverside Campground has 40 electric sites. It is located across the road from Nighthawk and is along the lake's shore.
- Sagebrush Campground is the second largest campground with 54 campsites, all of which are electrified.
- Bearpaw Campground is the largest with 170 campsites. Bearpaw is on the lake's shore and all of the sites are electrified.

== See also ==
- List of protected areas of Saskatchewan
- Tourism in Saskatchewan
